= Natural time analysis =

Natural time analysis is a statistical method applied to analyze complex time series and critical phenomena, based on event counts as a measure of "time" rather than the clock time. Natural time concept was introduced by P. Varotsos, N. Sarlis and E. Skordas in 2001. Natural time analysis has been primarily applied to earthquake prediction / nowcasting and secondarily to sudden cardiac death / heart failure and financial markets. Natural time characteristics are considered to be unique.

== Etymology ==
"Natural time" is a new view of time introduced in 2001 that is not continuous, in contrast to conventional time which is in the continuum of real numbers, but instead its values form countable sets as natural numbers.

== Definition ==
In natural time domain each event is characterized by two terms, the "natural time" χ, and the energy Q_{k}. χ is defined as k/N, where k is a natural number (the k-th event) and N is the total number of events in the time sequence of data. A related term, p_{k}, is the ratio Q_{k} / Q_{total}, which describes the fractional energy released. The term κ_{1} is the variance in natural time:

$$\kappa_1=\sum_{k=1}^N p_k(\chi_k)^2 - \bigl(\sum_{k=1}^N p_k\chi_k\bigr)^2$$

where $\textstyle\chi_k=k/N$ and $\textstyle\ p_k=\frac{Q_k}{\sum_{n=1}^N Q_n}$

== Time reversal ==
Time reversal, in contrast to clock time, is applicable when studying the approach of a system to criticality with natural time analysis. Living systems for example are considered to operate far from equilibrium as there is flow of energy crossing their boundaries, in contrast to deceased organisms where inner driving forces are absent. While time irreversibility is a fundamental property of a living system, the state of death is more time reversible by means of energy flow across the system's boundaries. Thus a critical state of a system can be estimated by applying natural time analysis upon calculating the entropy upon both normal time flow and time reversal and studying the difference of the two results.

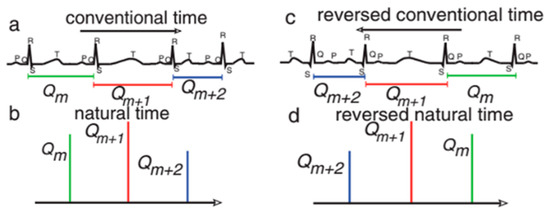
(a) ECG in which the RR distances are marked (b) the same ECG plotted in (a) but read in natural time analysis (c) ECG at conventional time upon time reversal (d) ECG upon time reversal in natural time analysis The length between RR distances in conventional time is approximately considered as the energy of each pulse (event) in natural time analysis.

== Applications ==
=== Seismology ===
==== Earthquake prediction ====
Natural time analysis has been initially applied to VAN method in order to improve the accuracy of the estimation of the time of a forthcoming earthquake that has been indicated to occur by seismic electric signals (SES). The method deems SES valid when κ_{1} = 0.070. Once the SES are deemed valid, a second NT analysis is started in which the subsequent seismic (rather than electric) events are noted, and the region is divided up as a Venn diagram with at least two seismic events per overlapping rectangle. When κ_{1} approaches the value κ_{1} = 0.070 for the candidate region, a critical seismic event is considered imminent, i.e. it will occur in a few days to one week or so.

==== Earthquake nowcasting ====
In seismology, nowcasting is the estimate of the current dynamic state of a seismological system. It differs from forecasting which aims to estimate the probability of a future event but it is also considered a potential base for forecasting. Nowcasting is based on the earthquake cycle model, a recurring cycle between pairs of large earthquakes in a geographical area, upon which the system is evaluated using natural time. Nowcasting calculations produce the "earthquake potential score", an estimation of the current level of seismic progress.

When applied to seismicity, natural time has the following advantages:

1. Declustering of the aftershocks is not necessary as natural time count is evenly valid in any case of aftershock or backgroung seismicity.
2. Natural time statistics do not depend on the level of seismicity, given that the b value does not significantly vary.

Typical applications are: great global earthquakes and tsunamis, aftershocks and induced seismicity, induced seismicity at gas fields, seismic risk to global megacities, studying of clustering of large global earthquakes, etc.

=== Cardiology ===
Natural time analysis has been experimentally used for the diagnosis of heart failure syndrome as well as identifying patients at high risk for sudden cardiac death, even when measuring solely the heart rate, either using electrocardiography or far more inexpensive and portable equipment (i.e. oximeter).

=== Economy ===
Due to similarities of the dynamic characteristics between earthquakes and financial markets, natural time analysis, which is primarily used in seismology, was chosen to assist in developing winning strategies in financial markets, with encouraging results.

== Bibliography ==
- Varotsos, Panayiotis A.; Sarlis, Nicholas V.; Skordas, Efthimios S. (2011). Natural time analysis: the new view of time; Precursory seismic electric signals, earthquakes and other complex time series. Berlin: Springer. ISBN 978-3-642-16449-1. OCLC 755081829.
