= Iben Browning =

American failed climatologist (1918–1991)

- Born: January 18, 1918; Edna, Texas
- Died: July 18, 1991 (aged 73); Albuquerque, New Mexico
- Occupation: business consultant
- Known for: erroneous earthquake prediction

Iben Browning (January 9, 1918 – July 18, 1991) was an American business consultant, author, and "self-proclaimed climatologist" who made failed predictions of various disasters involving climate, volcanoes, earthquakes, and government collapse.

== Life and career ==
Browning was born in Edna, Texas, grew up in Jackson County, Texas, and graduated from Southwest Texas State Teachers College in 1937, majoring in both math and physics. During World War II, he served in the U.S. Army Air Corps. Subsequently, he earned an M.A. at the University of Texas at Austin in 1947, and then his doctorate (Ph.D.) the following year at the same school. His doctorate was in zoology, with minors in genetics and bacteriology.

Browning worked in various scientific fields, including artificial intelligence and bio-engineering, and eventually became interested in long-term weather forecasting and climate changes. In 1957 he was employed at Sandia Corporation in Albuquerque, New Mexico where he proposed an innovative "delivery system for atomic weapons." He believed that climatic fluctuations are caused by changes in the amount of particulate matter in the atmosphere mostly from volcanic activity. He believed that volcanic activity can be triggered by land tidal forces caused by the Moon, Earth's elliptical orbit of the Sun, and the alignment of these three bodies. His climate predictions assumed that the dust thrown into the atmosphere by those eruptions reflects sunlight, which results in climatic cooling. Browning believed that climatic changes, especially cooling, are associated with increased troubles in human society, including famine, revolutions, and war.

After founding The Browning Newsletter in 1974, Browning described his climatic theories and findings in Climate and the Affairs of Men (1975), which he co-authored with Nels Winkless III. At that time, he believed that Earth had been through a long warm period and was moving into a dangerous cooling phase. He also declared that he had not detected any effect of human activity on the climate.

Browning received notoriety for his erroneous prediction that a major earthquake would occur on the New Madrid Fault around December 2 and 3, 1990. This prediction had no scientific legitimacy, and was largely ignored by credentialed seismologists, who thought it would give the prediction undeserved attention if they were to debunk it in public. In spite of this it was widely reported in the national media, which promoted fear, anxiety, and hysteria among residents of the Mississippi Valley. No earthquake occurred in that area on those dates. A study done by the USGS to understand the causes of the earthquake scare described Browning's methodology as pseudoscience.

Browning wrote four books, held 90 patents, and served as a climatologist and business consultant to Paine Webber in various scientific and engineering fields. He was married to the former Florence Pinto and had one daughter, Evelyn Browning-Garriss., who succeeded him as editor of 'The Browning Newsletter'. He lived his later years in Albuquerque, and died at his home there on July 18, 1991, from a heart attack at the age of 73.
