= Earthquake cycle =

Natural phenomenon

A diagram illustrating the interseismic, preseismic, and postseismic periods for a subduction zone earthquake cycle. The over-riding plate bends to accumulate stress during the interseismic period and rebounds back to its previous position to release stress.

The earthquake cycle refers to the phenomenon that earthquakes repeatedly occur on the same fault as the result of continual stress accumulation and periodic stress release. Earthquake cycles can occur on a variety of faults including subduction zones and continental faults. Depending on the size of the earthquake, an earthquake cycle can last decades, centuries, or longer. The Parkfield portion of the San Andreas fault is a well-known example where similarly located M6.0 earthquakes have been instrumentally recorded every 30–40 years.

== Theory ==
After Harry F. Reid proposed the elastic-rebound theory in 1910 based on the surface rupture record from the 1906 San Francisco earthquake, and accumulated geodetic data demonstrated continual stress loading from the plate motion, a theory of the "cyclic" earthquake re-occurrence began to form in the late twentieth century.

=== Stress accumulation and elastic rebound ===
Earthquake-cycle theory combines the stress-accumulation hypothesis and elastic-rebound theory. A complete earthquake cycle can be divided into interseismic, preseismic, coseismic and postseismic periods. During the interseismic period, stress accumulates on a locked fault due to plate motion. In the preseismic period, this stress is approaching the rupture limit, and some earthquake precursors may occur. When this stress finally exceeds the rupture limit, the fault will start to move and both sides rebound to their previous positions, releasing their accumulated stress via an earthquake. During the postseismic period, the relaxation of the other parts of the fault caused by redistributed stresses may cause afterslip. Because Earth's plate movement constantly stresses faults, this cycle will likely repeat.

A diagram of the spring-slider model. A block on a rough surface is connected to a spring that is pulled at a constant velocity u.

=== Spring-slider model ===
The simple spring-slider coupling model helps explain the recurrence of earthquake cycles. The premise is that a stationary block in contact with a rough surface is dragged by a spring that is pulled at a constant velocity. This process causes stress to continuously accumulate on the spring. Once the drag force exceeds the static friction limit f(0), the block will slide along the ground surface. Assuming that the kinematic friction is smaller than the static friction, the block's initial movement is unstable, which is equivalent to a fault rupture. Once the block comes to rest at a new location, stress begins to accumulate again. Coupled systems of spring-slider models have successfully reproduced the Gutenberg–Richter law.

=== Rupture variety ===
Although simple models of earthquake recurrence are fully predictable, many real-world factors can significantly alter cycle length, including uneven stress accumulation, time-varying crustal strengths, and fluid migration. Under different conditions, stress can be released via rapid ruptures, aseismic slow slips, or earthquake swarms. Understanding the irregularity of these different slip types is crucial to comprehending earthquakes cycles.

== Observations ==
So far, complete earthquake cycles have barely been recorded, and geodetic and geology data become key sources for the analysis of different stages in an earthquake cycle.

=== Geodetic measurement ===
Geodetic measurements are important tools to verify the interseismic stage stress accumulation and postseismic stage stress redistribution in earthquake cycles. For example, the GPS data collected in the past few decades has shown steady strain accumulations for the San Andreas fault system and continuous surface uplift of the Nankai subduction zone's overriding plate caused by the stress accumulation. Analysis of the slip rate on the southern San Andreas fault system with the interferometric radar (InSAR) technology also suggests that this fault may be approaching the end of its interseismic stage. A significant amount of aseismic slow slip and creep during the interseismic period has also been discovered on both subduction zones and continental faults through GPS and InSAR measurements.

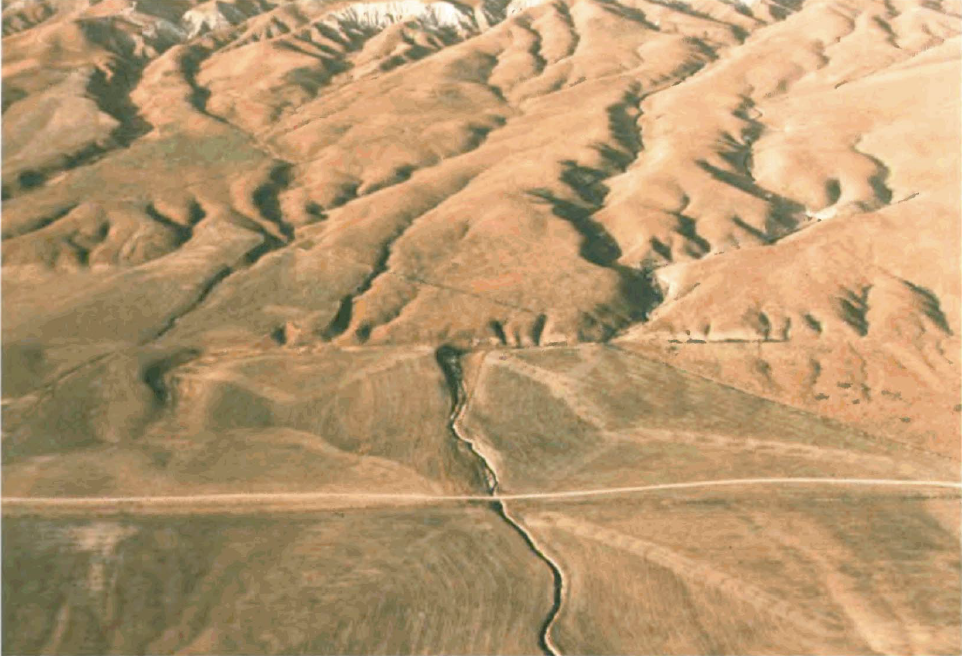
The Wallace Creek offset across the San Andreas Fault. The present channel offset represents a recent fault rupture. There are multiple abandoned channels on the left of the current channel representing multiple ancient fault ruptures.

=== Geologic evidence ===
Geological surveys are another method used to uncover ancient earthquake reoccurrences. The multiple offsets of the stream channels across the San Andreas fault at Wallace creek on Carrizo Plain is the classic evidence of fault rupture recurrence. Once an earthquake happened, the stream across the fault was cut off, leaving the offset channel abandoned, and a new channel forms. A set of abandoned channels has been discovered and is believed to be the remains of multiple ancient earthquake cycles. The sediment record is another key clue to finding ancient earthquakes. Examples are the coastal-uplift records of Muroto point near the Nankai subduction zone, caused by repeated megathrust earthquakes over many centuries; coastal uplift and tsunami records near the Hikurangi subduction margin, caused by 10 potential subduction earthquakes in the past 7000 years; and sediment accumulation recorded by 24 successive earthquakes on the strike-slip Alpine fault in the past 8000 years. Three repeated continental earthquakes in the Mongolia within the past 50,000 years have also been discovered from sediment-layer offset and growth records.

== Dynamic fault ==
More complicated than the spring-slider model, dynamic modeling of fault ruptures based on the constitutive framework (such as the rate-and-state friction law and elastic equations) is widely used in earthquake-cycle analysis. Dynamic fault modeling allows us to examine the role of different fault parameters in rupture-cycle behavior and reproduces many seismic observations.

=== Rate-and-state friction law ===
The rate-and-state friction law is widely applied in dynamic fault models and critically influences a fault's possible slip features. The rate-and-state friction law assumes that the friction coefficient is a function of both the sliding velocity (the rate) and the system conditions (the state). In the rate-and-state friction law, the friction coefficient increases when the slip velocity abruptly increases and then gradually decreases to reach a new steady value. The rate-and-state friction relation is influenced by a set of factors including thermal activation, the real area of contact (at the atomic scale), and molecular bonding effects.

=== Recent developments ===
Dynamic fault modeling helps explain the mechanisms driving earthquake cycles. Based on the rate-and-state friction law, the transfer from slow-slip events to rapid rupture earthquakes related to geometric and elastic parameters of the fault zone has been discovered. A computationally faster quasi-dynamic model that simplifies stress transfers allows new models taking plastic effects into consideration. However, comparison of quasi-dynamic models with fully dynamic models of the same systems shows that the modeling approach has significant impacts on the proposed earthquake-cycle slip features.

== Earthquake prediction applications ==
Although many scientists still view earthquake predictions as challenging or impossible, earthquake-cycle theories and modeling have long been consulted to produce hazard forecast values. For example, empirical models have been applied to forecast the likelihood of large earthquakes hitting the San Francisco Bay area in the near future. In addition, scientists have established a fully dynamic model for the Parkfield portion of the San Andreas Fault. This model successfully reproduces complete earthquake cycles that match the last half century's seismic records and shows promise for future earthquake predictions.
