= National Earthquake Prediction Evaluation Council =

The National Earthquake Prediction Evaluation Council (NEPEC) provides advice and recommendations to the director of the United States Geological Survey on earthquake predictions and related scientific research. It was created in 1980 by authority of the Earthquake Hazards Reduction Act of 1977.

The Council consists of eight to twelve members, appointed by the Director of the USGS; all "shall be experts in the scientific disciplines that bear on earthquake prediction or other relevant disciplines..." Up to half of the members may be Federal employees; the Chair (appointed by the Director) shall not be a USGS employee. (Current membership is listed at the National Earthquake Prediction Evaluation Council web page.)

The NEPEC is effectively the pre-assigned panel of experts that can be quickly summoned to evaluate claims of imminent geologic disaster and advise the responsible public authority; it avoids the scenario of a lone and previously unknown scientist trying to figure out on his own what to do to prevent a disaster.
