= Ruth Harris (scientist) =

Seismologist

Ruth Audrey Harris
- Education: University of California, Santa Barbara
- Scientific career
- Thesis: Structural controls of earthquake ruptures (1991)
- Doctoral advisor: Ralph Archueta

Ruth Harris is a scientist at the United States Geological Survey known for her research on large earthquakes, especially on how they begin, end, and cause the ground to shake. In 2019, Harris was elected a fellow of the American Geophysical Union who cited her "for outstanding contributions to earthquake rupture dynamics, stress transfer, and triggering".

== Education and career ==
Harris has a B.S. from Massachusetts Institute of Technology, and an M.S. from Cornell University (1984). After a few years of working, she came to the University of California, Santa Barbara where she earned a Ph.D. in 1991 working with Ralph Archueta. Following her Ph.D., she was a National Research Council postdoctoral investigator at the United States Geological Survey for two years before she was hired in a permanent position.

In 2015, Harris served as president of the Seismological Society of America.

== Research ==
Harris's research into earthquakes involves a combination of computer simulations and field and laboratory investigations. She is particularly interested in creeping faults, faults that creep for long periods of time while producing multiple small earthquakes. In California, Harris quantified stress within the Parkfield segment of the San Andreas Fault, estimated changes in stress during the 1992 Landers earthquake, and tracked the impact of the 1857 Fort Tejon earthquake on subsequent earthquakes in the region. She has simulated the movement of fractures across multiple segments of fault plans, and considered the role of earthquake depth and soil type in determining the strength of earthquakes such as the 2017 Puebla earthquake. Harris led the community effort to validate computer models of earthquakes with field-based verification efforts.

=== Selected publications ===
- Harris, Ruth A.; Segall, Paul (1987). "Detection of a locked zone at depth on the Parkfield, California, segment of the San Andreas Fault". Journal of Geophysical Research: Solid Earth. 92 (B8): 7945–7962. Bibcode:1987JGR....92.7945H. doi:10.1029/JB092iB08p07945. ISSN 2156-2202.
- Harris, Ruth A.; Simpson, Robert W. (November 1992). "Changes in static stress on southern California faults after the 1992 Landers earthquake". Nature. 360 (6401): 251–254. Bibcode:1992Natur.360..251H. doi:10.1038/360251a0. S2CID 4315800.
- Harris, Ruth A. (1998). "Introduction to Special Section: Stress Triggers, Stress Shadows, and Implications for Seismic Hazard". Journal of Geophysical Research: Solid Earth. 103 (B10): 24347–24358. Bibcode:1998JGR...10324347H. doi:10.1029/98JB01576. ISSN 2156-2202.
- Harris, Ruth A. (10 October 1998). "Introduction to Special Section: Stress Triggers, Stress Shadows, and Implications for Seismic Hazard". Journal of Geophysical Research: Solid Earth. 103 (B10): 24347–24358. Bibcode:1998JGR...10324347H. doi:10.1029/98JB01576.
- Harris, Ruth A. (2017). "Large earthquakes and creeping faults". Reviews of Geophysics. 55 (1): 169–198. Bibcode:2017RvGeo..55..169H. doi:10.1002/2016RG000539. ISSN 1944-9208.

== Awards and honors ==
- Meritorious Service Award, United States Department of the Interior (2011)
- Distinguished Alumna Award, University of California, Santa Barbara Department of Earth Science (2016)
- Fellow, American Geophysical Union (2019)
