= Panayiotis Varotsos =

Greek physicist (born 1947)

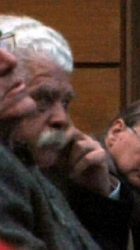
P. Varotsos attending a lecture at University Of Athens, Greece (2008)

Panayiotis Varotsos (Greek: Παναγιώτης Βαρώτσος; born November 28, 1947 in Patras) is a Greek physicist and former professor in the Department of Physics of the University of Athens, notable for his VAN method to predict earthquakes.

His group claims the ability to identify electromagnetic signals that are precursors to earthquakes. They suggest the precursors are generated by electricity from piezo-stimulated effects in rocks being stressed just prior to the earthquake rupture. Onassis Foundation Laureate for the Environment (1995). Also awarded by the Academy of Athens (1978) and Empeirikion Foundation (1986). In 2016 the Union of Greek Physicists honoured him for his work with a prize delivered by the President of Greece.

== Works ==
- P.A. Varotsos & K.D. Alexopoulos (1985). Thermodynamics of Point Defects and their relation with the bulk properties. Elsevier Science Ltd (North Holland). ISBN 0444869441.
- P. Varotsos (2005). The Physics of Seismic Electric Signals. Tokyo: TerraPub. ISBN 4887041365.
- P. Varotsos; N. Sarlis & E. Skordas (2011). Natural time analysis : the new view of time; Precursory seismic electric signals, earthquakes and other complex time series. Springer Praxis. ISBN 978-364216448-4.
