= Title 42 of the United States Code =

U.S. federal statutes on health, welfare, and civil rights

Title 42 of the United States Code is the United States Code dealing with public health, social welfare, and civil rights. Parts of Title 42 which formerly related to the US space program have been transferred to Title 51.

== Chapters ==
- 42 U.S.C. ch. 1—The Public Health Service
- 42 U.S.C. ch. 1A—The Public Health Service, Supplemental Provisions
- 42 U.S.C. ch. 2—Sanitation and Quarantine
- 42 U.S.C. ch. 3—Leprosy
- 42 U.S.C. ch. 3A—Cancer
- 42 U.S.C. ch. 4—Viruses, Serums, Toxins, Antitoxins, Etc.
- 42 U.S.C. ch. 5—Maternity and Infancy Welfare and Hygiene
- 42 U.S.C. ch. 6—The Children's Bureau
- 42 U.S.C. ch. 6A—Public Health Service (Public Health Service Act)
- 42 U.S.C. ch. 7—Social Security
- 42 U.S.C. ch. 7A—Temporary Unemployment Compensation Program
- 42 U.S.C. ch. 8—Low-Income Housing
- 42 U.S.C. ch. 8A—Slum Clearance, Urban Renewal, and Farm Housing
- 42 U.S.C. ch. 8B—Public Works or Facilities
- 42 U.S.C. ch. 8C—Open-Space Land
- 42 U.S.C. ch. 9—Housing of Persons Engaged in National Defense
- 42 U.S.C. ch. 10—Federal Security Agency
- 42 U.S.C. ch. 11—Compensation for Disability or Death to Persons Employed at Military, Air, and Naval Bases Outside United States
- 42 U.S.C. ch. 12—Compensation for Injury, Death, or Detention of Employees of Contractors with United States Outside United States
- 42 U.S.C. ch. 13—School Lunch Programs
- 42 U.S.C. ch. 13A—Child Nutrition
- 42 U.S.C. ch. 14—Development and Control of Atomic Energy
- 42 U.S.C. ch. 15—Disaster Relief
- 42 U.S.C. ch. 15A—Reciprocal Fire Protection Agreements
- 42 U.S.C. ch. 15B—Air Pollution Control
- 42 U.S.C. ch. 16—National Science Foundation
- 42 U.S.C. ch. 16A—Grants for Support of Scientific Research
- 42 U.S.C. ch. 16B—Contracts for Scientific and Technological Research
- 42 U.S.C. ch. 17—Federal Employment Service
- 42 U.S.C. ch. 18—Youth Medals
- 42 U.S.C. ch. 19—Saline and Salt Waters
- 42 U.S.C. ch. 19A—Water Resources Research Program
- 42 U.S.C. ch. 19B—Water Resources Planning
- 42 U.S.C. ch. 20—Elective Franchise
- 42 U.S.C. ch. 20A—Civil Rights Commission
- 42 U.S.C. ch. 21—Civil Rights
- 42 U.S.C. ch. 21A—Privacy Protection
- 42 U.S.C. ch. 21B—Religious Freedom Restoration
- 42 U.S.C. ch. 21C—Protection of Religious Exercise in Land Use and by Institutionalized Persons
- 42 U.S.C. ch. 22—Indian Hospitals and Health Facilities
- 42 U.S.C. ch. 23—Development and Control of Atomic Energy
- 42 U.S.C. ch. 24—Disposal of Atomic Energy Communities
- 42 U.S.C. ch. 25—Federal Flood Insurance
- 42 U.S.C. ch. 26—National Space Program
- 42 U.S.C. ch. 26A—National Space Grant College and Fellowship Program
- 42 U.S.C. ch. 26B—Biomedical Research in Space
- 42 U.S.C. ch. 27—Loan Service of Captioned Films and Educational Media for Handicapped
- 42 U.S.C. ch. 28—Area Redevelopment Program
- 42 U.S.C. ch. 29—Juvenile Delinquency and Youth Offenses Control
- 42 U.S.C. ch. 30—Manpower Development and Training Program
- 42 U.S.C. ch. 31—Public Works Acceleration Program
- 42 U.S.C. ch. 32—Third Party Liability for Hospital and Medical Care
- 42 U.S.C. ch. 33—Community Mental Health Centers
- 42 U.S.C. ch. 34—Economic Opportunity Program
- 42 U.S.C. ch. 35—Programs for Older Americans
- 42 U.S.C. ch. 35A—Community Service Employment for Older Americans
- 42 U.S.C. ch. 36—Compensation of Condemnees in Development Programs
- 42 U.S.C. ch. 37—Community Facilities and Advance Land Acquisition
- 42 U.S.C. ch. 38—Public Works and Economic Development
- 42 U.S.C. ch. 39—Solid Waste Disposal
- 42 U.S.C. ch. 40—Soil Information Assistance for Community Planning and Resource Development
- 42 U.S.C. ch. 41—Demonstration Cities and Metropolitan Development Program
- 42 U.S.C. ch. 42—Narcotic Addict Rehabilitation
- 42 U.S.C. ch. 43—Department of Health and Human Services
- 42 U.S.C. ch. 44—Department of Housing and Urban Development
- 42 U.S.C. ch. 45—Fair Housing
- 42 U.S.C. ch. 46—Justice System Improvement
- 42 U.S.C. ch. 47—Juvenile Delinquency Prevention and Control
- 42 U.S.C. ch. 48—Guarantees for Financing New Community Land Development
- 42 U.S.C. ch. 49—National Housing Partnerships
- 42 U.S.C. ch. 50—National Flood Insurance
- 42 U.S.C. ch. 51—Design and Construction of Public Buildings to Accommodate Physically Handicapped
- 42 U.S.C. ch. 52—Intergovernmental Cooperation
- 42 U.S.C. ch. 52A—Joint Funding Simplification
- 42 U.S.C. ch. 53—Advisory Commission on Intergovernmental Relations
- 42 U.S.C. ch. 54—Cabinet Committee on Opportunities for Spanish-Speaking People
- 42 U.S.C. ch. 55—National Environmental Policy
- 42 U.S.C. ch. 56—Environmental Quality Improvement
- 42 U.S.C. ch. 57—Environmental Pollution Study
- 42 U.S.C. ch. 58—Disaster Relief
- 42 U.S.C. ch. 59—National Urban Policy and New Community Development
- 42 U.S.C. ch. 60—Comprehensive Alcohol Abuse and Alcoholism Prevention, Treatment, and Rehabilitation Program
- 42 U.S.C. ch. 61—Uniform Relocation Assistance and Real Property Acquisition Policies for Federal and Federally Assisted Programs
- 42 U.S.C. ch. 62—Intergovernmental Personnel Program
- 42 U.S.C. ch. 63—Lead-Based Paint Poisoning Prevention
- 42 U.S.C. ch. 63A—Residential Lead-Based Paint Hazard Reduction
- 42 U.S.C. ch. 64—Public Service Employment Programs
- 42 U.S.C. ch. 65—Noise Control
- 42 U.S.C. ch. 66—Domestic Volunteer Services
- 42 U.S.C. ch. 67—Child Abuse Prevention and Treatment and Adoption Reform
- 42 U.S.C. ch. 68—Disaster Relief
- 42 U.S.C. ch. 69—Community Development
- 42 U.S.C. ch. 70—Manufactured Home Construction and Safety Standards
- 42 U.S.C. ch. 71—Solar Energy
- 42 U.S.C. ch. 72—Juvenile Justice and Delinquency Prevention
- 42 U.S.C. ch. 73—Development of Energy Sources
- 42 U.S.C. ch. 74—Nonnuclear Energy Research and Development
- 42 U.S.C. ch. 75—Programs for Individuals with Developmental Disabilities
- 42 U.S.C. ch. 76—Age Discrimination in Federally Assisted Programs
- 42 U.S.C. ch. 77—Energy Conservation
- 42 U.S.C. ch. 78—National Petroleum Reserve in Alaska
- 42 U.S.C. ch. 79—Science and Technology Policy, Organization and Priorities
- 42 U.S.C. ch. 80—Public Works Employment
- 42 U.S.C. ch. 81—Energy Conservation and Resource Renewal
- 42 U.S.C. ch. 82—Solid Waste Disposal
- 42 U.S.C. ch. 83—Energy Extension Service
- 42 U.S.C. ch. 84—Department of Energy
- 42 U.S.C. ch. 85—Air Pollution Prevention and Control
- 42 U.S.C. ch. 86—Earthquake Hazards Reduction
- 42 U.S.C. ch. 87—Water Research and Development
- 42 U.S.C. ch. 88—Uranium Mill Tailings Radiation Control Act
- 42 U.S.C. ch. 89—Congregate Housing Services
- 42 U.S.C. ch. 90—Neighborhood and City Reinvestment, Self-Help and Revitalization
- 42 U.S.C. ch. 91—National Energy Conservation Policy
- 42 U.S.C. ch. 92—Powerplant and Industrial Fuel Use
- 42 U.S.C. ch. 93—Emergency Energy Conservation
- 42 U.S.C. ch. 94—Low-Income Energy Assistance
- 42 U.S.C. ch. 95—United States Synthetic Fuels Corporation
- 42 U.S.C. ch. 96—Biomass Energy and Alcohol Fuels
- 42 U.S.C. ch. 97—Acid Precipitation Program and Carbon Dioxide Study
- 42 U.S.C. ch. 98—Ocean Thermal Energy Conversion Research and Development
- 42 U.S.C. ch. 99—Ocean Thermal Energy Conversion
- 42 U.S.C. ch. 100—Wind Energy Systems
- 42 U.S.C. ch. 101: Magnetic Fusion Energy Engineering
- 42 U.S.C. ch. 102: Mental Health Systems
- 42 U.S.C. ch. 103: Comprehensive Environmental Response, Compensation, and Liability
- 42 U.S.C. ch. 104: Nuclear Safety Research, Development, and Demonstration
- 42 U.S.C. ch. 105: Community Services Programs
- 42 U.S.C. ch. 106: Community Services Block Grant Program
- 42 U.S.C. ch. 107: Consumer-Patient Radiation Health and Safety
- 42 U.S.C. ch. 108: Nuclear Waste Policy
- 42 U.S.C. ch. 109: Water Resources Research
- 42 U.S.C. ch. 109A: Membrane Processes Research
- 42 U.S.C. ch. 110: Family Violence Prevention and Services
- 42 U.S.C. ch. 111: Emergency Federal Law Enforcement Assistance
- 42 U.S.C. ch. 112: Victim Compensation and Assistance
- 42 U.S.C. ch. 113: State Justice Institute
- 42 U.S.C. ch. 114: Protection And Advocacy For Mentally Ill Individuals
- 42 U.S.C. ch. 115: Child Development Associate Scholarship Assistance Program
- 42 U.S.C. ch. 116: Emergency Planning and Community Right-To-Know
- 42 U.S.C. ch. 117: Encouraging Good Faith Professional Review Activities
- 42 U.S.C. ch. 118: Alzheimer's Disease and Related Dementias Research
- 42 U.S.C. ch. 119: Homeless Assistance
- 42 U.S.C. ch. 120: Enterprise Zone Development
- 42 U.S.C. ch. 121: International Child Abduction Remedies
- 42 U.S.C. ch. 122: Native Hawaiian Health Care
- 42 U.S.C. ch. 123: Drug Abuse Education and Prevention
- 42 U.S.C. ch. 124: Public Housing Drug Elimination
- 42 U.S.C. ch. 125: Renewable Energy and Energy Efficiency Technology Competitiveness
- 42 U.S.C. ch. 126: Equal Opportunity For Individuals With Disabilities
- 42 U.S.C. ch. 127: Coordinated Services For Children, Youth, and Families
- 42 U.S.C. ch. 128: Hydrogen Research, Development, and Demonstration Program Act of 1990
- 42 U.S.C. ch. 129: National and Community Service
- 42 U.S.C. ch. 130: National Affordable Housing
- 42 U.S.C. ch. 131: Housing Opportunities for Persons with AIDS
- 42 U.S.C. ch. 132: Victims of Child Abuse
- 42 U.S.C. ch. 133: Pollution Prevention
- 42 U.S.C. ch. 134: Energy Policy
- 42 U.S.C. ch. 135: Residency and Service Requirements in Federally Assisted Housing
- 42 U.S.C. ch. 136: Violent Crime Control and Law Enforcement
- 42 U.S.C. ch. 137: Management of Rechargeable Batteries and Batteries Containing Mercury
- 42 U.S.C. ch. 138: Assisted Suicide Funding Restriction
- 42 U.S.C. ch. 139: Volunteer Protection
- 42 U.S.C. ch. 140: Criminal Justice Identification, Information, and Communication
- 42 U.S.C. ch. 140A: Jennifer's Law
- 42 U.S.C. ch. 141: Commercial Space Opportunities and Transportation Services
- 42 U.S.C. ch. 142: Poison Control Center Enhancement and Awareness
- 42 U.S.C. ch. 143: Intercountry Adoptions
- 42 U.S.C. ch. 144: Developmental Disabilities Assistance and Bill of Rights
- 42 U.S.C. ch. 145: Public Safety Officer Medal of Valor and Tributes
- 42 U.S.C. ch. 146: Election Administration Improvement
- 42 U.S.C. ch. 147: Prison Rape Elimination
- 42 U.S.C. ch. 148: Windstorm Impact Reduction
- 42 U.S.C. ch. 149: Energy Policy, 2005
- 42 U.S.C. ch. 150: National Aeronautics and Space Programs, 2005
- 42 U.S.C. ch. 151: Child Protection and Safety
- 42 U.S.C. ch. 152: Energy Independence and Security
