= Earthquake Hazards Reduction Act of 1977 =

- Long title: An Act to reduce the hazards of earthquakes, and for other purposes.
- Acronyms (colloquial): EHRA
- Enacted by: the 95th United States Congress
- Effective: October 7, 1977

Citations
- Public law: P.L. 95-124
- Statutes at Large: 91 Stat. 1098

Codification
- Titles amended: 42 U.S.C.: Public Health and Social Welfare
- U.S.C. sections created: 42 U.S.C. ch. 86 § 7701 et seq.

Legislative history
- Introduced in the Senate as S. 126 by Alan Cranston (D–CA) on January 10, 1977; Committee consideration by Senate Commerce, Science, and Transportation, House Science and Technology, House Interior and Insular Affairs; Passed the Senate on May 12, 1977 (Passed); Passed the House on September 9, 1977 (229-125, in lieu of H.R. 6683) with amendment; Senate agreed to House amendment on September 23, 1977 (Agreed); Signed into law by President Jimmy Carter on October 7, 1977

Earthquake Hazards Reduction Act of 1977 is a statute formulating a national policy to diminish the perils of earthquakes in the United States. The Act of Congress is a declaration for an earthquake prediction system, national earthquake hazards reduction program, and seismological research studies. The United States public law authorizes States assistance through the provisions of the Disaster Relief Act of 1974.

The Senate legislation was passed by the 95th U.S. Congressional session and enacted into law by the President Jimmy Carter on October 7, 1977.

== Sections of the Act ==
The Act was drafted as six sections defining the codified law within Title 42 Public Health and Social Welfare.

42 U.S.C. § 7701 ~	Short Title
42 U.S.C. § 7701 ~	Findings; Vulnerability of earthquake hazards to U.S. states Development and implementation of earthquake hazards reduction measures: Improvement in structural construction and design methods or practices; Redevelopment of land use controls; Prediction techniques and early warning systems; Coordinated earthquake preparedness plans; Public education and involvement programs; Coordinated program by Federal, State, local, and private entities Seismological research program Earthquake prediction system Earthquake control and seismological research findings Benefit of earthquake hazards reduction program Reduction of destruction, disruption, and loss based on individuals and organizations Severe earthquakes worldwide problem Review of Federal earthquake hazards reduction program by external sources
42 U.S.C. § 7702 ~	Purpose
42 U.S.C. § 7703 ~	Definitions
42 U.S.C. § 7704 ~	National Earthquake Hazards Reduction Program; Establishment of program Duties of Federal agency, department, or entity Objectives of program Participation by Federal agency, department, or entity: Department of Defense; Department of Housing and Urban Development; Energy Research and Development Administration; National Aeronautics and Space Administration; National Bureau of Standards; National Fire Prevention and Control Administration; National Oceanic and Atmospheric Administration; National Science Foundation; Nuclear Regulatory Commission; United States Geological Survey; Research elements Implementation plan State assistance Participation by local governments and State governments
42 U.S.C. § 7705 ~	Annual Report
42 U.S.C. § 7706 ~	Authorization of Appropriations; General; Geological Survey; National Science Foundation

== Amendments to 1977 Act ==
U.S. Congressional amendments to the Earthquake Hazards Reduction Act.

Date of Enactment	Public Law Number	U.S. Statute Citation	U.S. Legislative Bill	U.S. Presidential Administration
October 19, 1980	P.L. 96-472	94 Stat. 2257	S. 1393	Jimmy E. Carter
November 20, 1981	P.L. 97-80	95 Stat. 1081	S. 999	Ronald W. Reagan
January 12, 1983	P.L. 97-464	96 Stat. 2533	S. 2273	Ronald W. Reagan
March 22, 1984	P.L. 98-241	98 Stat. 95	S. 820	Ronald W. Reagan
September 30, 1985	P.L. 99-105	99 Stat. 475	S. 817	Ronald W. Reagan
February 29, 1988	P.L. 100-252	102 Stat. 18	S. 1612	Ronald W. Reagan
November 16, 1990	P.L. 101-614	104 Stat. 3231	S. 2789	George H.W. Bush
October 19, 1994	P.L. 103-374	108 Stat. 3492	H.R. 3485	William J. Clinton
October 1, 1997	P.L. 105-47	111 Stat. 1159	S. 910	William J. Clinton
November 13, 2000	P.L. 106-503	114 Stat. 2298	H.R. 1550	William J. Clinton
October 25, 2004	P.L. 108-360	118 Stat. 1668	H.R. 2608	George W. Bush

== See also ==
- Advisory Committee on Earthquake Hazards Reduction
- National Earthquake Hazards Reduction Program
- Earthquake engineering
- Earthquake forecasting
- Earthquake prediction
- Earthquake warning system
- Fault Zone
- National Earthquake Prediction Evaluation Council
- Office of Science and Technology Policy
- Seismo-electromagnetics
- Seismological Society of America
- Seismology
