= WRRA =

WRRA may refer to:

- WRRA-FM, a radio station (97.5 FM) licensed to Bridgman, Michigan, United States
- WRRA (AM), a radio station (1290 AM) formerly licensed to Frederiksted, U.S. Virgin Islands, which operated from 1977 to 2011
- Western Reserve Rowing Association
- Women's Road Records Association
- Water Resources Research Act
