= 1906 San Francisco earthquake =

Earthquake in California

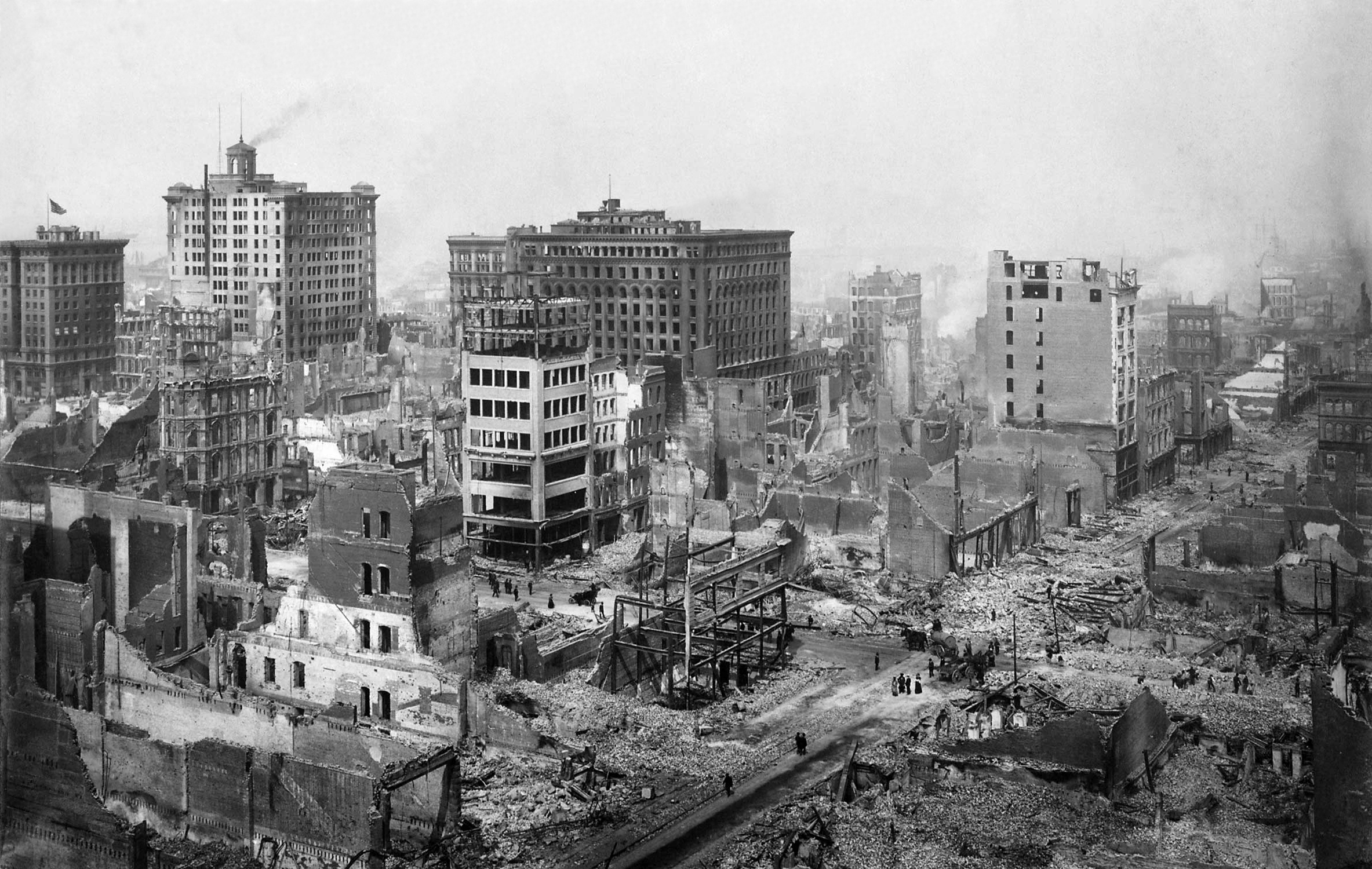
- Ruins in the vicinity of Post and Grant Avenue

- UTC time: 1906-04-18 13:12:27
- ISC event: 16957905
- USGS-ANSS: ComCat
- Local date: April 18, 1906; 120 years ago
- Local time: 05:12:27 (PST)
- Magnitude: 7.9 M_{w}
- Depth: 5 mi (8.0 km)
- Epicenter: 37.75°N 122.55°W
- Fault: San Andreas Fault
- Type: Strike-slip
- Areas affected: North Coast; San Francisco Bay Area; Central Coast; United States
- Max. intensity: MMI XI (Extreme)
- Tsunami: Yes
- Casualties: 700–3,000+

A magnitude 7.9 earthquake struck the coast of Northern California at 05:12 am Pacific Standard Time on Wednesday, April 18, 1906. With a maximum Mercalli intensity of XI (Extreme), it created high-intensity shaking from Eureka on the North Coast to the Salinas Valley, an agricultural region to the south of the San Francisco Bay Area.

Extensive fires soon broke out in San Francisco and lasted for several days. More than 3,000 people died and over 80% of the city was destroyed. The event is remembered as the deadliest earthquake in the history of the United States. The death toll remains the greatest loss of life from a natural disaster in California's history and high on the list of worst American disasters, natural or man-made. In 2005, footage of the event was selected for preservation in the United States National Film Registry by the Library of Congress as being "culturally, historically or aesthetically significant".

== Tectonic setting ==
The San Andreas Fault is a continental transform fault that forms part of the tectonic boundary between the Pacific plate and the North American plate. The strike-slip fault is characterized by mainly lateral motion in a dextral sense, where the western (Pacific) plate moves northward relative to the eastern (North American) plate. This fault runs the length of California from the Salton Sea in the south to Cape Mendocino in the north, a distance of about 810 miles (1,300 km). The maximum observed surface displacement was about 20 feet (6 m); geodetic measurements show displacements of up to 28 feet (8.5 m).

== Earthquake ==
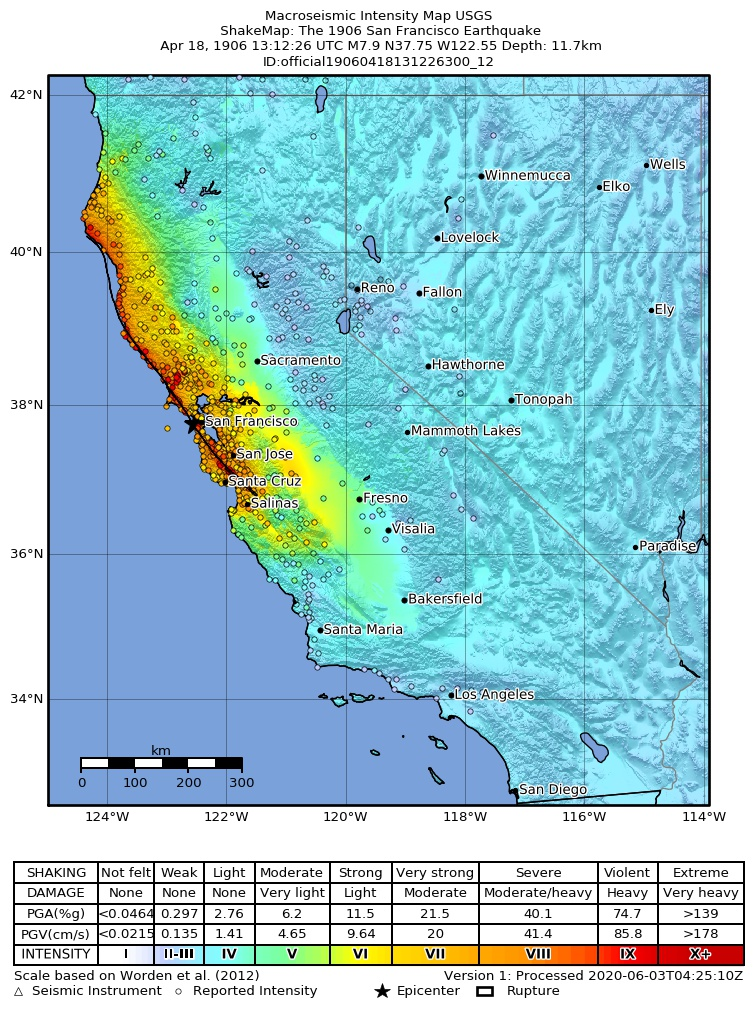
A USGS ShakeMap showing the earthquake's intensity

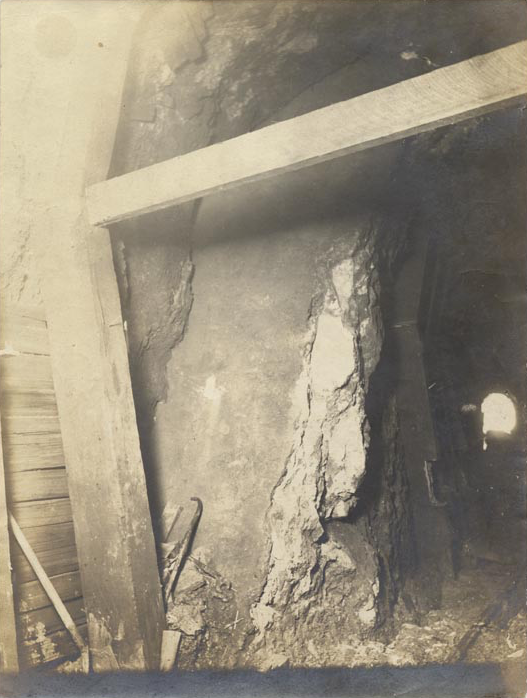
The slip on the San Andreas Fault that caused the earthquake was visible in Wrights Tunnel along the South Pacific Coast Railroad after the earthquake, with the north tunnel portal in the background and Wrights, California, just outside of the portal

A strong foreshock preceded the main shock by about 20 to 25 seconds, and the strong shaking of the main shock lasted about 42 seconds. The 1906 earthquake preceded the development of the Richter scale, but the most widely accepted estimate on the modern moment magnitude scale is 7.9, with proposed values from 7.7 to 8.3. Severe deformations in the Earth's crust took place both before and after the earthquake's impact. Accumulated strain on the faults in the system was relieved during the earthquake, which caused damage along a 280-mile-long (450 km) segment of the San Andreas plate boundary. The 1906 rupture propagated both northward and southward for a total of 296 miles (476 km), with shaking felt from Oregon to Los Angeles, and as far inland as central Nevada.

Before the 1906 quake there were decades of minor earthquakes – more than at any other time in the historical record for northern California. Previously interpreted as precursory activity to the 1906 earthquake, they have been found to have a strong seasonal pattern and are now believed to be caused by large seasonal sediment loads in coastal bays that overlie faults, erosion sediments left over from hydraulic mining in the later years of the California gold rush.

For years, the epicenter of the quake was assumed to be near the town of Olema, in the Point Reyes area of Marin County, due to local earth displacement measurements. In the 1960s, a seismologist at UC Berkeley proposed that the epicenter was more likely offshore of San Francisco, to the northwest of the Golden Gate. The most recent analyses support an offshore location for the epicenter, although significant uncertainty remains. An offshore epicenter is supported by the occurrence of a local tsunami recorded by a tide gauge at the San Francisco Presidio; the wave had an amplitude of approximately 3 inches (7.6 cm) and an approximate period of 40–45 minutes.

Analysis of triangulation data before and after the earthquake strongly suggests that the rupture along the San Andreas Fault was about 310 miles (500 km) in length, in agreement with observed intensity data. The available seismological data support a significantly shorter rupture length, but these observations can be reconciled by allowing propagation at speeds above the S-wave velocity (supershear). Supershear propagation has now been recognized for many earthquakes associated with strike-slip faulting.

In 2019, using an old photograph and a recorded eyewitness account, researchers were able to refine the location of the hypocenter of the earthquake as offshore from San Francisco or near San Juan Bautista, confirming previous estimates.

=== Intensity ===
The shaking intensity as described on the Modified Mercalli intensity scale reached XI (Extreme) in San Francisco and areas to the north like Santa Rosa where destruction was devastating.

The most important characteristic of the shaking intensity noted in Andrew Lawson's 1908 report was the clear correlation of intensity with underlying geologic conditions. Areas situated in sediment-filled valleys sustained stronger shaking than nearby bedrock sites, and the strongest shaking occurred in areas of former bay where soil liquefaction had occurred. Modern seismic-zonation practice accounts for the differences in hazard posed by varying geologic conditions.

=== Aftershocks ===
The main shock was followed by many aftershocks and some remotely triggered events. As with the 1857 Fort Tejon earthquake, there were fewer aftershocks than would have been expected for a shock of that size. Very few of them were located along the trace of the 1906 rupture, tending to concentrate near the ends of the rupture or on other structures away from the San Andreas Fault, such as the Hayward Fault. The only aftershock in the first few days of near M_{I} 5 or greater occurred near Santa Cruz at 14:28 PST on April 18, with a magnitude of about 4.9 M. The largest aftershock happened at 01:10 PST on April 23, west of Eureka with an estimated magnitude of about 6.7 M_{I}, with another of the same size more than three years later at 22:45 PST on October 28 near Cape Mendocino.

Remotely triggered events included an earthquake swarm in the Imperial Valley area, which culminated in an earthquake of about 6.1 M_{I} at 16:30 PST on April 18, 1906. Another event of this type occurred at 12:31 PST on April 19, 1906, with an estimated magnitude of about 5.0 M_{I}, and an epicenter beneath Santa Monica Bay.

== Damage ==
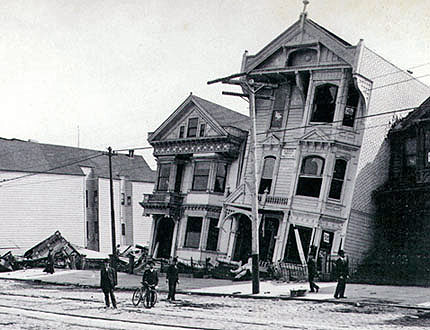
Damaged houses on Howard Street

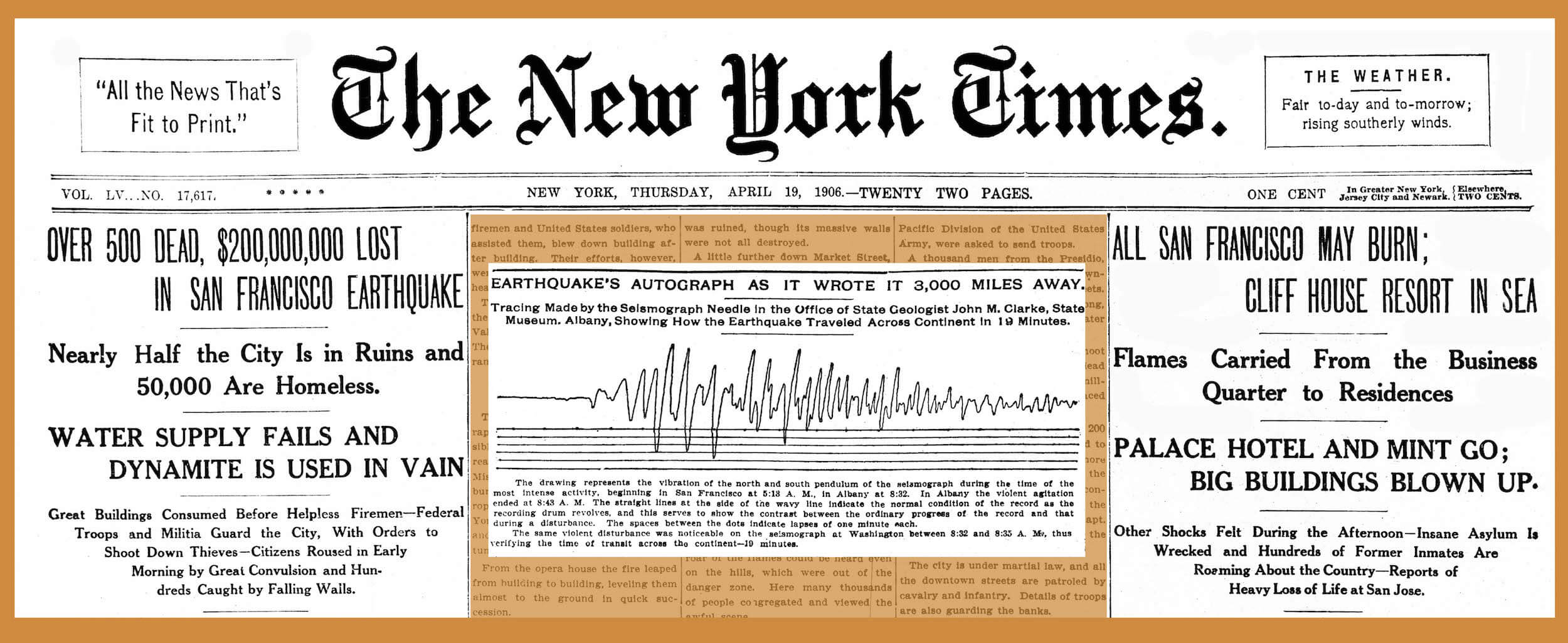
Seismographs on the U.S. east coast recorded the earthquake some 19 minutes later. Some early death estimates exceeded 500.

Early death counts ranged from 375 to over 500. However, hundreds of fatalities in Chinatown went ignored and unrecorded. The total number of deaths is still uncertain, but various reports presented a range of 700–3,000+. In 2005, the city's Board of Supervisors voted unanimously in support of a resolution written by novelist James Dalessandro ("1906") and city historian Gladys Hansen ("Denial of Disaster") to recognize the figure of 3,000+ as the official total. Most of the deaths occurred within San Francisco, but 189 were reported elsewhere in the Bay Area; nearby cities such as Santa Rosa and San Jose also suffered severe damage.

Between 227,000 and 300,000 people were left homeless out of a population of about 410,000; half of those who evacuated fled across the bay to Oakland and Berkeley. Newspapers described Golden Gate Park, the Presidio, the Panhandle and the beaches between Ingleside and North Beach as covered with makeshift tents. More than two years later, many of these refugee camps were still in operation.

Selected Mercalli intensities
MMI	Locations
MMI XI (Extreme)	San Francisco, Santa Rosa
MMI X (Extreme)	Sebastopol, San Bruno
MMI IX (Violent)	San Jose, Point Arena
MMI VIII (Severe)	Eureka, Salinas
MMI VII (Very strong)	Truckee, Parkfield
MMI VI (Strong)	Willows, Fresno
MMI V (Moderate)	Chico, Paso Robles
MMI IV (Light)	Dunsmuir, Bakersfield
MMI III (Weak)	Santa Monica, Indio
U.S. Earthquake Intensity Database, NGDC

The earthquake and fire left long-standing and significant pressures on the development of California. At the time of the disaster, San Francisco had been the ninth-largest city in the United States and the largest on the West Coast. Over a period of 60 years, the city had become the financial, trade, and cultural center of the West, operating the busiest port on the West Coast. It was the "gateway to the Pacific", through which growing U.S. economic and military power was projected into the Pacific and Asia. Over 80% of the city was destroyed by the earthquake and fire. Though San Francisco rebuilt quickly, the disaster diverted trade, industry, and population growth south to Los Angeles, which during the 20th century became the largest and most important urban area in the West. Many of the city's leading poets and writers retreated to Carmel-by-the-Sea where, as "The Barness", they established the arts colony reputation that continues today.

The 1908 Lawson Report, a study of the 1906 quake led and edited by Professor Andrew Lawson of the University of California, showed that the same San Andreas Fault which had caused the disaster in San Francisco ran close to Los Angeles as well. The earthquake was the first natural disaster of its magnitude to be documented by photography and motion picture footage and occurred at a time when the science of seismology was blossoming.

== Survivor accounts ==
Writing from San Francisco on April 23, five days after the earthquake, resident John W. Nourse described the scene to his family in Indiana: woken at quarter past five by shaking that made the house "seem like it would break all to pieces," he looked out to see a large brick building completely destroyed in seconds, with fires visible simultaneously to the right, front, and left. Grabbing the baby's buggy, he and his wife Lena fled to Market Street, which he described as a terrible sight. Whole blocks reduced to masses of ruins, City Hall a complete wreck. He left his wife and baby at the mission and returned to try to save their belongings, but found the whole part of the city burning. He and his family spent the night in the hills, watching twelve and twenty story buildings burning and falling, "a sight no one can describe." He noted that some streets had sunk several feet while others had risen, the city was under martial law, and provisions were beginning to arrive from surrounding towns. "In traveling over the city it looks like there is not a building but what is more or less damaged," he wrote.

A traveler passing through San Francisco ten days after the earthquake, Mrs. C. C. Baughman of LeMars, Iowa, described a stove placed in front of every house, residents were not permitted to cook indoors, and Market Street sunken several feet in places, with one location four blocks from the Ferry five feet lower than the sidewalk and the cable car rails warped and twisted. She observed soldiers with blue coats throughout the begrimed crowds, groups of listless dazed men in the suburbs, and frame buildings near Valencia Street completely shattered within a radius of several blocks. "The sights of the ruins are awful," she wrote, "and the scenes that transpired there during the terrible catastrophe are beyond the description of either tongue or pen." She and her husband, who had planned to settle permanently in California, left with "no desire to locate there permanently."

Writing from Boulder Creek, eighty miles south of San Francisco, former journalist Mathias Forestburg described being violently awakened by the shaking, the house rocking like a boat with timbers creaking and everything thrown to the floor. He spent the morning dismantling a cracked chimney that was balanced on three bricks. One more aftershock would have brought it down and demolished the house. He reported continual shaking every day and night since the earthquake, keeping the community on constant alert, and noted that all business had stopped and all who could afford to leave were going east.

The most immediate firsthand account came from Lewis A. Spitzer of San Jose, who wrote to his brother-in-law in Virginia at midnight on the day of the earthquake itself. Spitzer had been staying at a mineral spring in the mountains the previous night; waking just before 5 AM, he was thrown against the wall at 5:15 as the shock struck while he was putting a pan of water on the stove. Electric cars had stopped running and he hired a farmer to bring him home by buggy. He found his house standing with only cracked plaster, but described San Jose as "in ruins. Fine business houses flat on the ground" and San Francisco as nearly all in ruins and in flames. His son-in-law had arrived from San Francisco reporting that Spitzer's son and his wife and baby appeared to have escaped safely, but the family could not reach them. The streets were full of people camping in tents, some without tents, afraid to go indoors. "I have seen many heart rending scenes in my life," he wrote, "but never any such a terrible scene as this. In my opinion it will take fifty years for this State to recover from this awful affair."

=== Other cities ===
Although the impact of the earthquake on San Francisco was the most famous, the earthquake also inflicted considerable damage on several other cities. These include San Jose and Santa Rosa, the entire downtown of which was essentially destroyed. C. A. Duffy of Owensboro, Kentucky, who had been staying at the St. Rose Hotel in Santa Rosa, reported being trapped for five hours in the ruins before rescuers reached him. He finally made his location known by poking a lath through a hole left by a falling steam pipe. Duffy estimated that about 300 people were killed in the destruction of the town's three hotels alone and not less than 500 in the whole town, that the entire business section collapsed to the ground in approximately five minutes, and that fire subsequently started at each end of town simultaneously and burned toward the middle. He described seeing two arms protruding from the debris waving frantically before the flames swept over them: "The sight sickened me and I turned away."

== Fires ==
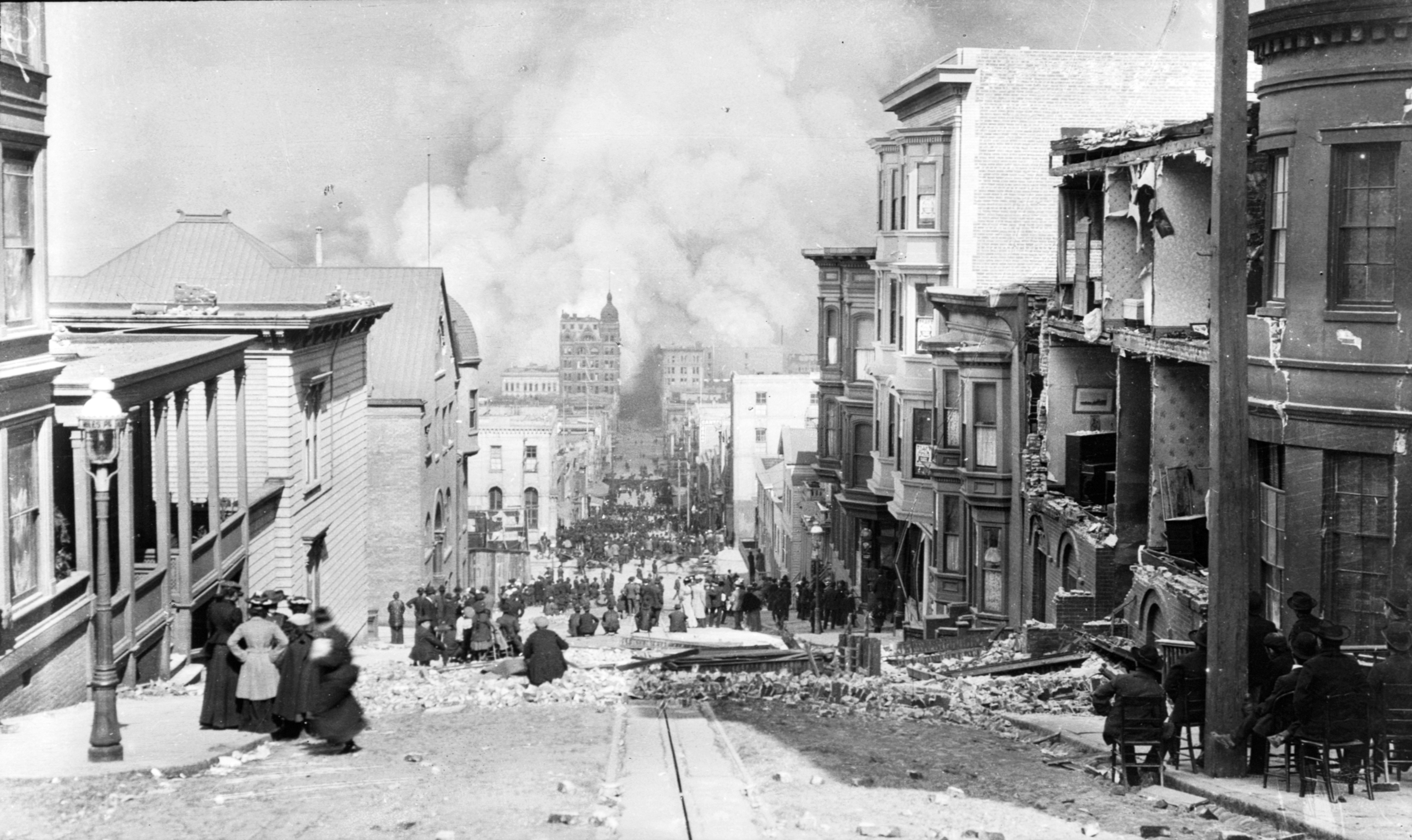
Arnold Genthe's photograph, looking toward the fire on Sacramento Street

As damaging as the earthquake and its aftershocks were, the fires that burned out of control afterward were far more destructive. It has been estimated that at least 80%, and at most 95%, of the total destruction was the result of the subsequent fires. Within three days, over 30 fires, that were caused by ruptured gas mains, destroyed approximately 25,000 buildings on 490 city blocks. The fires cost an estimated $350 million at the time (equivalent to $9.4 billion in 2025).

The Ham and Eggs fire, in the morning on the 18th, at Hayes and Gough Streets, in Hayes Valley, was started by a woman who lit her stove to prepare breakfast, unaware of the badly damaged chimney, destroying a 30-block area, including a college, the Hall of Records and City Hall.

Some of the fires were started when San Francisco Fire Department firefighters, untrained in the use of dynamite, attempted to demolish buildings to create firebreaks. The dynamited buildings often caught fire. The city's fire chief, Dennis T. Sullivan, who would have been responsible for coordinating firefighting efforts, had died from injuries sustained in the initial quake. In total, the fires burned for four days and nights.

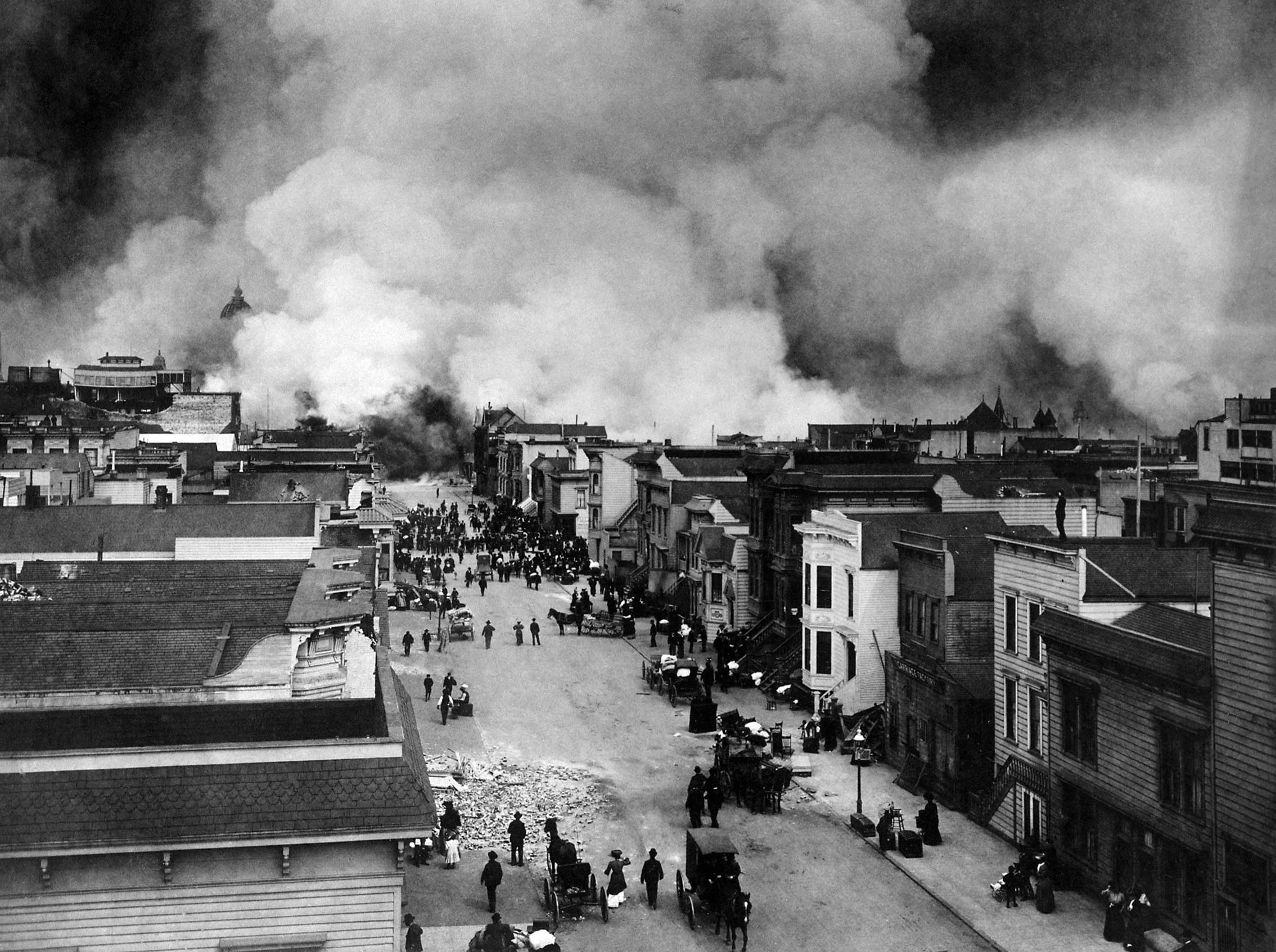
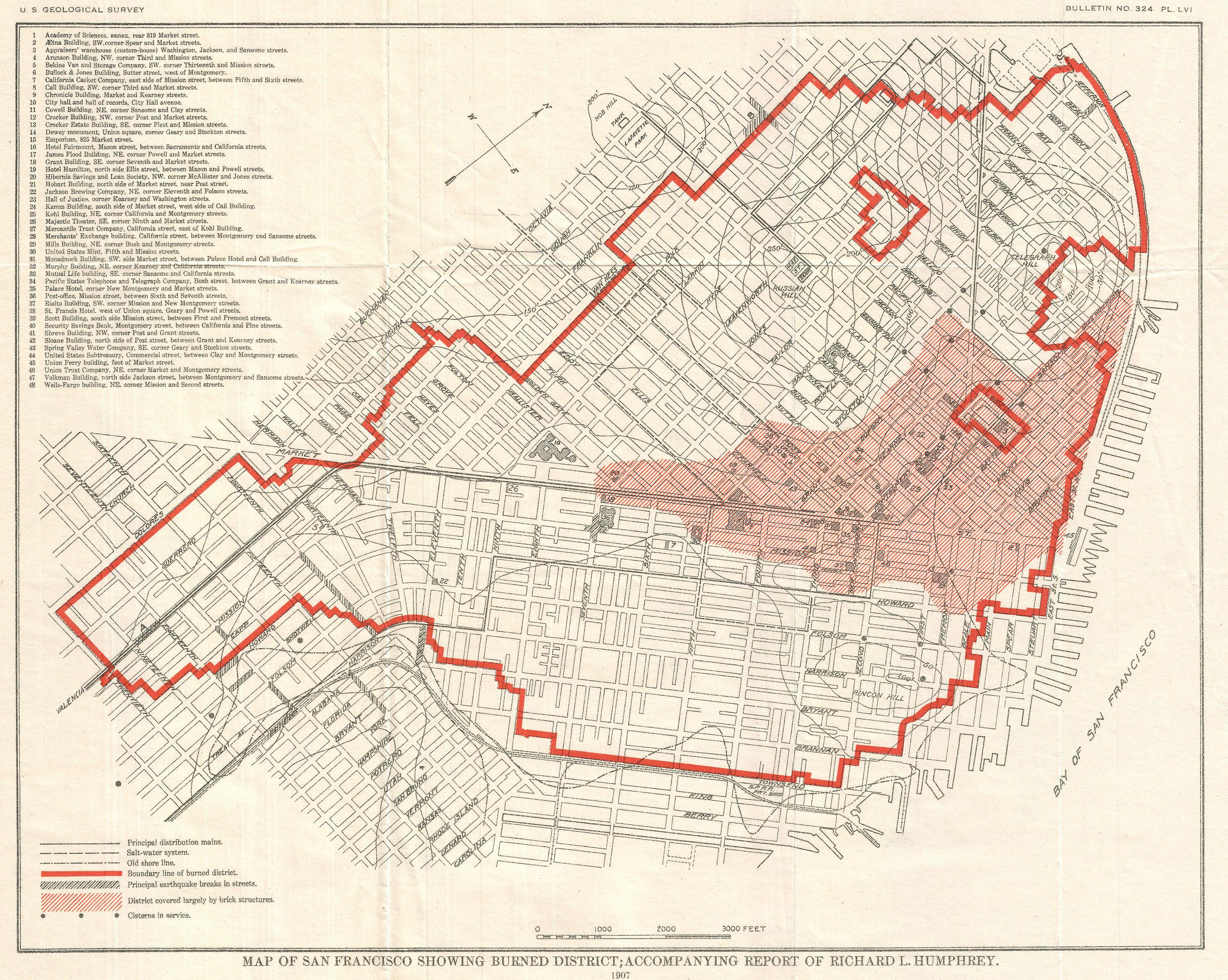
Burning of the Mission District (left) and a map showing the extent of the fire

Most of the destruction in the city was attributed to the fires, since widespread practice by insurers was to indemnify San Francisco properties from fire but not from earthquake damage. A Boulder Creek resident writing to friends in North Dakota five days after the earthquake confirmed the same practice from personal experience, noting that insurance companies "will insure against fire, will not insure against earthquakes." Some property owners deliberately set fire to damaged properties to claim them on their insurance. Captain Leonard D. Wildman of the U.S. Army Signal Corps reported that he "was stopped by a fireman who told me that people in that neighborhood were firing their houses...they were told that they would not get their insurance on buildings damaged by the earthquake unless they were damaged by fire".

One landmark building lost in the fire was the Palace Hotel, subsequently rebuilt, which had many famous visitors including royalty and celebrated performers. It was constructed in 1875 primarily financed by Bank of California co-founder William Ralston, the "man who built San Francisco." In April 1906, the tenor Enrico Caruso and members of the Metropolitan Opera Company came to San Francisco to give a series of performances at the Grand Opera House. The night after Caruso's performance in Carmen, the tenor was awakened in the early morning in his Palace Hotel suite by a strong jolt. Clutching an autographed photo of President Theodore Roosevelt, Caruso made an effort to get out of the city, first by boat and then by train, and vowed never to return. The Metropolitan Opera Company lost all of its traveling sets and costumes.

[[:File:The Story of An Eyewitness by Jack London - read by Elaine Hamby for LibriVox's Short Nonfiction Collection Vol. 006 (2007).ogg|]]
Audio 00:18:06 (full text)

Some of the greatest losses from fire were in scientific laboratories. Alice Eastwood, the curator of botany at the California Academy of Sciences in San Francisco, is credited with saving the entire plant type specimen collection of the Academy before the remainder of the largest botanical collection in the western United States was destroyed in the fire. The entire laboratory and all the records of Benjamin R. Jacobs, a biochemist who was researching the nutrition of everyday foods, were destroyed. The original California flag used in the 1846 Bear Flag Revolt at Sonoma, stored in a state building in San Francisco, was also destroyed in the fire.

== Response ==
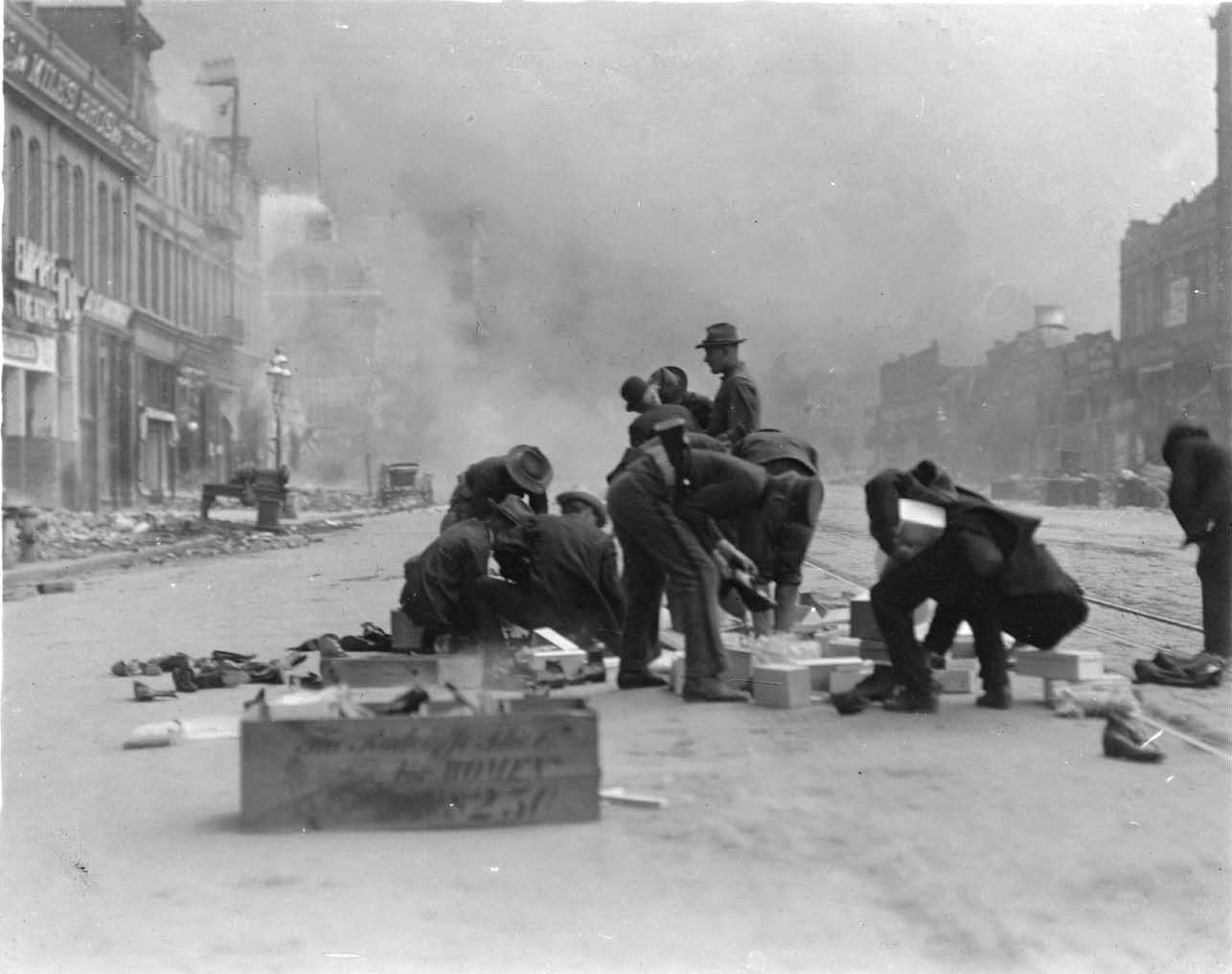
Soldiers allegedly looting during the fire

The city's fire chief, Dennis T. Sullivan, was gravely injured when the earthquake first struck and later died from his injuries. Sullivan and his wife had been sleeping in the engine house adjoining the California Hotel on Bush Street when bricks crashed through the roof. The interim fire chief sent an urgent request to the Presidio for dynamite. General Frederick Funston had already decided that the situation required the use of federal troops. Telephoning a San Francisco Police Department officer, he sent word to Mayor Eugene Schmitz of his decision to assist and then ordered federal troops from nearby Angel Island to mobilize and enter the city. Explosives were ferried across the bay from the California Powder Works in what is now Hercules.

During the first few days, soldiers provided valuable services like patrolling streets to discourage looting and guarding buildings such as the U.S. Mint, post office, and county jail. They aided the fire department in dynamiting to demolish buildings in the path of the fires. The Army also became responsible for feeding, sheltering, and clothing the tens of thousands of displaced residents of the city. Under the command of Funston's superior, Major General Adolphus Greely, Commanding Officer of the Pacific Division, over 4,000 federal troops saw service during the emergency. Police officers, firefighters, and soldiers would regularly commandeer passing civilians for work details to remove rubble and assist in rescues. On July 1, 1906, non-military authorities assumed responsibility for relief efforts, and the Army withdrew from the city.

Mayor Schmitz's proclamation authorizing law enforcement to shoot looters on sight, dated April 18, 1906

On April 18, in response to riots among evacuees and looting, Mayor Schmitz issued and ordered posted a proclamation that "The Federal Troops, the members of the Regular Police Force and all Special Police Officers have been authorized by me to kill any and all persons found engaged in Looting or in the Commission of Any Other Crime". Accusations of soldiers engaging in looting also surfaced.

Retired Captain Edward Ord of the 22nd Infantry Regiment was appointed a special police officer by Schmitz and liaised with Greely for relief work with the 22nd Infantry and other military units involved in the emergency. Ord later wrote a long letter to his mother on April 20 regarding Schmitz's "Shoot-to-Kill" order and some "despicable" behavior of certain soldiers of the 22nd Infantry who were looting. He also made it clear that the majority of soldiers served the community well.

== Aftermath ==
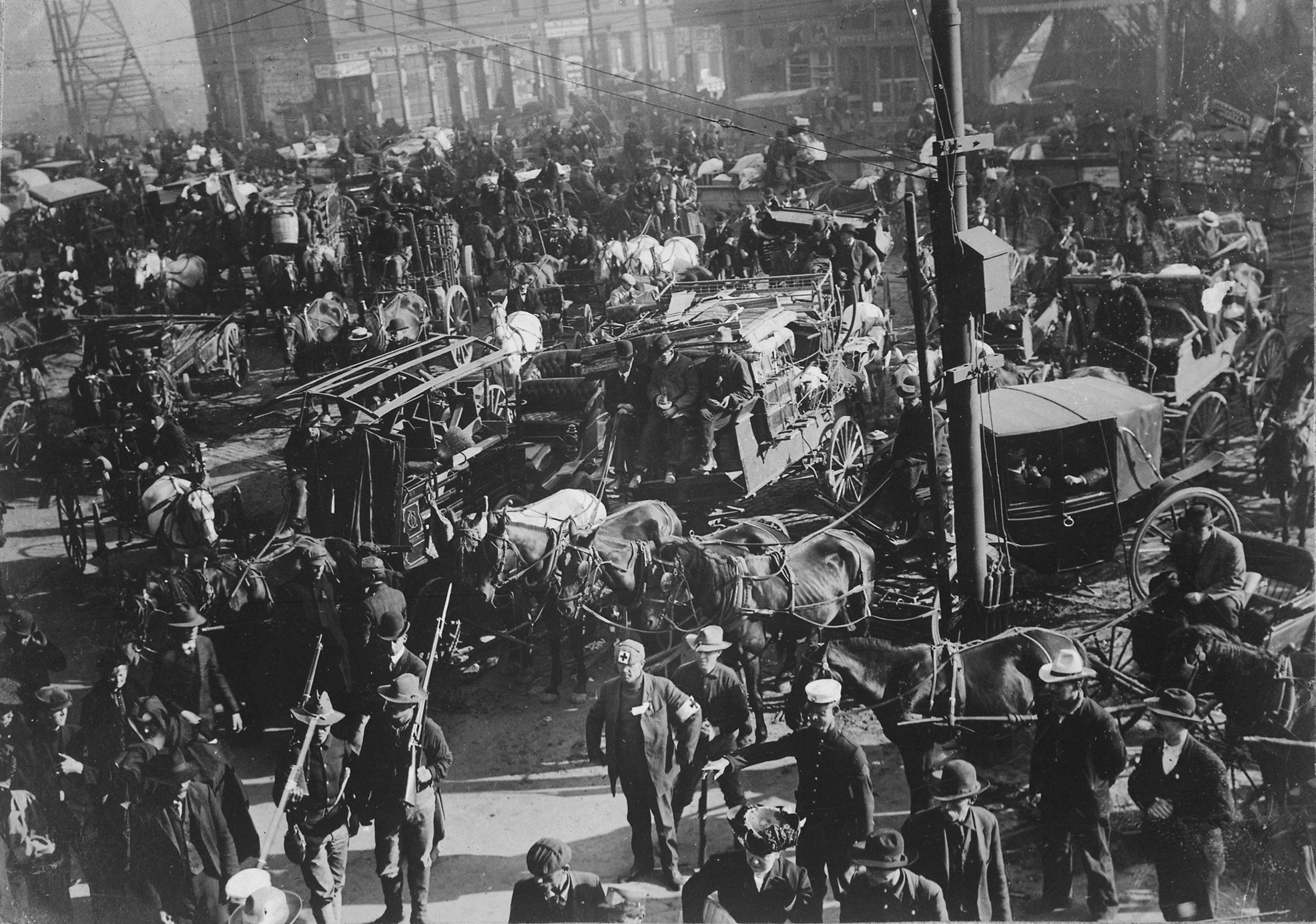
Evacuees fleeing the city

Film shot on April 18, 1906, of the wreckage

Property losses from the disaster have been estimated to be more than $400 million in 1906 dollars. This is equivalent to $10.7 billion in 2025 dollars. An insurance industry source tallies insured losses at $235 million, the equivalent to $6.3 billion in 2025 dollars.

Political and business leaders strongly downplayed the effects of the earthquake, fearing loss of outside investment in the city which was badly needed to rebuild. In his first public statement, California Governor George Pardee emphasized the need to rebuild quickly: "This is not the first time that San Francisco has been destroyed by fire, I have not the slightest doubt that the City by the Golden Gate will be speedily rebuilt, and will, almost before we know it, resume her former great activity". The earthquake is not even mentioned in the statement. Fatality and monetary damage estimates were manipulated.

Almost immediately after the quake (and even during the disaster), planning and reconstruction plans were hatched to quickly rebuild the city. Rebuilding funds were immediately tied up by the fact that virtually all the major banks had been sites of the conflagration, requiring a lengthy wait of seven to ten days before their fire-proof vaults could cool sufficiently to be safely opened. The Bank of Italy (now Bank of America) had evacuated its funds and was able to provide liquidity in the immediate aftermath. Its president also immediately chartered and financed the sending of two ships to return with shiploads of lumber from Washington and Oregon mills which provided the initial reconstruction materials and surge.

In an article written in 1913, John C. Branner, who was the first to begin study of the San Andreas fault in 1891 complained that the Federal Government of the United States had not conducted the serious studies that were needed to gather data about earthquakes on the west coast. He said public discussion was being stifled by fears that acknowledgement of earthquakes would drive away business and investors, and that geologists were told not to gather information about the 1906 earthquake, and certainly to not publish it. Some people went as far as to deny that an earthquake had happened. Branner argued that preparation for earthquakes was possible and necessary:

The only way we know of to deal successfully with any natural phenomenon is to get acquainted with it, to find out all we can about it, and thus to meet it on its own grounds. That is the way mankind has succeeded thus far, and it is safe to conclude that it is the only way it will ever succeed.

Eleven days after the earthquake a rare Sunday baseball game was played in New York City (which would not allow regular Sunday baseball until 1919) between the Highlanders (soon to be the Yankees) and the Philadelphia Athletics to raise money for quake survivors. William James, the pioneering American psychologist, was teaching at Stanford at the time of the earthquake and traveled into San Francisco to observe first-hand its aftermath. He was most impressed by the positive attitude of the survivors and the speed with which they improvised services and created order out of chaos. This formed the basis of the chapter "On some Mental Effects of the Earthquake" in his book Memories and Studies.

H. G. Wells had just arrived in New York on his first visit to America when he learned of the San Francisco earthquake. What struck him about the reaction of those around him was that "it does not seem to have affected any one with a sense of final destruction, with any foreboding of irreparable disaster. Every one is talking of it this afternoon, and no one is in the least degree dismayed. I have talked and listened in two clubs, watched people in cars and in the street, and one man is glad that Chinatown will be cleared out for good; another's chief solicitude is for Millet's Man with a Hoe. 'They'll cut it out of the frame,' he says, a little anxiously. 'Sure.' But there is no doubt anywhere that San Francisco can be rebuilt, larger, better, and soon. Just as there would be none at all if all this New York that has so obsessed me with its limitless bigness was itself a blazing ruin. I believe these people would more than half like the situation."

=== Reconstruction ===
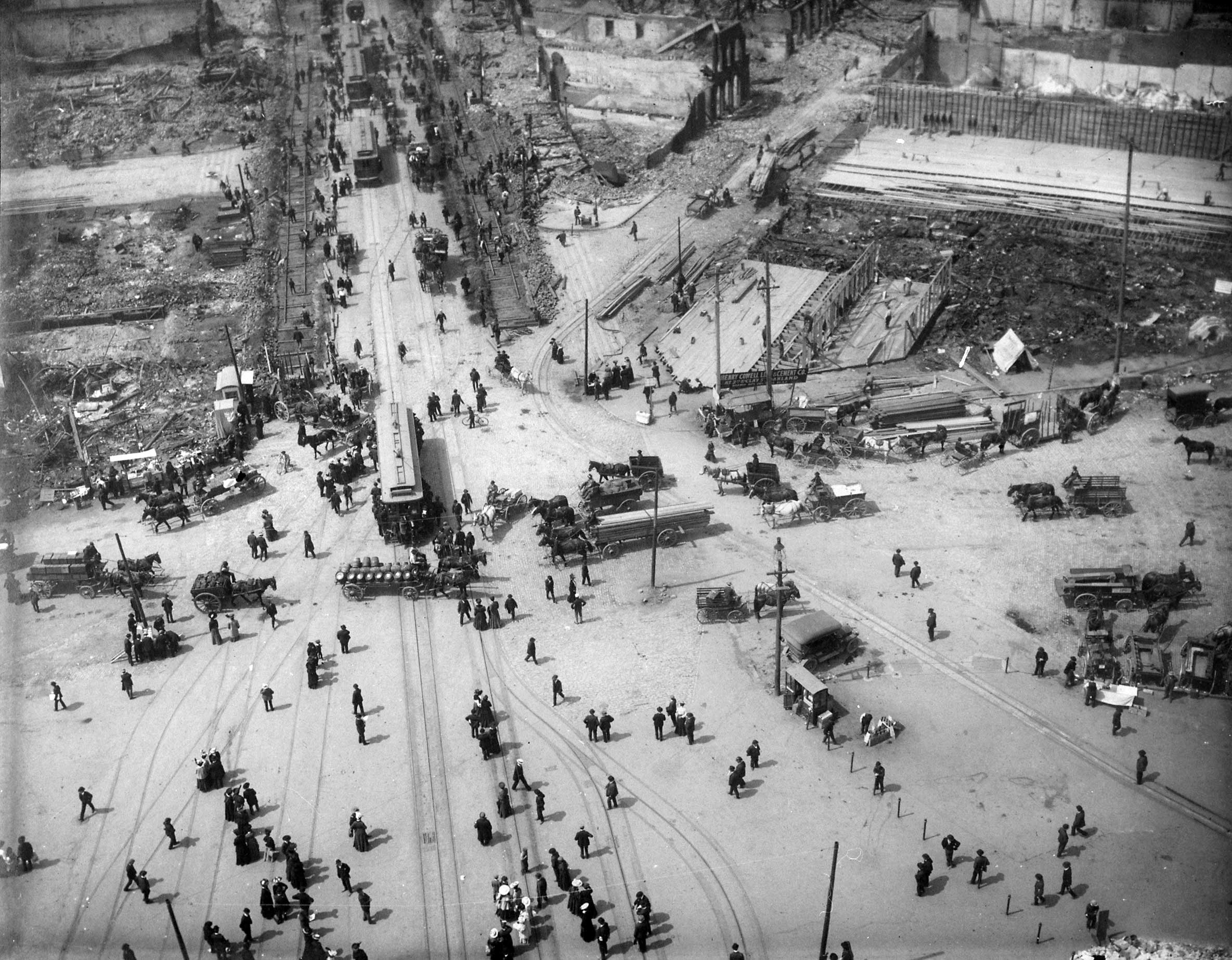
A view from the Ferry Building tower, southwest down on Market Street

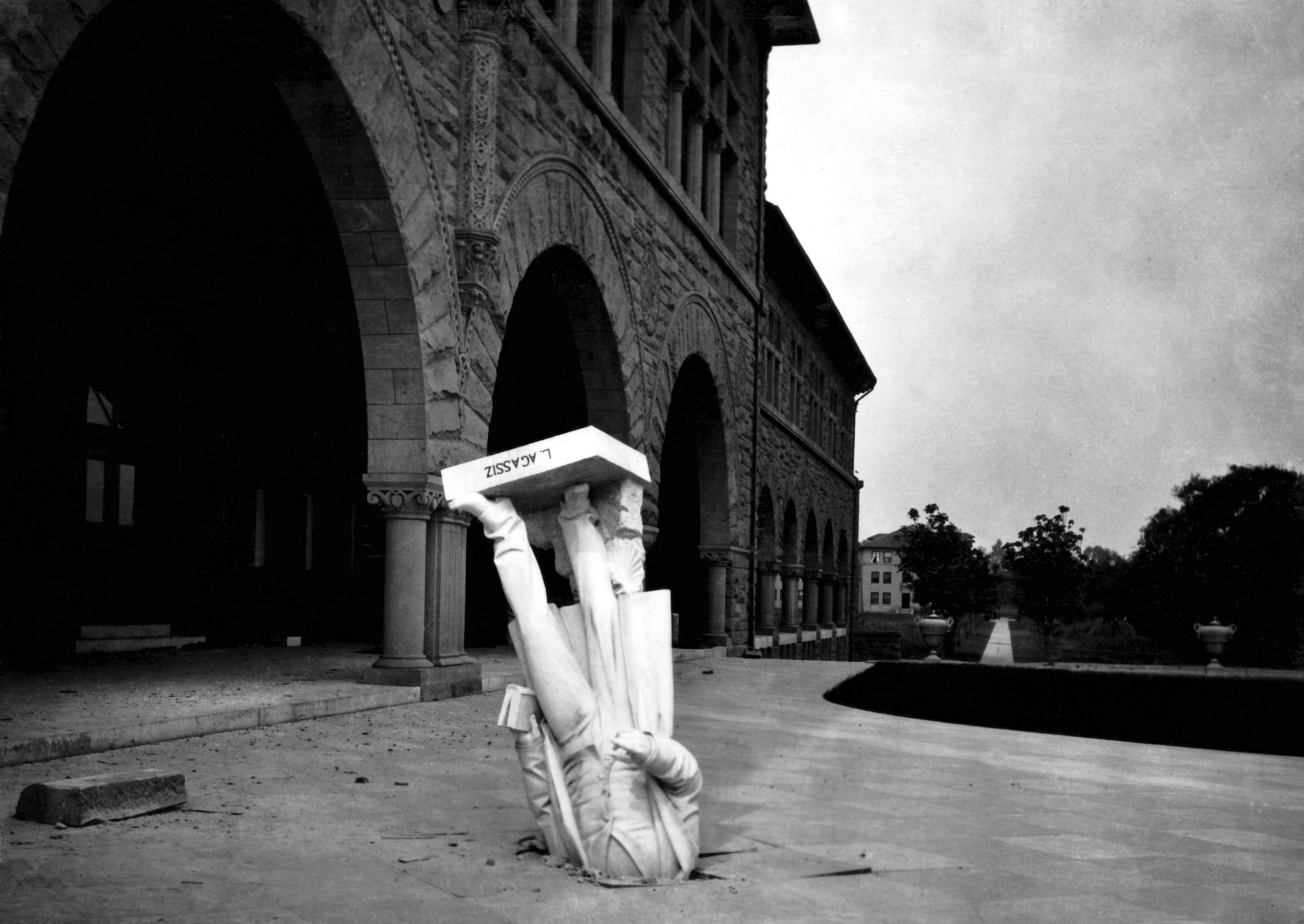
The Agassiz statue in front of the Zoology building, now building 420, Stanford University

The earthquake was crucial in the development of the University of California, San Francisco and its medical facilities. Until 1906, the school faculty had provided care at the City-County Hospital (now the San Francisco General Hospital), but did not have a hospital of its own. Following the 1906 San Francisco earthquake, more than 40,000 people were relocated to a makeshift tent city in Golden Gate Park and were treated by the faculty of the Affiliated Colleges. This brought the school, which until then was located on the western outskirts of the city, in contact with significant population and fueled the commitment of the school towards civic responsibility and health care, increasing the momentum towards the construction of its own health facilities. In April 1907, one of the buildings was renovated for outpatient care with 75 beds. This created the need to train nursing students, and the UC Training School for Nurses was established, adding a fourth professional school to the Affiliated Colleges.

The grandeur of citywide reconstruction schemes required investment from Eastern monetary sources, hence the spin and de-emphasis of the earthquake, the promulgation of the tough new building codes, and subsequent reputation sensitive actions such as the official low death toll. One of the more famous and ambitious plans came from famed urban planner Daniel Burnham. His bold plan called for, among other proposals, Haussmann-style avenues, boulevards, arterial thoroughfares that radiated across the city, a massive civic center complex with classical structures, and what would have been the largest urban park in the world, stretching from Twin Peaks to Lake Merced with a large atheneum at its peak. But this plan was dismissed during the aftermath of the earthquake. For example, real estate investors and other land owners were against the idea because of the large amount of land the city would have to purchase to realize such proposals.

While the original street grid was restored, many of Burnham's proposals inadvertently saw the light of day, such as a neoclassical civic center complex, wider streets, a preference of arterial thoroughfares, a subway under Market Street, a more people-friendly Fisherman's Wharf, and a monument to the city on Telegraph Hill, Coit Tower. Limestone used to reconstruct city buildings was quarried at the nearby Rockaway Quarry.

City fathers likewise attempted at the time to eliminate the Chinese population and export Chinatown (and other poor populations) to the edge of the county where the Chinese could still contribute to the local taxbase. The Chinese occupants had other ideas and prevailed instead. Chinatown was rebuilt in the newer, modern, Western form that exists today. The destruction of City Hall and the Hall of Records enabled thousands of Chinese immigrants to claim residency and citizenship, creating a backdoor to the Chinese Exclusion Act, and bring in their relatives from China.

The earthquake was also responsible for the development of the Pacific Heights neighborhood. The immense power of the earthquake had destroyed almost all of the mansions on Nob Hill except for the James C. Flood Mansion. Others that had not been destroyed were dynamited by the Army forces aiding the firefighting efforts in attempts to create firebreaks. As one indirect result, the wealthy looked westward where the land was cheap and relatively undeveloped, and where there were better views. Constructing new mansions without reclaiming and clearing rubble simply sped attaining new homes in the tent city during the reconstruction.

Reconstruction was swift, and largely completed by 1915, in time for the 1915 Panama–Pacific International Exposition which celebrated the reconstruction of the city and its "rise from the ashes". Since 1915, the city has officially commemorated the disaster each year by gathering the remaining survivors at Lotta's Fountain, a fountain in the city's financial district that served as a meeting point during the disaster for people to look for loved ones and exchange information.

=== Housing ===
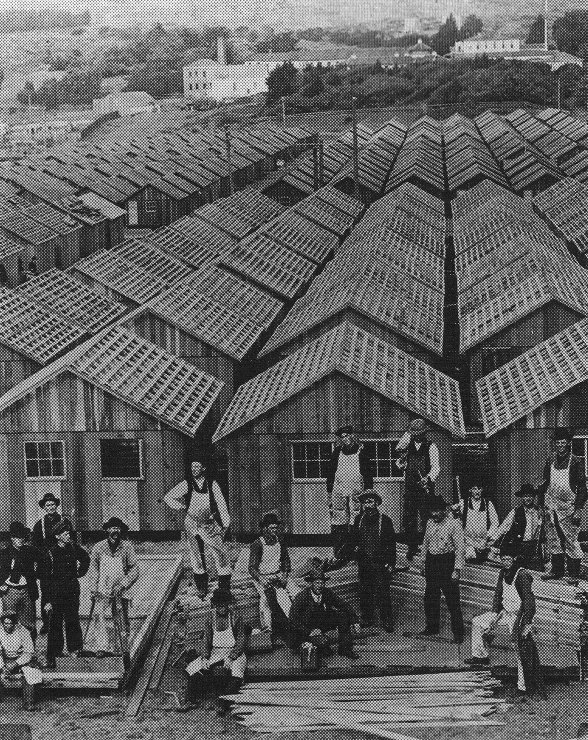
One of the 11 housing camps

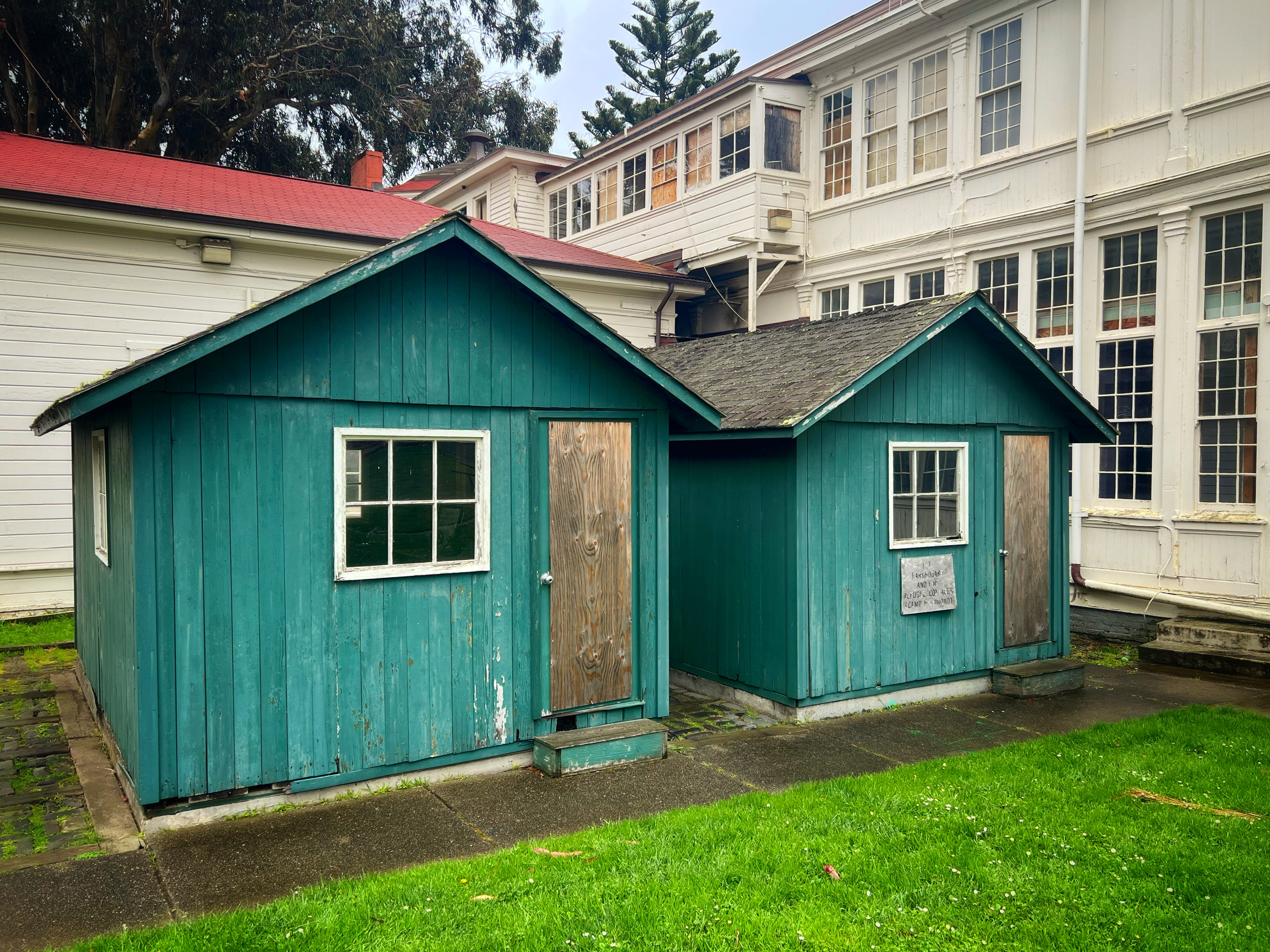
Restored earthquake relief cottages visible today in the Presidio

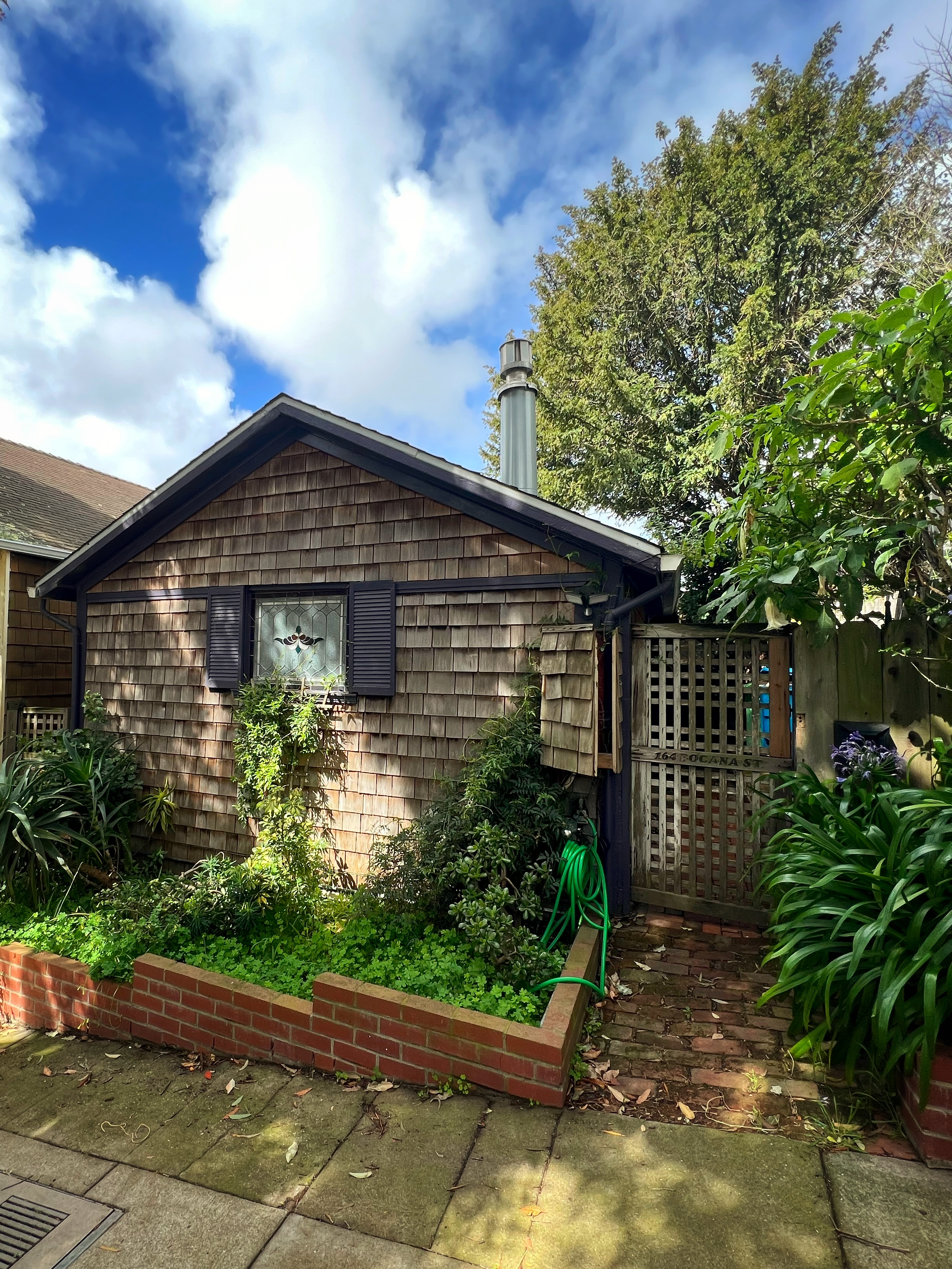
A surviving earthquake relief cottage, now part of a private home

The Army built 5,610 redwood and fir "relief houses" to accommodate 20,000 displaced people. The houses were designed by John McLaren, and were grouped in 11 camps, packed close to each other and rented to people for two dollars per month until rebuilding was completed. They were painted navy blue, partly to blend in with the site and partly because the military had large quantities of navy blue paint on hand. The camps had a peak population of 16,448 people, but by 1907 most people had moved out. The camps were then re-used as garages, storage spaces or shops. The cottages cost on average $100 to build. The $2 monthly rents went towards the full purchase price of $50. The last official refugee camp was closed on June 30, 1908.

Most of the cottages have been destroyed, but at least 30 survived. Of the remaining structures, there is a historically restored pair in the Presidio. Others have been built on as part of private homes, with a high concentration around the Bernal Heights neighborhood. One of the modest 720 sq ft (67 m^{2}) homes was purchased in 2006 for more than $600,000.

A 2017 study found that the fire had the effect of increasing the share of land used for nonresidential purposes: "Overall, relative to unburned blocks, residential land shares on burned blocks fell while nonresidential land shares rose by 1931. The study also provides insight into what held the city back from making these changes before 1906: the presence of old residential buildings. In reconstruction, developers built relatively fewer of these buildings, and the majority of the reduction came through single-family houses. Aside from merely expanding nonresidential uses in many neighborhoods, the fire created economic opportunities in new areas, resulting in clusters of business activity that emerged only in the wake of the disaster. These effects of the fire still remain today, and thus large shocks can be sufficient catalysts for permanently reshaping urban settings."

=== Relief ===
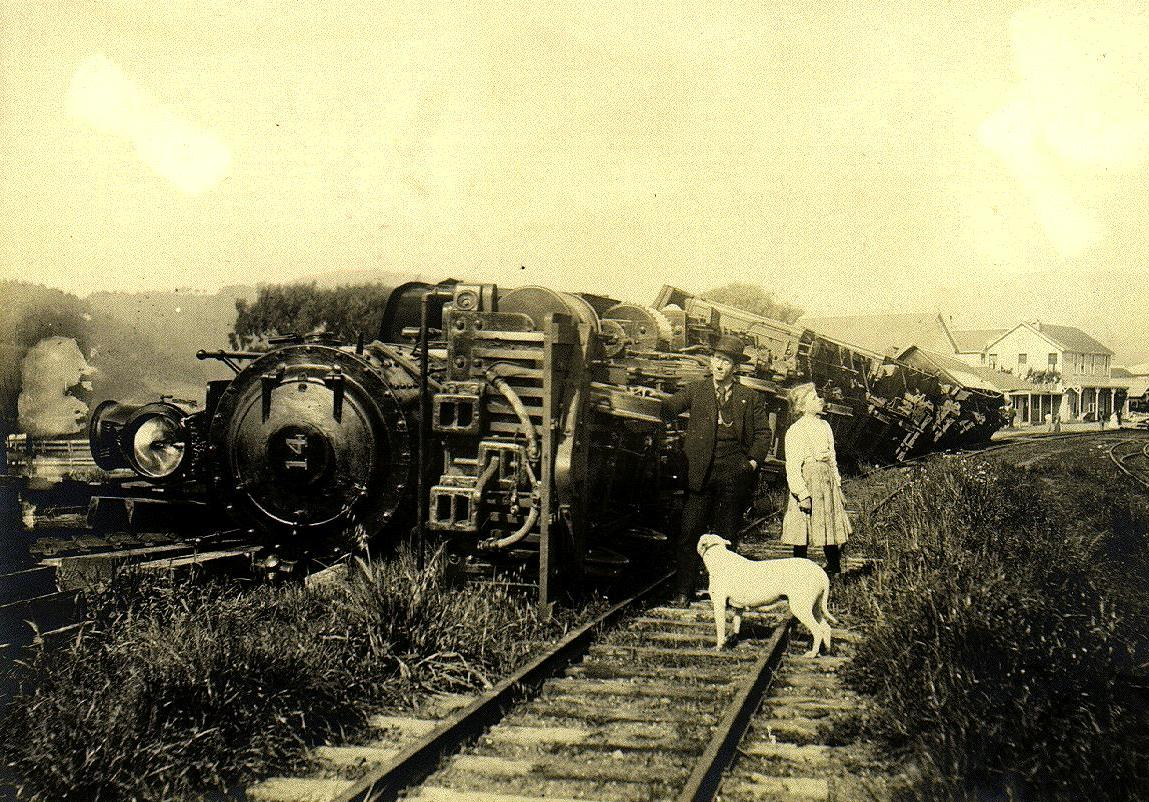
A derailed locomotive

During the first few days after news of the disaster reached the rest of the world, relief efforts reached over $5,000,000, equivalent to $179,170,000 in 2025. London raised hundreds of thousands of dollars. Individual citizens and businesses donated large sums of money for the relief effort: Standard Oil and Andrew Carnegie each gave $100,000; the Parliament of Canada made a special appropriation of $100,000; and even the Bank of Canada in Ottawa gave $25,000. The United States Congress quickly appropriated 2.5 million dollars for relief supplies which were immediately rushed to the area, including supplies for food kitchens and many thousands of tents that city dwellers would occupy the next several years.

These relief efforts were not enough to get families on their feet again, and consequently the burden was placed on wealthier members of the city, who were reluctant to assist in the rebuilding of homes they were not responsible for. All residents were eligible for daily meals served from a number of communal soup kitchens, and citizens as far away as Idaho and Utah were known to send daily loaves of bread to San Francisco as relief supplies were coordinated by the railroads.

=== Insurance payments ===
Insurance companies, faced with staggering claims of $250 million, paid out between $235 million and $265 million on policyholders' claims, often for fire damage only, since shake damage from earthquakes was excluded from coverage under most policies. At least 137 insurance companies were directly involved and another 17 as reinsurers. Twenty companies went bankrupt. Lloyd's of London reports having paid all claims in full, more than $50 million, thanks to the leadership of Cuthbert Heath.

Insurance companies in Hartford, Connecticut, report paying every claim in full, with the Hartford Fire Insurance Company paying over $11 million and Aetna Insurance Company almost $3 million. The insurance payments heavily affected the international financial system. Gold transfers from European insurance companies to policyholders in San Francisco led to a rise in interest rates, subsequently to a lack of available loans and finally to the Knickerbocker Trust Company crisis of October 1907 which led to the Panic of 1907.

After the 1906 earthquake, global discussion arose concerning a legally flawless exclusion of the earthquake hazard from fire insurance contracts. It was pressed ahead mainly by re-insurers. Their aim: a uniform solution to insurance payouts resulting from fires caused by earthquakes. Until 1910, a few countries, especially in Europe, followed the call for an exclusion of the earthquake hazard from all fire insurance contracts. In the U.S., the question was discussed differently. But the traumatized public reacted with fierce opposition. In the second half of 1909, the California State Legislature enacted the California Standard Form of Fire Insurance Policy, which did not contain any earthquake clause. Thus the state decided that insurers would have to pay again if another earthquake was followed by fires. Other earthquake-endangered countries followed the California example.

== Centennial commemorations ==
The 1906 Centennial Alliance was set up as a clearing-house for various centennial events commemorating the earthquake. Award presentations, religious services, a National Geographic TV movie, a projection of fire onto the Coit Tower, memorials, and lectures were part of the commemorations. The USGS Earthquake Hazards Program issued a series of Internet documents, and the tourism industry promoted the 100th anniversary as well.

Eleven survivors of the 1906 earthquake attended the centennial commemorations in 2006, including Irma Mae Weule (1899–2008), who was the oldest survivor of the quake at the time of her death in August 2008, aged 109. Vivian Illing (1900–2009) was believed to be the second-oldest survivor at the time of her death, aged 108, leaving Herbert Hamrol (1903–2009) as the last known remaining survivor at the time of his death, aged 106. Another survivor, Libera Armstrong (1902–2007), attended the 2006 anniversary but died in 2007, aged 105.

Shortly after Hamrol's death, two additional survivors were discovered. William Del Monte, then 103, and Jeanette Scola Trapani (1902–2009), 106, stated that they stopped attending events commemorating the earthquake when it became too much trouble for them. Del Monte and another survivor, Rose Cliver (1902–2012), then 106, attended the earthquake reunion celebration on April 18, 2009, the 103rd anniversary of the earthquake.

Nancy Stoner Sage (1905–2010) died, aged 105, in Colorado just three days short of the 104th anniversary of the earthquake on April 18, 2010. Del Monte attended the event at Lotta's Fountain in 2010. 107-year-old George Quilici (1905–2012) died in May 2012, and 113-year-old Ruth Newman (1901–2015) in July 2015. William Del Monte (1906–2016), who died 11 days shy of his 110th birthday, was thought to be the last survivor.

In 2005 the National Film Registry added San Francisco Earthquake and Fire, April 18, 1906, a newsreel documentary made soon after the earthquake, to its list of American films worthy of preservation.

== Willard Worden gallery ==
Working to establish his career as a photographer in San Francisco, Willard Worden seized the opportunity to capture history in the making, recording scenes of the fire and its aftermath using a handheld film camera and a four-by-five-inch view camera with glass negatives; he also photographed damage to the Stanford University campus. The resulting work fed the general public's fascination for sensationalist content, but was also of interest to seismologists, architects, and urban planners, as evidenced by inclusion of his photos in The California Earthquake of April 18, 1906: Report of the State Earthquake Investigation Commission, published by the Carnegie Institution of Washington, DC, in 1908. Worden's gelatin silver prints documenting the destruction were later collected by the Museum of Modern Art in New York, the San Francisco Museum of Modern Art, and the Oakland Museum of California.

After the destruction, all that remained of the Alban N. Towne mansion on Nob Hill were six marble columns and a lintel. When viewed from a certain angle, the empty porch perfectly framed the ruins of the smoldering City Hall. The haunting image became an icon of the 1906 earthquake, due largely to photographs by Worden. In 1909, the columns and lintel were relocated to Golden Gate Park, where, known as Portals of the Past, they became an enduring monument to the city's grief and a symbol of its endurance.

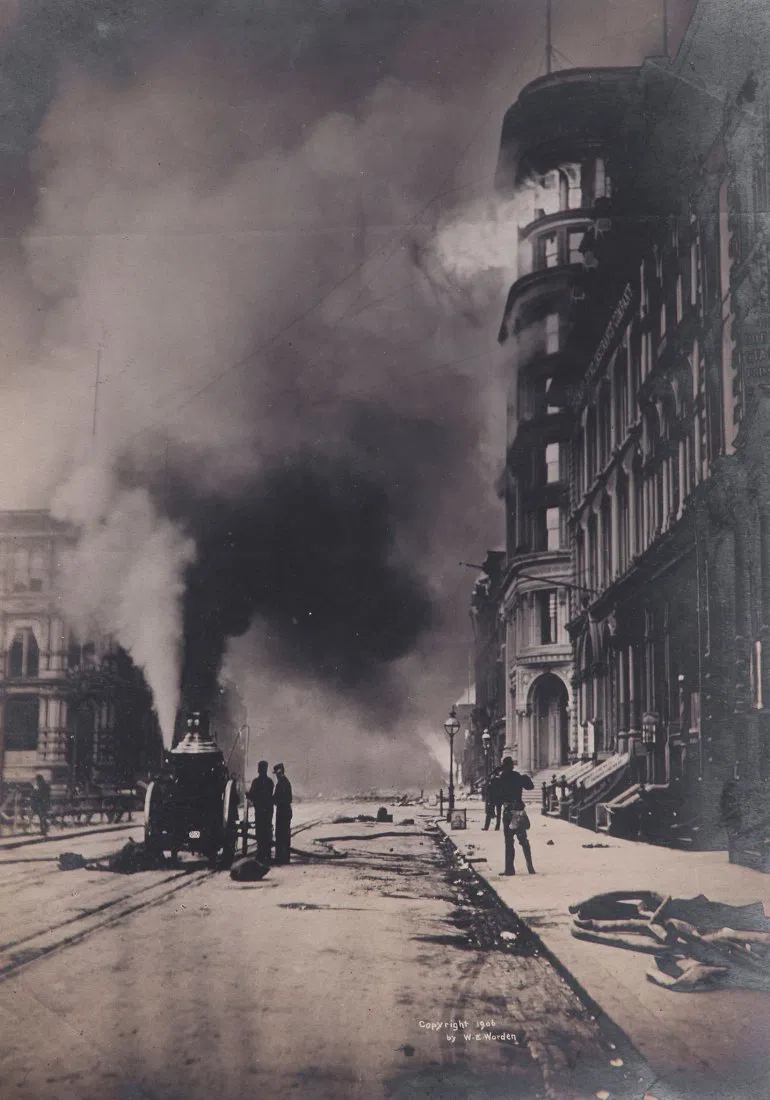
Firefighters

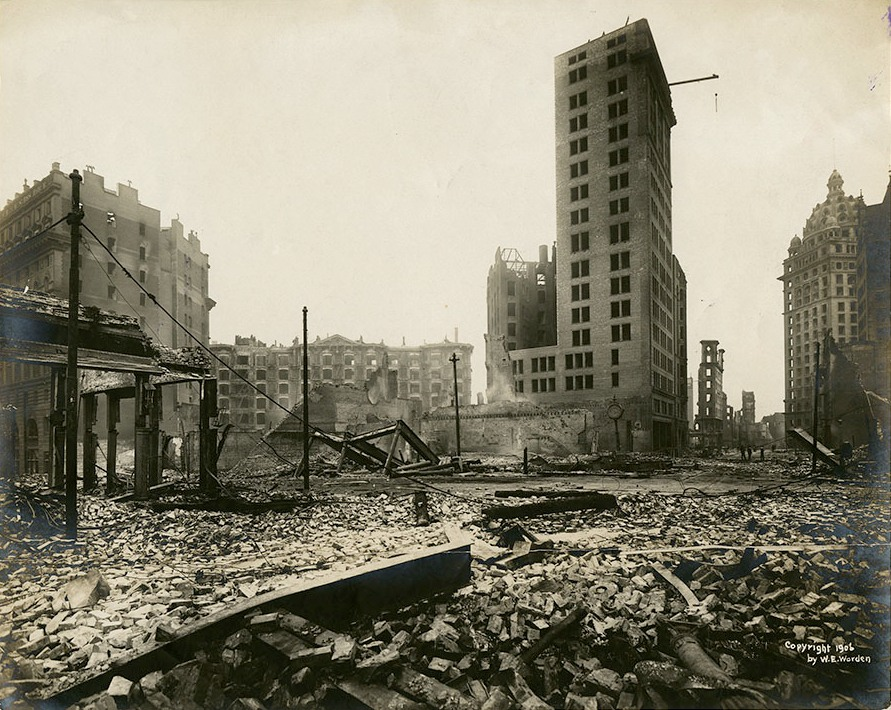
View from Kearny Street

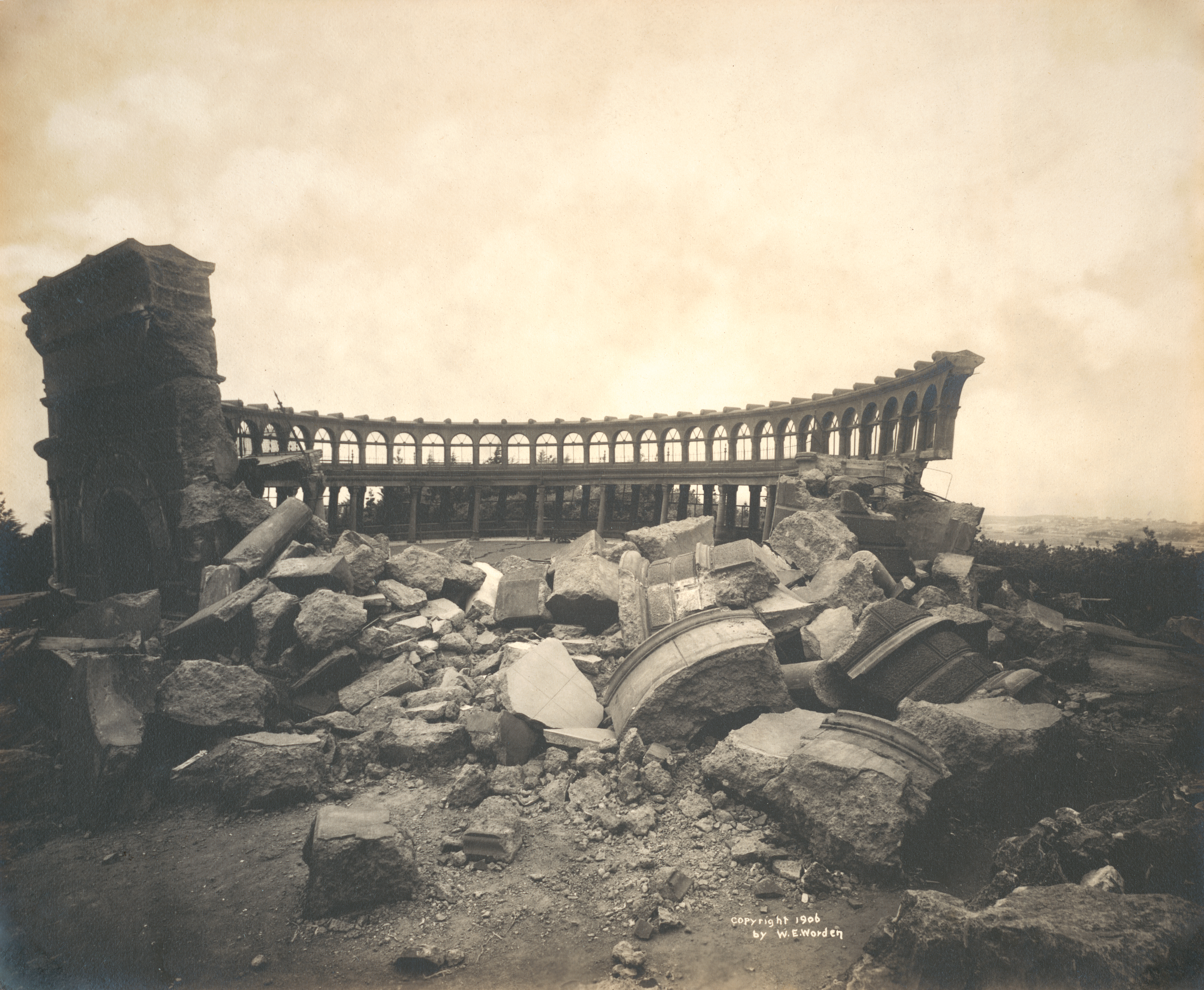
Observatory in ruins

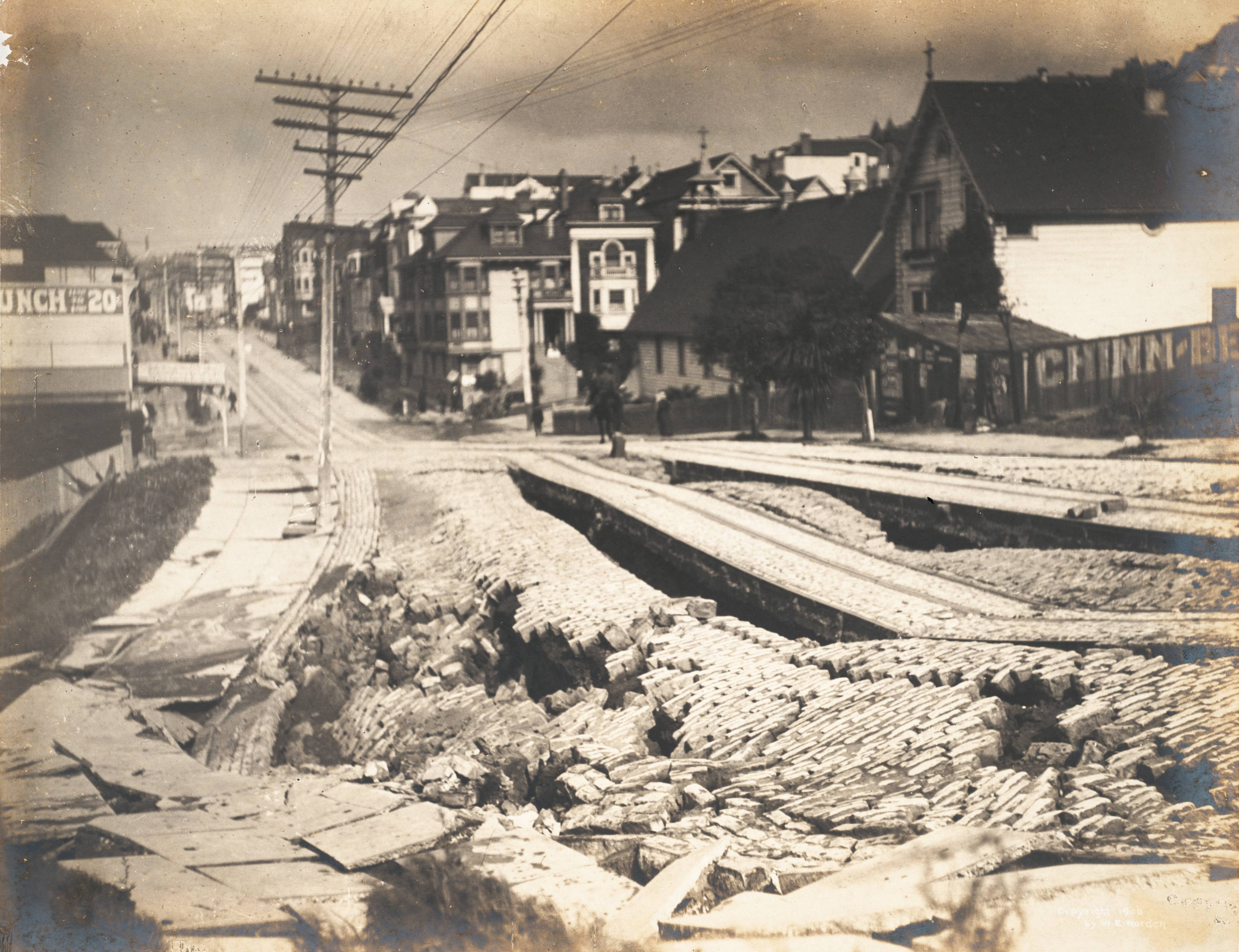
Union Street

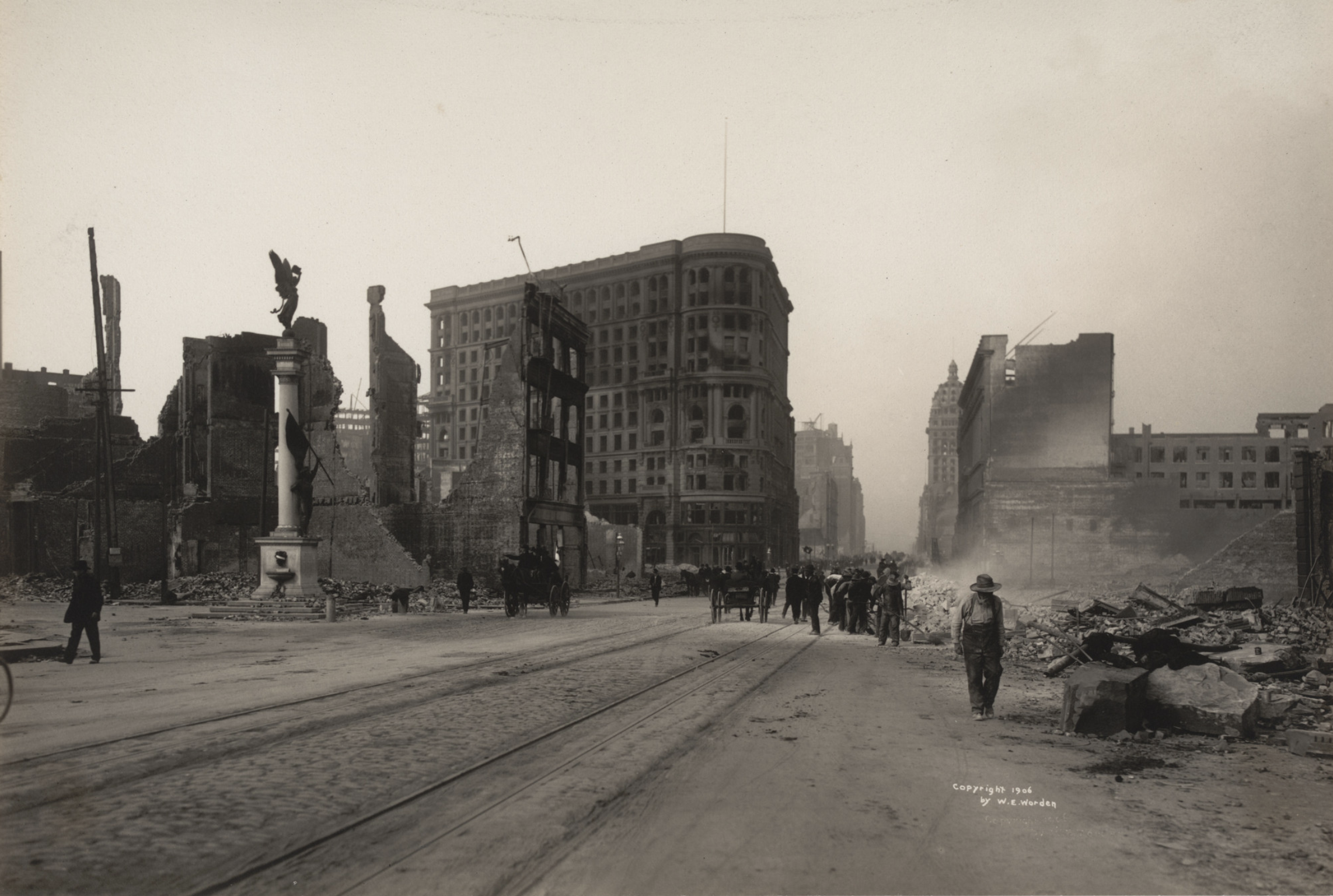
Market Street

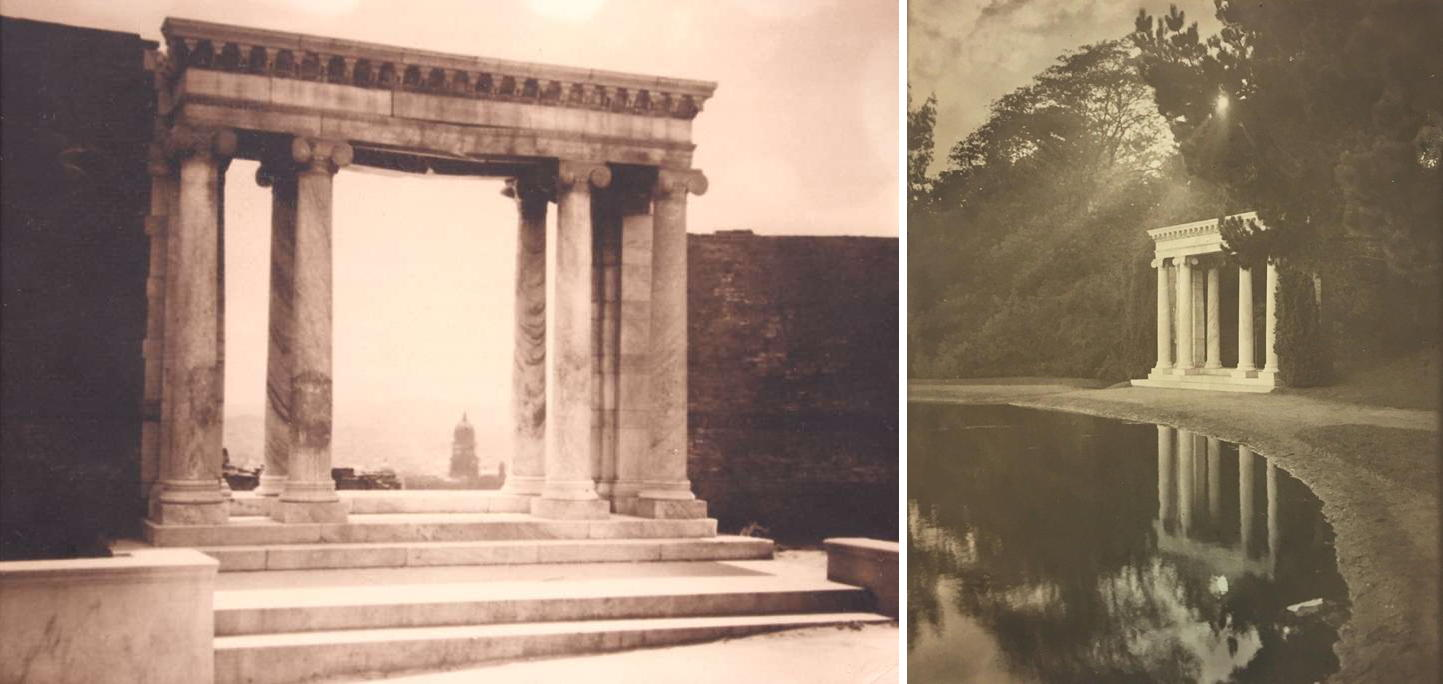
Portals of the Past: Portals of the Past, original location and after being moved to Golden Gate Park

== Panoramas ==
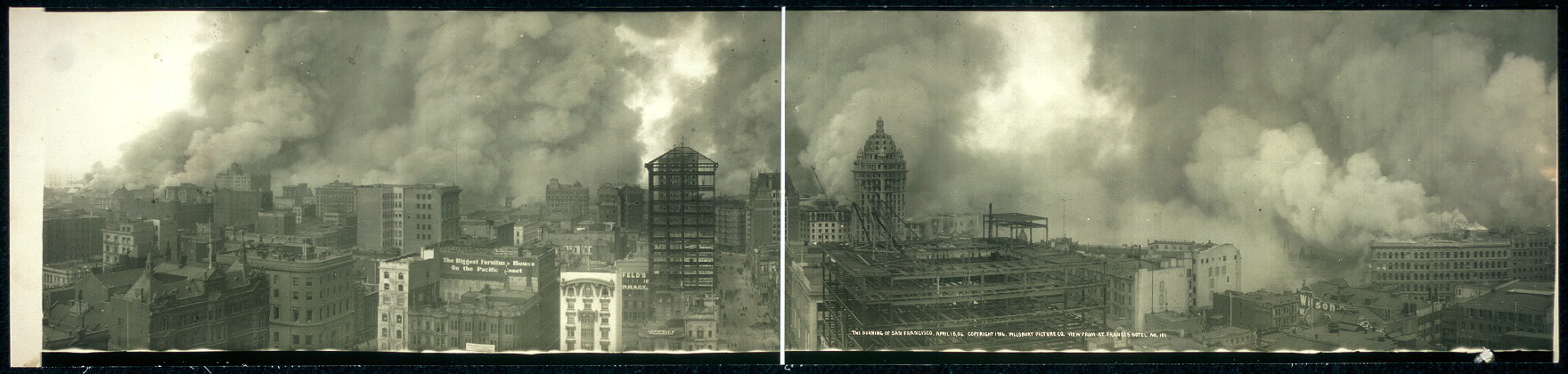
San Francisco burning, view from St. Francis Hotel, at Union Square. Copyright, Pillsbury Pictures, 18 April 1906. Geary Street is in center, terminating at Market Street. The San Francisco Call's domed Call Building, is right-center, at Newspaper Row. Its wood interior burned, but its steel, concrete and stone frame survived.
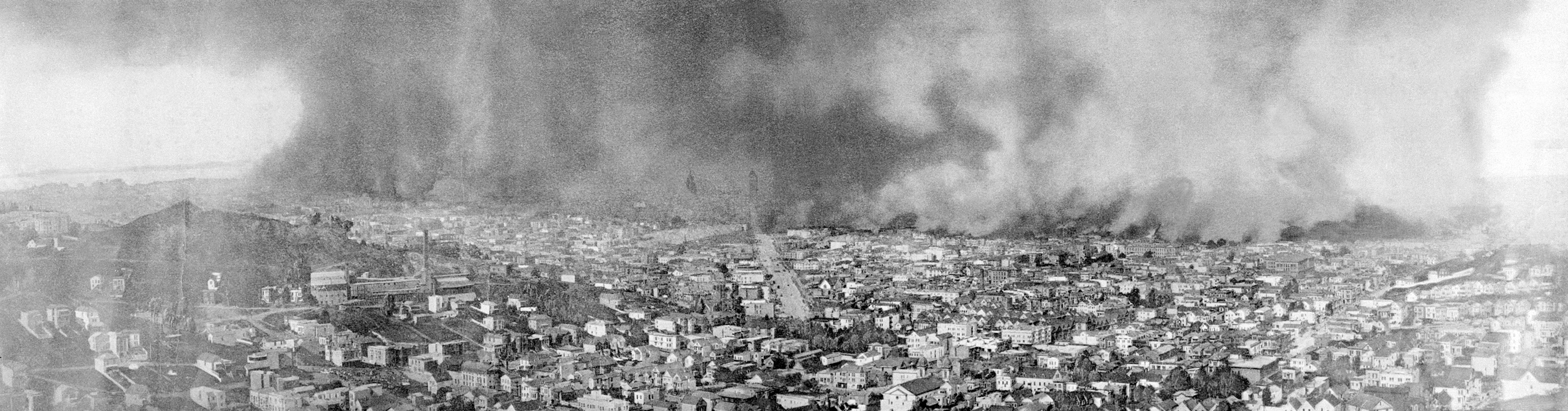
San Francisco, from Twin Peaks, looking down at Eureka Valley, with Market Street, center foreground leading towards the now-previous City Hall dome ruins on left, and The San Francisco Call's domed Call Building on right, center background c. April 18–21, 1906
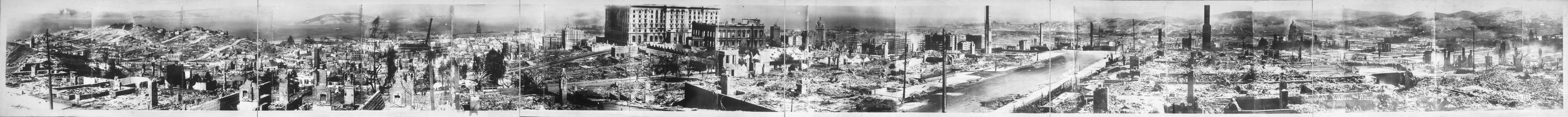
San Francisco 160-degree panorama, from Nob Hill, showing Telegraph Hill, Yerba Buena Island, Ferry Building tower, Fairmont Hotel, The San Francisco Call's domed Call Building, Potrero Hill, San Bruno Mountain, Twin Peaks, showing damage. Copyright, Kilborn & Burn, 31 May 1906.
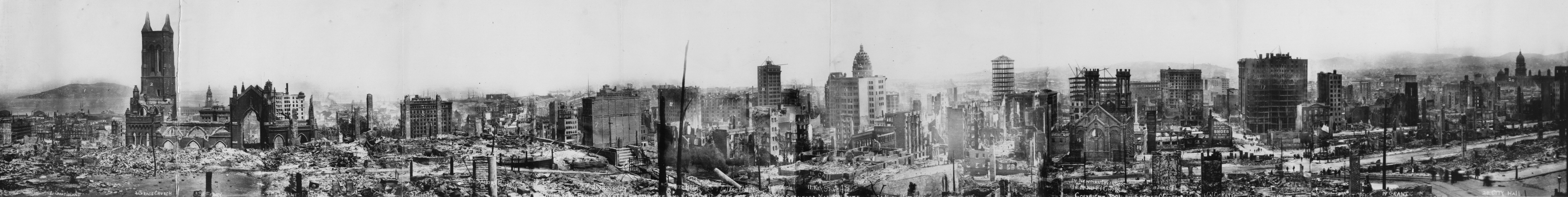
Panoramic view of earthquake and fire damage, looking from Stanford Mansion site, Nob Hill, April 18–21, 1906. Note, from left to right (1) Yerba Buena Island, (2) Grace Cathedral, ...(20) the ruins of the now-previous City Hall dome at far right.
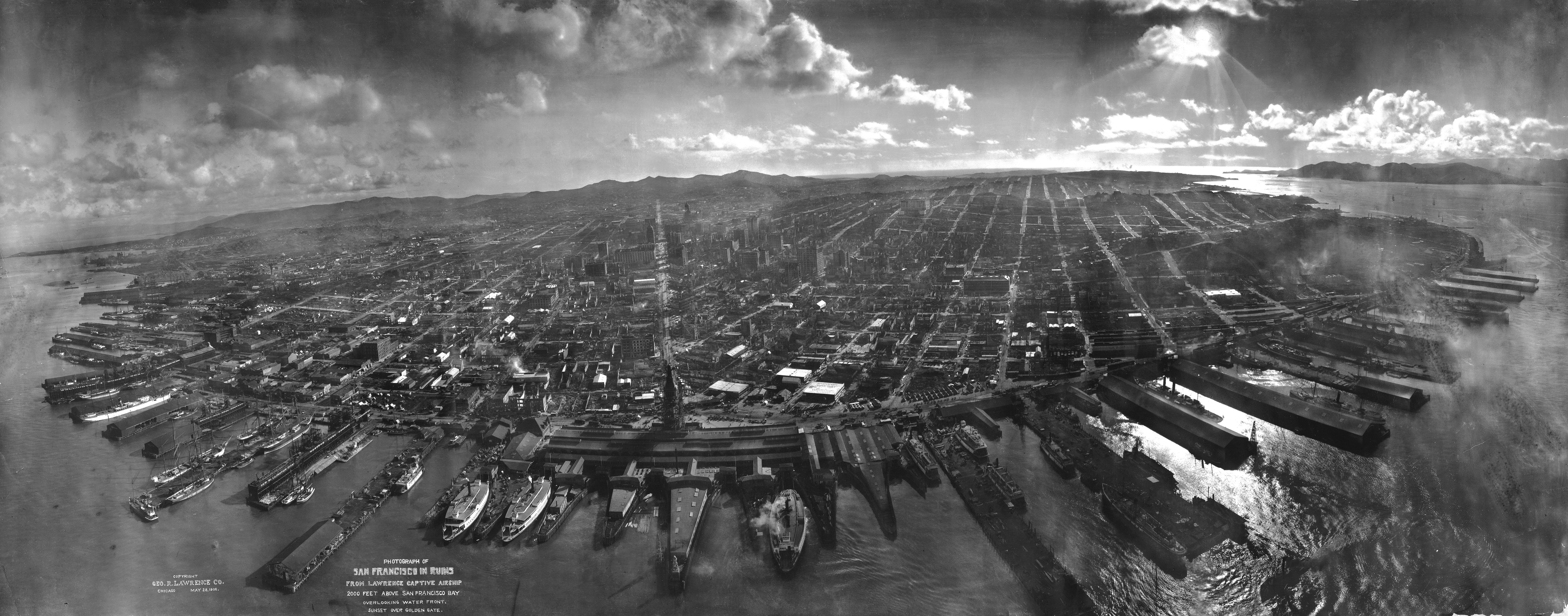
San Francisco in ruins, waterfront in foreground, with sunset over Golden Gate in background, looking from 2,000 feet (610 m) above San Francisco Bay, by George R. Lawrence using kite aerial photography. Copyright May 28, 1906. Market Street leads directly away from Ferry Building tower, center foreground, towards Twin Peaks, center-left background.

== In popular culture ==
- Will Irwin, The City That Was, a series of 1906 articles for The Sun, in New York City, and later as a booklet.
- San Francisco, 1936 disaster movie presenting a fictionalized account, starring Clark Gable.
- The earthquake was the subject of American Experience's episode The Great San Francisco Earthquake, 1906, airing on October 4, 1988. After the 1989 Loma Prieta earthquake, the episode was broadcast on 24 October 1989, featuring a new introduction by host David McCullough.
- The earthquake features in Tony Kushner's 1991 play Angels in America.
- Following the earthquake, San Francisco is rebuilt and later renamed San Fransokyo in Disney's 2014 animated film Big Hero 6.
- In her 2024 novel The Phoenix Crown, Kate Quinn weaves together the stories of women who survive the quake, including botanist Alice Eastwood. Caruso is also figured.
- The earthquake is the setting for Earthquake in the Early Morning, a 2001 book in the children’s series Magic Tree House by Mary Pope Osbourne.
- The earthquake is a significant event in the 1975 children's historical novel Dragonwings by Laurence Yep.
- Mystery author Rhys Bowen's detective character Molly Murphy is nearly killed by the earthquake in her 2016 novel Time Of Fog And Fire, and spends most of the aftermath trying to reunite with her husband, Police Captain Daniel Sullivan.

== See also ==
- Committee of Fifty (1906)
- Earthquake engineering
- List of disasters in the United States by death toll
- List of earthquakes in 1906
- List of earthquakes in California
- List of earthquakes in the United States
- List of fires
