= San Francisco Earthquake & Fire: April 18, 1906 =

American documentary silent film

The film

San Francisco Earthquake & Fire: April 18, 1906 is an American short black-and-white documentary silent film. The film documents the aftermath of the 1906 San Francisco earthquake. This film is "narrated" with the standard text slides between scenes.

In 2005, the film was selected for preservation in the United States National Film Registry as being deemed "culturally, historically, or aesthetically significant". The Library of Congress Motion Picture, Broadcasting and Recorded Sound Division released the 13-minute film.
