= National Earthquake Hazards Reduction Program =

US government organization

The National Earthquake Hazards Reduction Program (NEHRP) was established in 1977 by the United States Congress as part of the Earthquake Hazards Reduction Act of 1977. The original stated purpose for NEHRP was "to reduce the risks of life and property from future Earthquakes in the United States through the establishment and maintenance of an effective earthquake hazards reduction program." Congress periodically reviews and reauthorizes NEHRP, with the most recent review happening in 2018.

NEHRP supports basic research that expands our knowledge of earthquakes and their impacts.

The four basic earthquake hazard reduction goals of NEHRP have remained the same since its creation:

- Develop effective practices/policies and accelerate their implementation.
- Improve techniques for reducing vulnerabilities of facilities and systems.
- Improve earthquake hazards identification and risk assessment methods and their use.
- Improve the understanding of earthquakes and their effects.

To accomplish these goals, NEHRP developed the Advisory Committee on Earthquake Hazards Reduction to advise congress on the programs progress in relation to:

- Improved design and construction methods and best practices
- Land use controls and redevelopment
- Prediction and early-warning systems
- Coordinated emergency preparedness plans
- Public education/involvement programs

== Primary NEHRP agencies ==
NEHRP has four designated federal agencies that contribute to the program:

- Federal Emergency Management Agency (FEMA) of the United States Department of Homeland Security
- National Institute of Standards and Technology (NIST) of the United States Department of Commerce (NIST is the lead NEHRP agency)
- National Science Foundation (NSF)
- United States Geological Survey (USGS) of the United States Department of the Interior

The majority of NEHRP's research activities are accomplished through the National Science Foundation funding of earthquake-related research in earth sciences, social sciences and engineering. NSF also provides post-earthquake empirical research using reconnaissance teams. These teams visit affected regions documenting the impacts, performance of construction and response/recovery.

FEMA's primary role is to implement and distribute the final research products of NEHRP. This is done through the creation of a variety of published materials made available to 3rd parties.

== Recent research ==
In 2020, NHERP and its partner agencies published "The 2020 NEHRP Recommended Seismic Provisions for New Buildings and Other Structures." The report comprises a summary of a 5 year research project and includes 37 recommended changes to American Society of Civil Engineers/SEI section 7-16 (Minimum Design Loads and Associated Criteria for Buildings and Other Structures), nine white papers and associated commentary.
