= Disaster Relief Act of 1974 =

- Long title: An Act entitled the "Disaster Relief Act Amendments of 1974"
- Acronyms (colloquial): DRAA
- Nicknames: Disaster Relief Act Amendments of 1974
- Enacted by: the 93rd United States Congress
- Effective: April 1, 1974

Citations
- Public law: 93-288
- Statutes at Large: 88 Stat. 143

Codification
- Titles amended: 42 U.S.C.: Public Health and Social Welfare
- U.S.C. sections amended: 42 U.S.C. ch. 68 § 5121 et seq.

Legislative history
- Introduced in the Senate as S. 3062 by Quentin N. Burdick (D–ND) on February 26, 1974; Committee consideration by Senate Public Works; Passed the Senate on April 10, 1974 (91-0); Passed the House on April 11, 1974 (Passed); Reported by the joint conference committee on May 9, 1974; agreed to by the Senate on May 9, 1974 (Agreed) and by the House on May 15, 1974 (392-0); Signed into law by President Richard Nixon on May 22, 1974

The Disaster Relief Act of 1974 (Public Law 93-288) was passed into law by the then President Richard Nixon as a United States federal law that established the process of presidential disaster declarations. The bill was introduced by Senator Quentin Burdick on February 26, 1974. The bill passed 91–0 as amended on April 10, 1974, and the House agreed to the conference report by a vote of 392–0 on May 15, 1974. It was to better handle the array of disasters that occur annually throughout the 50 states. At one point, more than one hundred federal agencies were involved in handling disasters and emergencies. The Act also helped give more fixed relief to disaster survivors.

== Amendments ==
In 1979, President Jimmy Carter consolidated many of them into the new Federal Emergency Management Agency (FEMA) by Executive Order 12127.

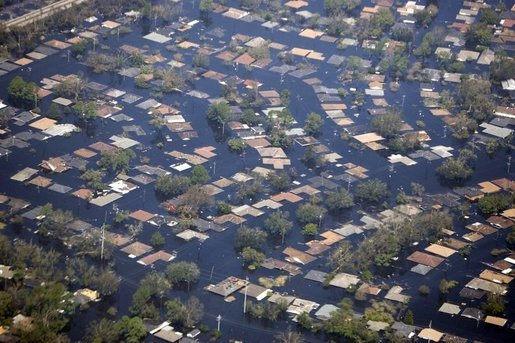
Flooding post Hurricane Katrina

In November 1988, the United States Congress amended the Act and renamed it the Stafford Disaster Relief and Emergency Assistance Act (Public Law 100-707).

This act was further amended by the Disaster Mitigation Act of 2000.
