= Western Reserve Rowing Association =

American rowing club

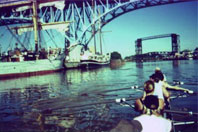
WRRA on the Cuyahoga River.

Western Reserve Rowing Association, also known as WRRA, is based out of Rivergate Park on the Cuyahoga River in Cleveland, Ohio, United States.

WRRA organizes all sweep and sculling for adults in Northeast Ohio. It offers athletes the opportunity to train and race in regattas all over North America through its Competitive Team, and fosters camaraderie, fitness and technique with its Recreational Program. It organizes Summer Rowing League, Learn to Row and the Sculling Program. WRRA currently serves over 500 adult rowers.

WRRA partners with the Cleveland Rowing Foundation to organize the Head of the Cuyahoga every fall.

== See also ==
- Sport rowing
- Rowing exercise
