= Juvenile Delinquency and Youth Offenses Control Act of 1961 =

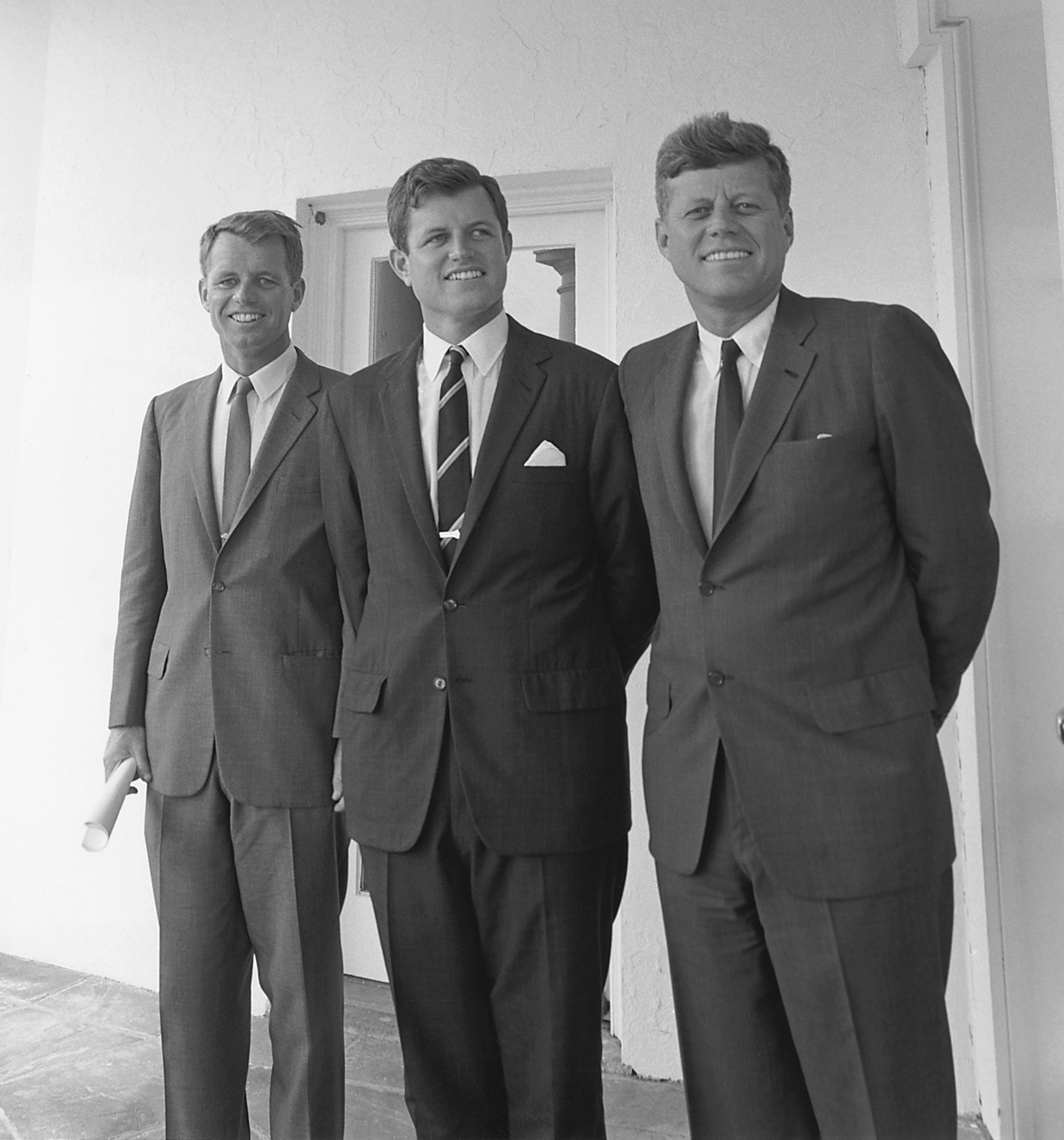
Left to Right: Robert F. Kennedy, Edward M. Kennedy, John F. Kennedy.

The Juvenile Delinquency and Youth Offenses Control Act of 1961 was created by president John F. Kennedy administration's President's Committee on Juvenile Delinquency and Youth Crime, chaired by Attorney General Robert F. Kennedy. The Kennedy administration targeted what they believed to the source of youth crime using the Juvenile Delinquency and Youth Offense Act. Overall "the promise of the Juvenile Delinquency and Youth Offenses Control Act of 1961-to prevent, control, and treat the problem of juvenile delinquency nationally without resorting to punitive reforms,"

== Background information on juvenile delinquency and youth crime ==
=== History of juvenile delinquency and youth crime ===
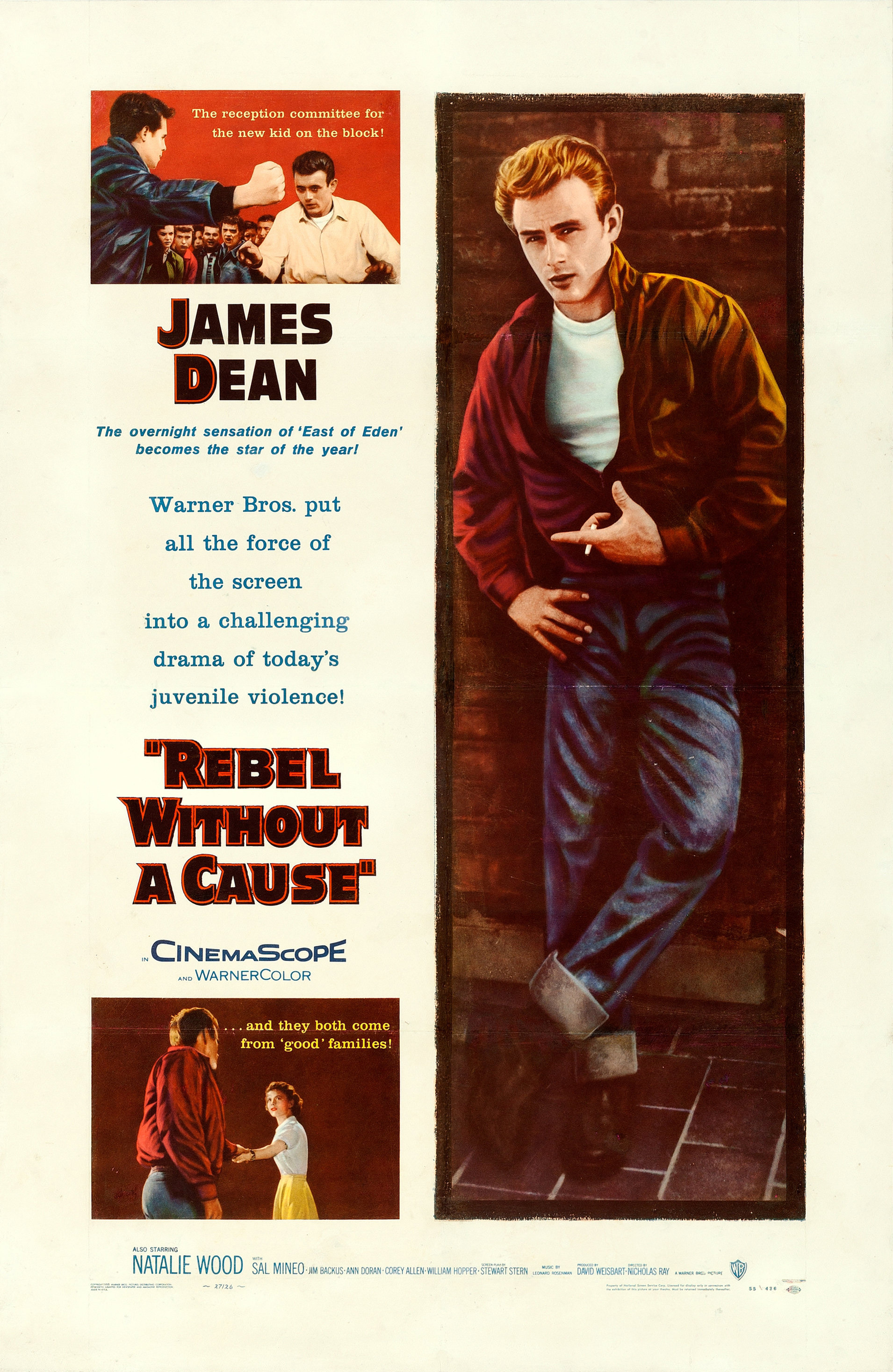
Rebel Without a Case was released in 1955. One of the 60 films about juvenile delinquency throughout the 1950s.

The relationship between youth and crime starts in the 1800s. The first juvenile detention center in the United States was The Society for the Reformation of Juvenile Delinquents in 1825. The system of juvenile law was "really a patchwork of different local, state, and later federal structures," Local, state, and federal laws pertaining to juveniles often were created based on the parens patriae doctrine (which appears almost 140 years later in the Juvenile Delinquency and Youth Offense Act of 1961). In the early 1900s the federal government had not passed much legislation involving juvenile delinquency and youth crime. The Surrender Statute of 1932 and the Juvenile Delinquent Act of 1938 were among the few policies passed in the 1930s.

=== Atmosphere of juvenile delinquency and youth crime in the 1950s ===
During the 1950s the United States federal government noticed increase rates in youth crime. Creating a panic across the United States about youth being involved with crime. The media reflected American anxiety with concerning reports of youth being involved with crime in newspapers and magazines. Hollywood movie studios also took part in the growing concern by making 60 films involving juvenile delinquency.

== Kennedy's crime philosophy ==
John F. Kennedy's philosophy when it came to understanding the causes of increasing rates of juvenile delinquency and youth crime was due to lack of opportunity for juveniles (especially in urban ghetto youth). These lack of opportunities were often due to school dropouts and unemployment. To Kennedy "it was necessary for the federal government to play a part incorporating millions of economically deprived youths into the economic system,"

== Juvenile Delinquency and Youth Offense Act of 1961 ==
=== Timeline ===
On January 9, 1961, the Juvenile Delinquency and Youth Offense Act was introduced in the Senate. About three months later on April 12, the act was passed by the Senate. The act then went onto the House of Representatives and on August 30 the act was passed by the House. On September 22, the Juvenile Delinquency and Youth Offense Act of 1961 was signed into law.

=== Purpose and goal ===
The purpose of the Juvenile Delinquency and Youth Offense Act was "to address the problems of "youth unemployment, poor housing, poor health, inadequate education, and the alienation of the lower-class communities and neighborhoods," these factors were thought to be the foundational reasons behind the rising juvenile crime rates according to the Kennedy administration. The act "sought to confront juvenile crime with planning, programing, and training projects," and had "appropriated a total of $10,000,000 in grant funding,"

== Grant given to the University of North Carolina at Chapel Hill ==
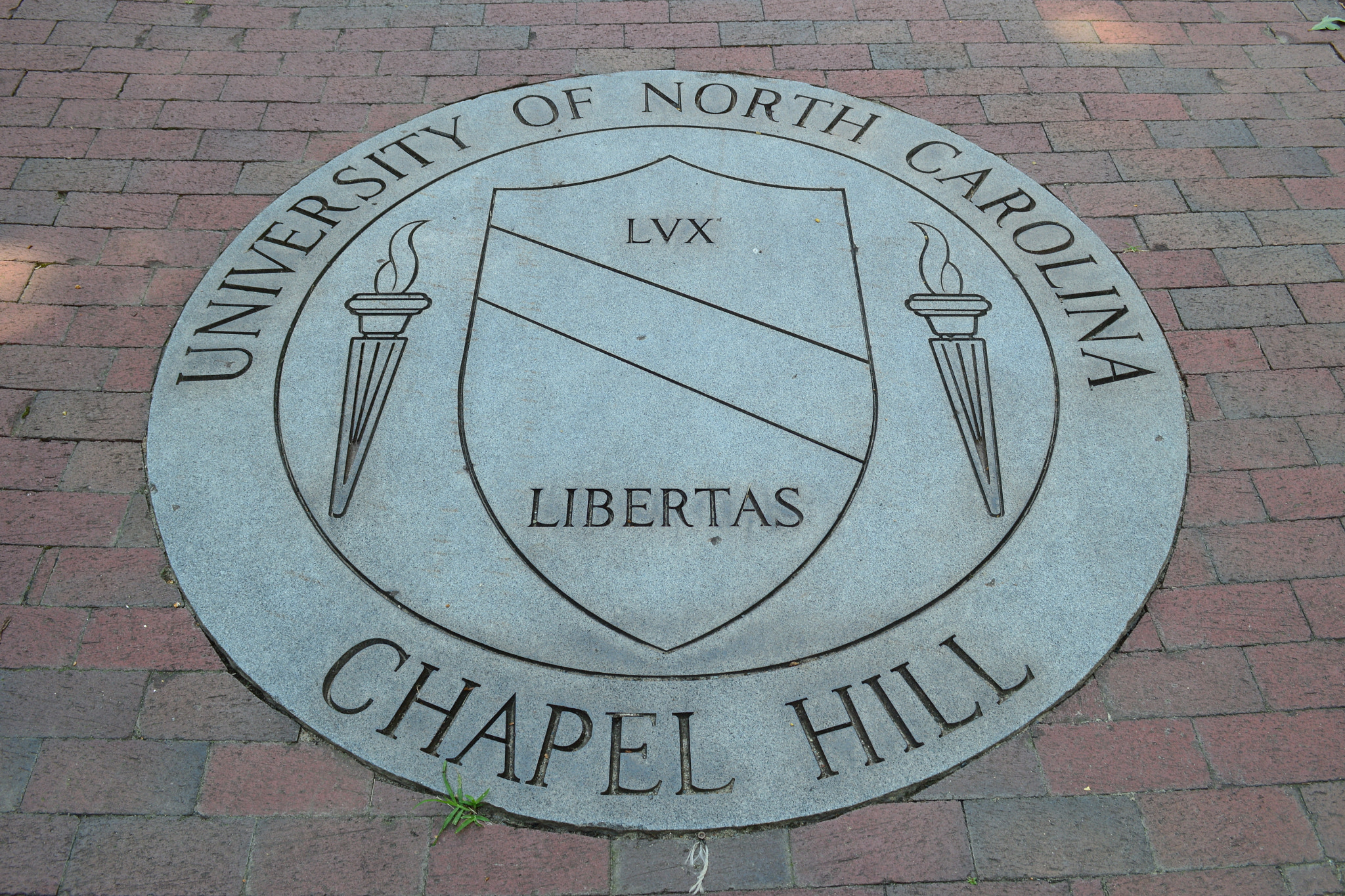

In July 1962 a grant of $153,744 was given to The University of North Carolina at Chapel Hill by The Juvenile Delinquency and Youth Offense Act. The grant was given to the university to establish The Training Center on Delinquency and Youth Crime. Under the Training Center, The Chapel Hill Youth Development and Research Unit (CHYDARU) was established.

=== Training Center on Delinquency and Youth Crime ===
The Training Center on Delinquency and Youth Crime ran from 1962 to 1965. The Training Center's goal was "to standardize and improve juvenile justice across the state of North Carolina by offering courses to those involved in the state's landscape for juvenile justice," Leading to the Training Center becoming the one main places "for training and action research for juvenile justice officials across North Carolina,"

=== Chapel Hill Youth Development and Research Unit (CHYDRU) ===
Established by The Training Center on Delinquency and Youth Crime, "The Chapel Hill Youth Development and Research Unit-was a more direct attempt to "experiment" with state juvenile justice policy," In 1964 it was reported that the "CHYDRU represents the fullest expression of the Training Center's collaborative experiments with the theory and practice of juvenile justice and its sole attempt to enact new forms of rehabilitation for young offenders," The CHYDRU was considered to be a 'highly experimental project' only lasting for about a year from 1964 to 1965.

== Juvenile Delinquency and Youth Offense Act of 1961 lives on ==
The 2018 Juvenile Justice Reform Act shows a resemblance to the Juvenile Delinquency and Youth Offense Act of 1961. The two acts have very similar policies on the structure and authorization of grants. The grants from the 2018 Juvenile Justice Reform Act were meant "for the development of more effective education, training, research, prevention, diversion, treatment, and rehabilitation programs in the area of juvenile delinquency," Supporting the factors that the Kennedy administration thought were foundational reasons behind juvenile delinquency and youth crime.
