= Advisory Committee on Earthquake Hazards Reduction =

US agency

The 2004 re-authorization of National Earthquake Hazards Reduction Program (NEHRP) directed that the Director of the U.S. National Institute of Standards and Technology (NIST) establish the Advisory Committee on Earthquake Hazards Reduction (ACEHR) to assess:

- trends and developments in the science and engineering of earthquake hazards reduction;
- the effectiveness of NEHRP in performing its statutory activities:
  - improved design and construction methods and practices;
  - land use controls and redevelopment;
  - prediction techniques and early-warning systems;
  - coordinated emergency preparedness plans; and
  - public education and involvement programs;
- any need to revise NEHRP; and
- the management, coordination, implementation, and activities of the NEHRP.

On June 27, 2006, the official Charter of the Advisory Committee on Earthquake Hazards Reduction was established by the U.S. Department of Commerce, parent agency for NIST. The committee is to be widely representative of the stakeholder community. Federal employees may not serve on the committee. As established by the charter, ACEHR will have 11–15 voting members, in addition to having the Chairperson of the United States Geological Survey (USGS) Scientific Earthquake Studies Advisory Committee (SESAC) serve in an ex-officio capacity.
