= Water Resources Research Act =

Water Resources Research Act of 1964
- Enacted by: the 88th United States Congress
- Effective: July 17, 1964

Citations
- Public law: 88-379

Legislative history
- Introduced in the Senate as S.2; Signed into law by President Lyndon B. Johnson on {{{signeddate}}}

The Water Resources Research Act of 1964 (WRRA) established a legal framework for water resource research in the United States and Puerto Rico.

It undertook "... a coordinated scientific research program in water...", which constitutes "... the greatest resource problem facing the West and the Nation ..." The WRRA's principal result was establishment of the National Institutes for Water Resources.

== Distinctions ==
One of the earliest research grants of the WRRA went to eventual Nobel Memorial Prize-laureate Elinor Ostrom at the beginning of her career.
