= List of Colorado School of Mines people =

List of some notable people associated with the Colorado School of Mines

Coordinates: 39.7511°N 105.2224°W

Location of Colorado School of Mines in Colorado

This is a list of some notable people associated with the Colorado School of Mines, located in Golden, Colorado, United States.

== Notable alumni ==
- Arthur S. Adams, academic, former president of the University of New Hampshire
- Tesho Akindele, Canadian soccer player, 2014 MLS Rookie of the Year
- John P. Allen, systems ecologist, engineer, metallurgist, adventurer, and writer
- William Arbegast, metallurgical engineer, mechanical engineer and friction stir welding expert
- Souad Naji Al-Azzawi, Iraqi environmentalist and academic researcher, first Arab to receive the Nuclear-Free Future Award
- Charles Arthur Banks, 17th lieutenant governor of British Columbia
- Arden L. Bement, Jr., former director of the National Science Foundation
- Fred Chester Bond, mining engineer, developed the Bond Work Index
- George R. Brown, entrepreneur
- Shane Carwin (mechanical engineering), wrestler; former mixed martial artist who won the UFC Interim Heavyweight Championship
- Sabré Cook, engineer and racing driver competing in the W Series
- Antônio Ermírio de Moraes, Brazilian businessman, chairman of the Votorantim Group, and ranked one of the richest men in Brazil by Forbes magazine
- Kenneth S. Deffeyes, geologist who worked with M. King Hubbert, the creator of the Hubbert peak theory, at the Shell Oil Company research laboratory
- James H. Dickinson, commander of the United States Space Command
- Wendell Fertig, civil engineer and World War II hero
- Jeffrey Goodman, independent archaeologist
- Gerald Grandey, former resident and chief executive officer of Cameco Corporation
- Jack J. Grynberg, Polish-born American businessman
- Vance Haynes, archaeologist, geologist and author who specializes in the archaeology of the American Southwest
- Judson Dean Howard, speleologist known for helping establish Lava Beds National Monument in California
- Derrick Jensen, author, Deep Green Resistance, mineral engineering physics
- Marty Jertson, golf club designer who made the cut in the 2019 PGA Championship
- William M. Ketchum, U.S. representative from California
- Howard W. Leaf, United States Air Force lieutenant general, assistant vice chief of staff at the Pentagon
- Fred Meissner, geologist and engineer
- Jan D. Miller, metallurgical engineer and member of the National Academy of Engineering
- Steven L. Newman, businessman, former chief executive of Transocean
- Erol Ozensoy, Turkish entrepreneur, industrialist and businessmen, who founded Kimetsan
- Bryce Poe II, United States Air Force four-star general who served as commander of the Air Force Logistics Command 1978–1981
- Fitch Robertson, former mayor of Berkeley, California (1943–1947)
- Roger Rueff, dramatist, BSc 1978, MSc '83 and PhD '85 in chemical and petroleum refining engineering
- George Saunders, writer, journalist and professor, winner of the Man Booker Prize for Lincoln in the Bardo, BSc 1981 in geophysical engineering
- Marc Schiechl, NFL Jacksonville Jaguars, AFL LA Kiss
- August Schomburg, former commander of the United States Army Ballistic Missile Command
- Craig Schurig, football coach and former player
- Sao Kya Seng, politician, mining engineer, agriculturalist and the last Saopha of Hsipaw State, Myanmar, 1947–1959
- Frank Shakespeare, diplomat and media executive, former president of CBS Television, United States ambassador to Portugal (1985–1986) and United States ambassador to the Holy See (1986-1989)
- Cleave Simpson, Colorado state senator from Alamosa, Colorado
- Kat Steele, University of Washington professor
- Robert H. Waterman Jr., co-author of In Search of Excellence, geophysical engineer 1958, medalist '84
- Joseph Robert Wright Jr., businessman, 27th director of the Office of Management and Budget
- Purnomo Yusgiantoro, 25th Minister of Defense of Indonesia

== Notable faculty ==
- Alexander A. Kaufman, emeritus professor of geophysics and scientist

== See also ==
- Colorado School of Mines
- List of colleges and universities in Colorado
- Bibliography of Colorado
- Geography of Colorado
- History of Colorado
- Index of Colorado-related articles
- List of Colorado-related lists
- Outline of Colorado
