= Geophysical survey =

Systematic collection of geophysical data for spatial studies

Geophysical survey is the systematic collection of geophysical data for spatial studies. Detection and analysis of the geophysical signals forms the core of Geophysical signal processing. The magnetic and gravitational fields emanating from the Earth's interior hold essential information concerning seismic activities and the internal structure. Hence, detection and analysis of the electric and Magnetic fields is very crucial. As the Electromagnetic and gravitational waves are multi-dimensional signals, all the 1-D transformation techniques can be extended for the analysis of these signals as well. Hence this article also discusses multi-dimensional signal processing techniques.

Geophysical surveys can involve a wide range of sensing instruments, with data collected from above or below the Earth’s surface, or from platforms such as aircraft, satellites, or ships. Geophysical surveys have many applications in geology, archaeology, mineral and energy exploration, oceanography, and engineering. Geophysical surveys are used in industry as well as for academic research.

The sensing instruments such as gravimeter, gravitational wave sensor and magnetometers detect fluctuations in the gravitational and magnetic field. The data collected from a geophysical survey is analysed to draw meaningful conclusions out of that. Analysing the spectral density and the time-frequency localisation of any signal is important in applications such as oil exploration and seismography.

== Types of geophysical survey ==
There are many methods and types of instruments used in geophysical surveys. Technologies used for geophysical surveys include:

1. Seismic methods, such as reflection seismology, seismic refraction, and seismic tomography. This type of survey is carried out to discover the detailed structure of the rock formations beneath the surface of the Earth.
2. Seismoelectrical method
3. Geodesy and gravity techniques, including gravimetry and gravity gradiometry. This type of survey is carried out to measure small variations in the Earth's gravitational field caused by density differences between subsurface rocks, which are then used to infer the structure of rock formations beneath the surface of the Earth.
4. Magnetic techniques, including aeromagnetic surveys and magnetometers.
5. Electrical techniques, including electrical resistivity tomography, induced polarization, spontaneous potential and marine control source electromagnetic (mCSEM) or EM seabed logging. This type of survey is carried out mainly to study the existence of groundwater.
6. Electromagnetic methods, such as magnetotellurics, ground penetrating radar and transient/time-domain electromagnetics, surface nuclear magnetic resonance (also known as magnetic resonance sounding).
7. Borehole geophysics, also called well logging.
8. Remote sensing techniques, including hyperspectral.

== Geophysical signal detection ==
This section deals with the principles behind measurement of geophysical waves. The magnetic and gravitational fields are important components of geophysical signals.

The instrument used to measure the change in gravitational field is the gravimeter. This meter measures the variation in the gravity due to the subsurface formations and deposits. To measure the changes in magnetic field the magnetometer is used. There are two types of magnetometers, one that measures only vertical component of the magnetic field and the other measures total magnetic field.

With the help of these meters, either the gravity values at different locations are measured or the values of Earth's magnetic field are measured. Then these measured values are corrected for various corrections and an anomaly map is prepared. By analyzing these anomaly maps one can get an idea about the structure of rock formations in that area. For this purpose one need to use various analog or digital filters.

=== Measurement of Earth's magnetic fields ===
Magnetometers are used to measure the magnetic fields, magnetic anomalies in the earth. The sensitivity of magnetometers depends upon the requirement. For example, the variations in the geomagnetic fields can be to the order of several aT where 1aT = 10^{−18}T . In such cases, specialized magnetometers such as the superconducting quantum interference device (SQUID) are used.

Jim Zimmerman co-developed the rf superconducting quantum interference device (SQUID) during his tenure at Ford research lab. However, events leading to the invention of the SQUID were in fact, serendipitous. John Lambe, during his experiments on nuclear magnetic resonance noticed that the electrical properties of indium varied due to a change in the magnetic field of the order of few nT. However, Lambe was not able to fully recognize the utility of SQUID.

SQUIDs have the capability to detect magnetic fields of extremely low magnitude. This is due to the virtue of the Josephson junction. Jim Zimmerman pioneered the development of SQUID by proposing a new approach to making the Josephson junctions. He made use of niobium wires and niobium ribbons to form two Josephson junctions connected in parallel. The ribbons act as the interruptions to the superconducting current flowing through the wires. The junctions are very sensitive to the magnetic fields and hence are very useful in measuring fields of the order of 10^{^-18}T.

=== Seismic wave measurement using gravitational wave sensor ===
Gravitational wave sensors can detect even a minute change in the gravitational fields due to the influence of heavier bodies. Large seismic waves can interfere with the gravitational waves and may cause shifts in the atoms. Hence, the magnitude of seismic waves can be detected by a relative shift in the gravitational waves.

=== Measurement of seismic waves using atom interferometer ===
The motion of any mass is affected by the gravitational field. The motion of planets is affected by the Sun's enormous gravitational field. Likewise, a heavier object will influence the motion of other objects of smaller mass in its vicinity. However, this change in the motion is very small compared to the motion of heavenly bodies. Hence, special instruments are required to measure such a minute change.

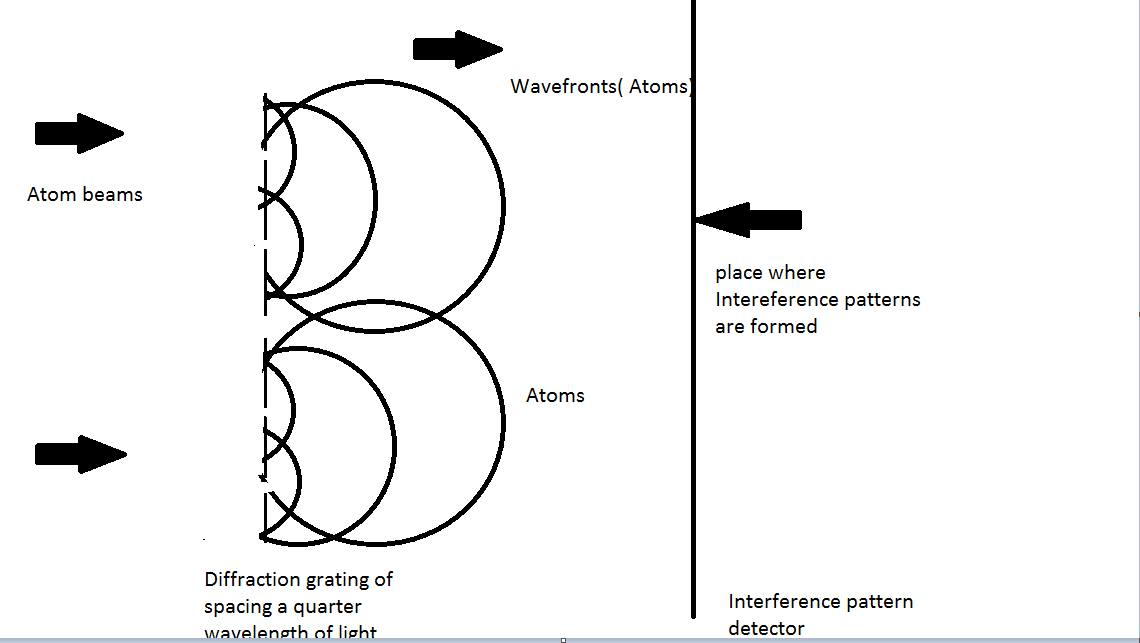
Describes the atom interferometer principle

Atom interferometers work on the principle of diffraction. The diffraction gratings are nano fabricated materials with a separation of a quarter wavelength of light. When a beam of atoms pass through a diffraction grating, due to the inherent wave nature of atoms, they split and form interference fringes on the screen. An atom interferometer is very sensitive to the changes in the positions of atoms. As heavier objects shifts the position of the atoms nearby, displacement of the atoms can be measured by detecting a shift in the interference fringes.

== Existing approaches in geophysical signal recognition ==
This section addresses the methods and mathematical techniques behind signal recognition and signal analysis. It considers the time domain and frequency domain analysis of signals. This section also discusses various transforms and their usefulness in the analysis of multi-dimensional waves.

=== 3D sampling ===
==== Sampling ====
The first step in any signal processing approach is analog to digital conversion. The geophysical signals in the analog domain has to be converted to digital domain for further processing. Most of the filters are available in 1D as well as 2D.

==== Analog to digital conversion ====
As the name suggests, the gravitational and electromagnetic waves in the analog domain are detected, sampled and stored for further analysis. The signals can be sampled in both time and frequency domains. The signal component is measured at both intervals of time and space. Ex, time-domain sampling refers to measuring a signal component at several instances of time. Similarly, spatial-sampling refers to measuring the signal at different locations in space.

Traditional sampling of 1D time varying signals is performed by measuring the amplitude of the signal under consideration in discrete intervals of time. Similarly sampling of space-time signals (signals which are functions of 4 variables – 3D space and time), is performed by measuring the amplitude of the signals at different time instances and different locations in the space. For example, the Earth's gravitational data is measured with the help of gravitational wave sensor or gradiometer by placing it in different locations at different instances of time.

=== Spectrum analysis ===
==== Multi-dimensional Fourier transform ====
The Fourier expansion of a time domain signal is the representation of the signal as a sum of its frequency components, specifically sum of sines and cosines. Joseph Fourier came up with the Fourier representation to estimate the heat distribution of a body. The same approach can be followed to analyse the multi-dimensional signals such as gravitational waves and electromagnetic waves.

The 4D Fourier representation of such signals is given by

$$S (K, \omega) = \iint s(x,t) e^{-j (\omega t - k' x)} \, dx\, dt$$

- ω represents temporal frequency and k represents spatial frequency.
- s(x,t) is a 4-dimensional space-time signal which can be imagined as travelling plane waves. For such plane waves, the plane of propagation is perpendicular to the direction of propagation of the considered wave.

==== Wavelet transform ====
The motivation for development of the Wavelet transform was the Short-time Fourier transform. The signal to be analysed, say f(t) is multiplied with a window function w(t) at a particular time instant. Analysing the Fourier coefficients of this signal gives us information about the frequency components of the signal at a particular time instant.

The STFT is mathematically written as:

$$\{x(t)\}(\tau,\omega) \equiv X(\tau, \omega) = \int_{-\infty}^{\infty} x(t) w(t-\tau) e^{-j \omega t} \, dt$$

The Wavelet transform is defined as

$$X(a,b) = \frac{1}{\sqrt{a}} \int\limits_\ \Psi( \frac{t-b}{a}) x(t) dt$$

A variety of window functions can be used for analysis. Wavelet functions are used for both time and frequency localisation. For example, one of the windows used in calculating the Fourier coefficients is the Gaussian window which is optimally concentrated in time and frequency. This optimal nature can be explained by considering the time scaling and time shifting parameters a and b respectively. By choosing the appropriate values of a and b, we can determine the frequencies and the time associated with that signal. By representing any signal as the linear combination of the wavelet functions, we can localize the signals in both time and frequency domain. Hence wavelet transforms are important in geophysical applications where spatial and temporal frequency localisation is important.

Time frequency localisation using wavelets

Geophysical signals are continuously varying functions of space and time. The wavelet transform techniques offer a way to decompose the signals as a linear combination of shifted and scaled version of basis functions. The amount of "shift" and "scale" can be modified to localize the signal in time and frequency.

==== Beamforming ====
Simply put, space-time signal filtering problem can be thought as localizing the speed and direction of a particular signal. The design of filters for space-time signals follows a similar approach as that of 1D signals. The filters for 1-D signals are designed in such a way that if the requirement of the filter is to extract frequency components in a particular non-zero range of frequencies, a bandpass filter with appropriate passband and stop band frequencies in determined. Similarly, in the case of multi-dimensional systems, the wavenumber-frequency response of filters is designed in such a way that it is unity in the designed region of (k, ω) a.k.a. wavenumber – frequency and zero elsewhere.

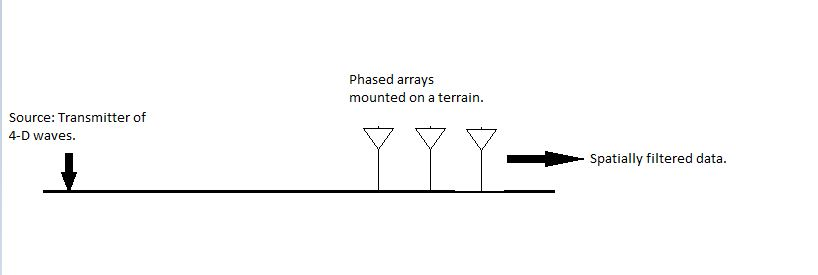
Spatial distribution of phased arrays to filter geophysical signals

This approach is applied for filtering space-time signals. It is designed to isolate signals travelling in a particular direction. One of the simplest filters is weighted delay and sum beamformer. The output is the average of the linear combination of delayed signals. In other words, the beamformer output is formed by averaging weighted and delayed versions of receiver signals. The delay is chosen such that the passband of beamformer is directed to a specific direction in the space.

=== Classical estimation theory ===
This section deals with the estimation of the power spectral density of the multi-dimensional signals. The spectral density function can be defined as a multidimensional Fourier transform of the autocorrelation function of the random signal.

$$P\left (K_x,w\right)=\int_{-\infty}^\infty \int_{-\infty}^\infty \varphi_{ss}\left(x,t\right)\ e^{-j\left(w t-k' x\right)}\,dx\,dt$$

$$\varphi_{ss}\left(x,t\right)=s\left[\left(\xi,\tau\right)s*\left(\xi-x,\tau-t\right)\right]$$

The spectral estimates can be obtained by finding the square of the magnitude of the Fourier transform also called as Periodogram. The spectral estimates obtained from the periodogram have a large variance in amplitude for consecutive periodogram samples or in wavenumber. This problem is resolved using techniques that constitute the classical estimation theory. They are as follows:

1.Bartlett suggested a method that averages the spectral estimates to calculate the power spectrum. Average of spectral estimates over a time interval gives a better estimate.

$P_B\left(w\right) = \frac{1}{\mathrm{det}\,N}\sum_{l}|\sum_{n}\ x\left(n+MI\right)\ e^{-j\left(w' n\right)}|^2$ Bartlett's case

2.Welch's method suggested to divide the measurements using data window functions, calculate a periodogram, average them to get a spectral estimate and calculate the power spectrum using Fast Fourier Transform. This increased the computational speed.

$P_W\left(w\right) = \frac{1}{\mathrm{det}\,N}\sum_{l}|\sum_{n}\ g\left(n\right)\ x\left(n+MI\right)\ e^{-j\left(w' n\right)}|^2$ Welch's case

4. The periodogram under consideration can be modified by multiplying it with a window function. Smoothing window will help us smoothen the estimate. Wider the main lobe of the smoothing spectrum, smoother it becomes at the cost of frequency resolution.

$P_M\left(w\right) = \frac{1}{detN}|\sum_{n}\ g\left(n\right)\ x\left(n\right)\ e^{-j\left(w' n\right)}|^2$ Modified periodogram

For further details on spectral estimation, please refer Spectral Analysis of Multi-dimensional signals

== Applications ==
=== Estimating positions of underground objects ===
The method being discussed here assumes that the mass distribution of the underground objects of interest is already known and hence the problem of estimating their location boils down to parametric localisation. Say underground objects with center of masses (CM_{1}, CM_{2}...CM_{n}) are located under the surface and at positions p_{1}, p_{2}...p_{n}. The gravity gradient (components of the gravity field) is measured using a spinning wheel with accelerometers also called as the gravity gradiometer. The instrument is positioned in different orientations to measure the respective component of the gravitational field. The values of gravitational gradient tensors are calculated and analyzed. The analysis includes observing the contribution of each object under consideration. A maximum likelihood procedure is followed and Cramér–Rao bound (CRB) is computed to assess the quality of location estimate.

=== Array processing for seismographic applications ===
Various sensors located on the surface of Earth spaced equidistantly receive the seismic waves. The seismic waves travel through the various layers of earth and undergo changes in their properties - amplitude change, time of arrival, phase shift. By analyzing these properties of the signals, we can model the activities inside the Earth.

=== Visualization of 3D data ===
The method of volume rendering is an important tool to analyse the scalar fields. Volume rendering simplifies representation of 3D space. Every point in a 3D space is called a voxel. Data inside the 3-d dataset is projected to the 2-d space (display screen) using various techniques. Different data encoding schemes exist for various applications such as MRI, Seismic applications.
