= Telluric current =

Natural electric current in the Earth's crust

A telluric current (from Latin tellūs 'earth'), or Earth current, is an electric current that flows underground or through the sea, resulting from natural and human-induced causes. These currents have extremely low frequency and traverse large areas near or at Earth's surface. Earth's crust and mantle are host to telluric currents, with around 32 mechanisms generating them, primarily geomagnetically induced currents caused by changes in Earth's magnetic field due to solar wind interactions with the magnetosphere or solar radiation's effects on the ionosphere. These currents exhibit diurnal patterns, flowing towards the Sun during the day and towards the geomagnetic poles at night.

Both telluric and magnetotelluric methods exploit these currents for subsurface exploration, aiding in activities like geothermal and mineral exploration, petroleum prospecting, fault zone mapping, groundwater assessment, and the study of tectonic plate boundaries. The phenomenon has also captured the imagination of authors, finding its way into fiction. In Umberto Eco's Foucault's Pendulum, the search for a mystic center of the Earth connects to telluric currents, while Thomas Pynchon's Mason & Dixon incorporates them as enigmatic communication conduits alongside Hollow Earth theories.

== Description ==
Telluric currents are phenomena observed in the Earth's crust and mantle. In September 1862, an experiment to specifically address Earth currents was carried out in the Munich Alps (Lamont, 1862). Including minor processes, there are at least 32 different mechanisms which cause telluric currents. The strongest are primarily geomagnetically induced currents, which are induced by changes in the outer part of the Earth's magnetic field, which are usually caused by interactions between the solar wind and the magnetosphere or solar radiation effects on the ionosphere. Telluric currents flow in the surface layers of the Earth. The electric potential on the Earth's surface can be measured at different points, enabling the calculation of the magnitudes and directions of the telluric currents and hence the Earth's conductance. These currents are known to have diurnal characteristics wherein the general direction of flow is towards the Sun. Telluric currents continuously move between the sunlit and shadowed sides of the Earth, toward the equator on the side of the Earth facing the Sun (that is, during the day), and toward the poles on the night side of the planet.

Both telluric and magnetotelluric methods are used for exploring the structure beneath the Earth's surface (such as in industrial prospecting). For mineral exploration the targets are any subsurface structures with a distinguishable resistance in comparison to its surroundings. Uses include geothermal exploration, mining exploration, petroleum exploration, mapping of fault zones, ground water exploration and monitoring, investigation of magma chambers, and investigation of boundaries of tectonic plates. Earth batteries tap a useful low voltage current from telluric currents and were used for telegraph systems as far back as the 1840s.

In industrial prospecting activity that uses the telluric current method, electrodes are properly located on the ground to sense the voltage difference between locations caused by the oscillatory telluric currents. It is recognized that a low frequency window (LFW) exists when telluric currents pass through the Earth's substrata. In the frequencies of the LFW, the Earth acts as a conductor.

== In fiction ==
The main plot of the 1988 novel Foucault's Pendulum by Umberto Eco revolves around conspiracy theorists who believe that they are searching for the Umbilicus Mundi (Latin for "The Navel of the World"), the mystic "Center of The Earth" which is supposed to be a certain point from where a person could control the energies and shapes of the Earth, thus reforming it at will. The novel takes this even further by suggesting that (in the view of the conspiratorialists) monuments like the Eiffel Tower are nothing more than giant antennas related to these energies.

In Thomas Pynchon's 1997 novel Mason & Dixon, Telluric currents, along what are effectively ley lines, are discovered to be a means of mysterious communication and are associated with the book's Chinese-Jesuit subplot. As with Eco, cited above, Pynchon also reflects upon Hollow Earth theories in this work.

== See also ==
- Atmospheric electricity – Electricity in planetary atmospheres
- Birkeland current – Currents flowing along geomagnetic field lines
- Electrical resistivity tomography – Geophysical technique for imaging sub-surface structures
- Geomagnetically induced current – Ground level manifestation of space weather
- Geomagnetic jerk – Sudden change in the Earth's magnetic field
- Levantine Iron Age Anomaly – Iron Age geomagnetic anomaly
- Magnetohydrodynamics – Model of electrically conducting fluids
- Magnetotellurics – Electromagnetic geophysical technique
- Seismo-electromagnetics – Electro-magnetic phenomena
