= VAN method =

Claimed earthquake prediction method

The VAN method – named after P. Varotsos, K. Alexopoulos and K. Nomicos, authors of the 1981 papers describing it – measures low frequency electric signals, termed "seismic electric signals" (SES), by which Varotsos and several colleagues claimed to have successfully predicted earthquakes in Greece. Both the method itself and the manner by which successful predictions were claimed have been severely criticized. Supporters of VAN have responded to the criticism but the critics have not retracted their views.

Since 2001, the VAN group has introduced a concept they call "natural time", applied to the analysis of their precursors. Initially it is applied on SES to distinguish them from noise and relate them to a possible impending earthquake. In case of verification (classification as "SES activity"), natural time analysis is additionally applied to the general subsequent seismicity of the area associated with the SES activity, in order to improve the time parameter of the prediction. The method treats earthquake onset as a critical phenomenon.

After 2006, VAN say that all alarms related to SES activity have been made public by posting at arxiv.org. One such report was posted on Feb. 1, 2008, two weeks before the strongest earthquake in Greece during the period 1983-2011. This earthquake occurred on February 14, 2008, with magnitude (Mw) 6.9. VAN's report was also described in an article in the newspaper Ethnos on Feb. 10, 2008. However, Gerassimos Papadopoulos complained that the VAN reports were confusing and ambiguous, and that "none of the claims for successful VAN predictions is justified", but this complaint was answered on the same issue.

== Description of the VAN method ==
Prediction of earthquakes with this method is based on the detection, recording and evaluation of seismic electric signals or SES. These electrical signals have a fundamental frequency component of 1 Hz or less and an amplitude the logarithm of which scales with the magnitude of the earthquake. According to VAN proponents, SES are emitted by rocks under stresses caused by plate-tectonic forces. There are three types of reported electric signal:

- Electric signals that occur shortly before a major earthquake. Signals of this type were recorded 6.5 hours before the 1995 Kobe earthquake in Japan, for example.
- Electric signals that occur some time before a major earthquake.
- A gradual variation in the Earth's electric field some time before an earthquake.

Several hypotheses have been proposed to explain SES:

- Stress-related phenomena: Seismic electric signals are perhaps attributed to the piezoelectric behaviour of some minerals, especially quartz, or to effects related to the behavior of crystallographic defects under stress or strain. Series of SES, termed SES activities (which are recorded before major earthquakes), may appear a few weeks to a few months before an earthquake when the mechanical stress reaches a critical value. The generation of electric signals by minerals under high stress leading to fracture has been confirmed with laboratory experiments.
- Thermoelectric phenomena: Alternately, Chinese researchers proposed a mechanism which relies on the thermoelectric effect in magnetite.
- Groundwater phenomena: Three mechanisms have been proposed relying on the presence of groundwater in generating SES. The electrokinetic effect is associated with the motion of groundwater during a change in pore pressure. The seismic dynamo effect is associated with the motion of ions in groundwater relative to the geomagnetic field as a seismic wave creates displacement. Circular polarization would be characteristic of the seismic dynamo effect, and this has been observed both for artificial and natural seismic events. A radon ionization effect, caused by radon release and then subsequent ionization of material in groundwater, may also be active. The main isotope of radon is radioactive with a half-life of 3.9 days, and the nuclear decay of radon is known to have an ionizing effect on air. Many publications have reported increased radon concentration in the vicinity of some active tectonic faults a few weeks prior to strong seismic events. However, a strong correlation between radon anomalies and seismic events has not been demonstrated.

While the electrokinetic effect may be consistent with signal detection tens or hundreds of kilometers away, the other mechanisms require a second mechanism to account for propagation:

- Signal transmission along faults: In one model, seismic electric signals propagate with relatively low attenuation along tectonic faults, due to the increased electrical conductivity caused either by the intrusion of ground water into the fault zone(s) or by the ionic characteristics of the minerals.
- Rock circuit: In the defect model, the presence of charge carriers and holes can be modeled as making an extensive circuit.

Seismic electric signals are detected at stations which consist of pairs of electrodes (oriented NS and EW) inserted into the ground, with amplifiers and filters. The signals are then transmitted to the VAN scientists in Athens where they are recorded and evaluated. Currently the VAN team operates 9 stations, while in the past (until 1989) they could afford up to 17.

The VAN team claimed that they were able to predict earthquakes of magnitude larger than 5, with an uncertainty of 0.7 units of magnitude, within a radius of 100 km, and in time window ranging from several hours to a few weeks. Several papers confirmed this success rate, leading to statistically significant conclusion. For example, there were eight M ≥ 5.5 earthquakes in Greece from January 1, 1984 through September 10, 1995, and the VAN network forecast six of these.

The VAN method has also been used in Japan, but in early attempts success comparable to that achieved in Greece was "difficult" to attain. A preliminary investigation of seismic electric signals in France led to encouraging results.

== Earthquake prediction using "natural time" analysis ==
Since 2001 the VAN team has attempted to improve the accuracy of the estimation of the time of the forthcoming earthquake. To that end, they introduced the concept of natural time, a time series analysis technique which puts weight on a process based on the ordering of events. Two terms characterize each event, the "natural time" χ, and the energy Q. χ is defined as k/N, where k is an integer (the k-th event) and N is the total number of events in the time sequence of data. A related term, p_{k}, is the ratio Q_{k} / Q_{total}, which describes the fractional energy released. They introduce a critical term κ, the "variance in natural time", which puts extra weight on the energy term p_{k}:

$$\kappa=\sum_{k=1}^N p_k(\chi_k)^2 - \bigl(\sum_{k=1}^N p_k\chi_k\bigr)^2$$

where $\textstyle\chi_k=k/N$ and $\textstyle\ p_k=\frac{Q_k}{\sum_{n=1}^N Q_n}$

Their current method deems SES valid when κ = 0.070. Once the SES are deemed valid, a second analysis is started in which the subsequent seismic (rather than electric) events are noted, and the region is divided up as a Venn diagram with at least two seismic events per overlapping rectangle. When the distribution of κ for the rectangular regions has its maximum at κ = 0.070, a critical seismic event is imminent, i.e. it will occur in a few days to one week or so, and a report is issued.

=== Results ===
The VAN team claim that out of seven mainshocks with magnitude Mw>=6.0 from 2001 through 2010 in the region of latitude N 36° to N 41° and longitude E 19° to E 27°, all but one could be classified with relevant SES activity identified and reported in advance through natural time analysis. Additionally, they assert that the occurrence time of four of these mainshocks with magnitude Mw>=6.4 were identified to within "a narrow range, a few days to around one week or so." These reports are inserted in papers housed in arXiv, and new reports are made and uploaded there. For example, a report preceding the strongest earthquake in Greece during the period 1983-2011, which occurred on February 14, 2008, with magnitude (Mw) 6.9, was publicized in arXiv almost two weeks before, on February 1, 2008. A description of the updated VAN method was collected in a book published by Springer in 2011, titled "Natural Time Analysis: The New View of Time."

Natural time analysis also claims that the physical connection of SES activities with earthquakes is as follows: Taking the view that the earthquake occurrence is a phase-change (critical phenomenon), where the new phase is the mainshock occurrence, the above-mentioned variance term κ is the corresponding order parameter. The κ value calculated for a window comprising a number of seismic events comparable to the average number of earthquakes occurring within a few months, fluctuates when the window is sliding through a seismic catalogue. The VAN team claims that these κ fluctuations exhibit a minimum a few months before a mainshock occurrence and in addition this minimum occurs simultaneously with the initiation of the corresponding SES activity, and that this is the first time in the literature that such a simultaneous appearance of two precursory phenomena in independent datasets of different geophysical observables (electrical measurements, seismicity) has been observed. Furthermore, the VAN team claims that their natural time analysis of the seismic catalogue of Japan during the period from January 1, 1984 until the occurrence of the magnitude 9.0 Tohoku earthquake on March 11, 2011, revealed that such clear minima of the κ fluctuations appeared before all major earthquakes with magnitude 7.6 or larger. The deepest of these minima was said to occur on January 5, 2011, i.e., almost two months before the Tohoku earthquake occurrence. Finally, by dividing the Japanese region into small areas, the VAN team states that some small areas show minimum of the κ fluctuations almost simultaneously with the large area covering the whole Japan and such small areas clustered within a few hundred kilometers from the actual epicenter of the impending major earthquake.

== Criticisms of VAN ==
Historically, the usefulness of the VAN method for prediction of earthquakes had been a matter of debate. Both positive and negative criticism on an older conception of the VAN method is summarized in the 1996 book "A Critical Review of VAN", edited by Sir James Lighthill. A critical review of the statistical methodology was published by Y. Y. Kagan of UCLA in 1997. Note that these criticisms predate the time series analysis methods introduced by the VAN group in 2001. The main points of the criticism were:

=== Predictive success ===
Critics say that the VAN method is hindered by a lack of statistical testing of the validity of the hypothesis because the researchers keep changing the parameters (the moving the goalposts technique).

VAN has claimed to have observed at a recording station in Athens a perfect record of a one-to-one correlation between SESs and earthquake of magnitude ≥ 2.9 which occurred 7 hours later in all of Greece. However, Max Wyss said that the list of earthquake used for the correlation was false. Although VAN stated in their article that the list of earthquakes was that of the Bulletin of the National Observatory of Athens (NOA), Wyss found that 37% of the earthquakes actually listed in the bulletin, including the largest one, were not in the list used by VAN for issuing their claim. In addition, 40% of the earthquake which VAN claimed had occurred were not in the NOA bulletin. Examining the probability of chance correlation of another set of 22 claims of successful predictions by VAN of M > 4.0 from January 1, 1987 through November 30, 1989 it was found that 74% were false, 9% correlated by chance, and for 14% the correlation was uncertain. No single event correlated at a probability greater than 85%, whereas the level required in statistics for accepting a hypothesis test as positive would more commonly be 95%.

In response to Wyss' analysis of the NOA findings, VAN said that the criticisms were based on misunderstandings. VAN said that the calculations suggested by Wyss would lead to a paradox, i.e., to probability values larger than unity, when applied to an ideal earthquake prediction method. Other independent evaluations said that VAN obtained statistically significant results.

Mainstream seismologists remain unconvinced by any of VAN's rebuttals. In 2011 the ICEF concluded that the optimistic prediction capability claimed by VAN could not be validated. Most seismologists consider VAN to have been "resoundingly debunked".

Uyeda and others in 2011, however, supported the use of the technique. In 2018, the statistical significance of the method was revisited by the VAN group employing modern techniques, such as event coincidence analysis (ECA) and receiver operating characteristic (ROC), which they interpreted to show that SES exhibit precursory information far beyond chance.

=== Proposed SES propagation mechanism ===
An analysis of the propagation properties of SES in the Earth's crust showed that it is impossible that signals with the amplitude reported by VAN could have been generated by small earthquakes and transmitted over the several hundred kilometers between the epicenter and the receiving station. In effect, if the mechanism is based on piezoelectricity or electrical charging of crystal deformations with the signal traveling along faults, then none of the earthquakes which VAN claimed were preceded by SES generated an SES themselves. VAN answered that such an analysis of the SES propagation properties is based on a simplified model of horizontally layered Earth and that this differs greatly from the real situation since Earth's crust contains inhomogeneities. When the latter are taken into account, for example by considering that the faults are electrically appreciably more conductive than the surrounding medium, VAN believes that electric signals transmitted at distances of the order of one hundred kilometers between the epicenter and the receiving station have amplitudes comparable to those reported by VAN.

=== Electromagnetic compatibility issues ===
VAN's publications are further weakened by failure to address the problem of eliminating the many and strong sources of change in the magneto-electric field measured by them, such as telluric currents from weather, and electromagnetic interference (EMI) from man-made signals. One critical paper (Pham et al 1998) clearly correlates an SES used by the VAN group with digital radio transmissions made from a military base. In a subsequent paper, VAN said that such noise coming from digital radio transmitters of the military database has been clearly distinguished from true SES by following the criteria developed by VAN. Further work in Greece by Pham et al in 2002 has tracked SES-like "anomalous transient electric signals" back to specific human sources, and found that such signals are not excluded by the criteria used by VAN to identify SES.

In 2003, modern methods of statistical physics, i.e., detrended fluctuation analysis (DFA), multifractal DFA and wavelet transform revealed that SES are clearly distinguished from those produced by human sources, since the former signals exhibit very strong long range correlations, while the latter signals do not. A work published in 2020 examined the statistical significance of the minima of the fluctuations of the order parameter κ1 of seismicity by event coincidence analysis as a possible precursor to strong earthquakes in both regional and global level. The results show that these minima are indeed statistically significant earthquake precursors. In particular, in the regional studies the time lag was found to be fully compatible with the finding that these mimima are simultaneous with the initiation of SES activities, thus the distinction of the latter precursory signals from those produced by human sources is evident.

=== Public policy ===
Finally, one requirement for any earthquake prediction method is that, in order for any prediction to be useful, it must predict a forthcoming earthquake within a reasonable time-frame, epicenter and magnitude. If the prediction is too vague, no feasible decision (such as to evacuate the population of a certain area for a given period of time) can be made. In practice, the VAN group issued a series of telegrams in the 1980s. During the same time frame, the technique also missed major earthquakes, in the sense that "for earthquakes with Mb≥5.0, the ratio of the predicted to the total number of earthquakes is 6/12 (50%) and the success rate of the prediction is also 6/12 (50%) with the probability gain of a factor of 4. With a confidence level of 99.8%, the possibility of this success rate being explained by a random model of earthquake occurrence taking into account the regional factor which includes high seismicity in the prediction area, can be rejected". This study concludes that "the statistical examination of the SES predictions proved high rates of success prediction and predicted events with high probability gain. This suggests a physical connection between SES and subsequent earthquakes, at least for an event of magnitude of Ms≥5". Predictions from the early VAN method led to public criticism and the cost associated with false alarms generated ill will. In 2016 the Union of Greek Physicists honored P. Varotsos for his work on VAN with a prize delivered by the President of Greece.

=== Updated VAN method ===
A review of the updated VAN method in 2020 says that it suffers from an abundance of false positives and is therefore not usable as a prediction protocol. VAN group answered by pinpointing misunderstandings in the specific reasoning.

== See also ==
- Earthquake prediction
- Seismology
- Seismo-electromagnetics
