= Berit Svendsen =

Norwegian engineer and business executive

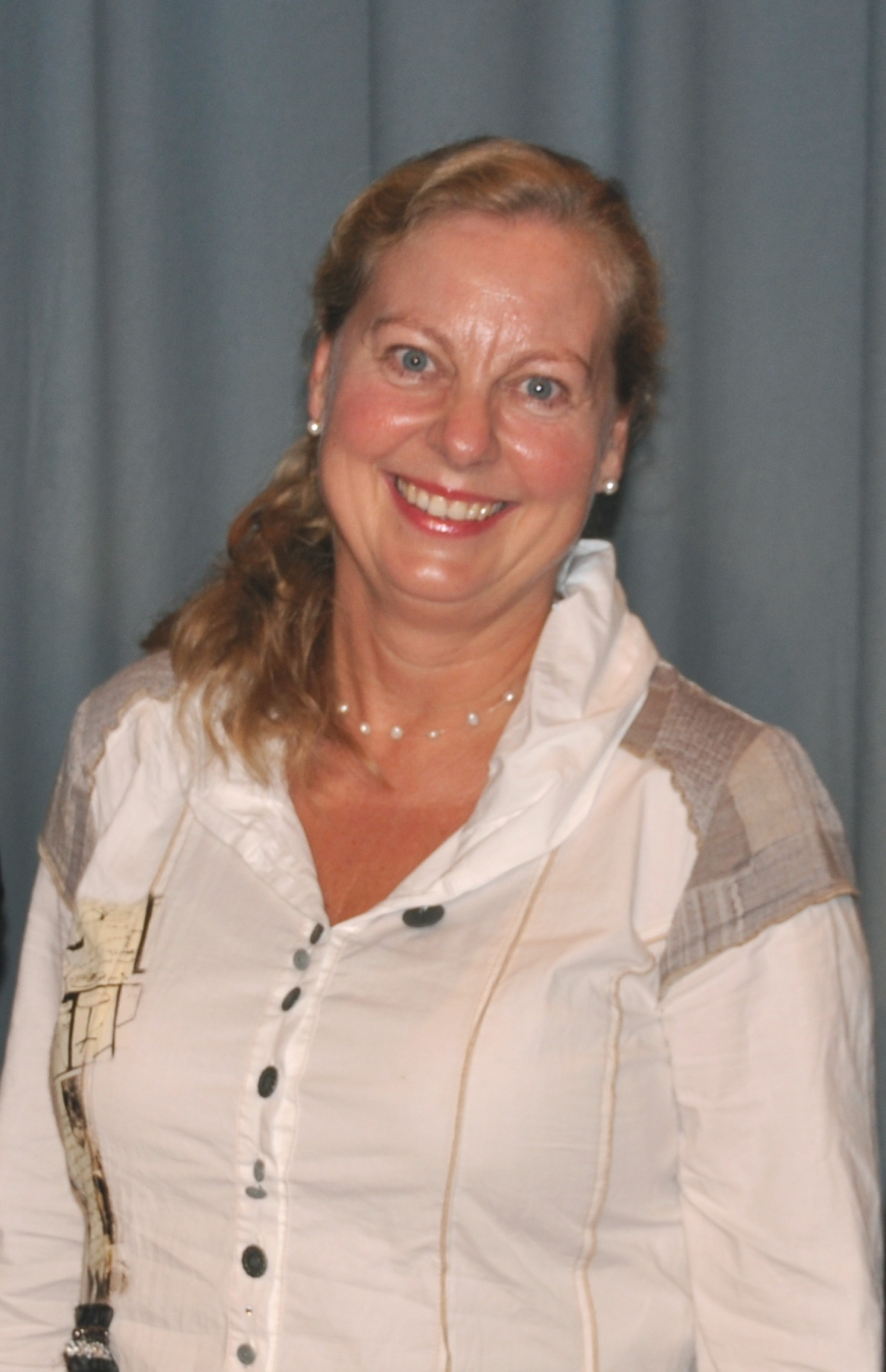
Berit Svendsen

Berit Svendsen (born 7 April 1963) is a Norwegian engineer and business executive. As of September 2015, she is a vice president of the Telenor Group and head of Telenor Norway. 4 September 2018 she resigned from both positions after longer internal turmoil in the Telenor Group, both positions held since 20 September 2011.

== Biography ==
Born on 7 April 1963 in Frederikstad, Svendsen grew up in Kråkerøy, an island in the south-east of Norway. After demonstrating interest in mathematics and physics at high school, in 1983 she went to Trondheim to spend five years studying engineering at the Norwegian Institute of Technology where she earned an MSc in electronics. She completed her education in 1995 with a master's degree in technology management from the Norwegian Institute of Technology in collaboration with the Massachusetts Institute of Technology.

In 1988, she joined Telenor as a research scientist, attracted by the potential of telecommunications and the internet. After completing her masters at MIT in Boston, Massachusetts, she was promoted first to head of department and later to head of division for data services at Telenor Nett. In 1999, she was given special responsibility for Telenor's Fixed-Mobile Convergence project which quickly led to her appointment in 2000 as technology director for all of Telenor's departments, a post she held for the next five years. In 2005, she became Vice President and Head of Telenor Nordic Fixed.

From 2002 to 2007, Svendsen was a member of the European Commission's ISTAG, an advisory group on information society technologies. In 2008, she spent a short period as CEO of Conax which at the time was owned by Telenor. She returned to Telenor in September 2011 as Executive Vice President Telenor Group and CEO of Telenor Norway, a position she continues to hold.

Svendsen also serves on the boards of the banking and financial services group DNB (since 2011) and (since 2007) EMGS which provides technical support to oil and gas companies.

== Personal life ==
Svendsen is married to Erik Østbye (who also works at Telenor), and has two adopted children from Chile. Her interests include cooking (especially Thai dishes), swimming in the sea, water aerobics, reading and history. She enjoys relaxing in her summerhouse on one of the Hvaler islands.
