= CSEM =

Csem or CSEM may refer to:

- CSEM, the school of Computer Science, Engineering and Mathematics, at Flinders University, Australia
- Child sexual exploitation material, an alternative name for child pornography
- Swiss Center for Electronics and Microtechnology (French: Centre suisse d'électronique et de microtechnique), a Swiss research and development company, located in Neuchâtel
- Controlled source electro-magnetic, an offshore geophysical technique

== See also ==
- Csém, a village in Hungary
