= Transient electromagnetics =

Transient electromagnetics, (also time-domain electromagnetics / TDEM), is a geophysical exploration technique in which electric and magnetic fields are induced by transient pulses of electric current and the subsequent decay response measured. TEM / TDEM methods are generally able to determine subsurface electrical properties, but are also sensitive to subsurface magnetic properties in applications like UXO detection and characterization. TEM/TDEM surveys are a very common surface EM technique for mineral exploration, groundwater exploration, and for environmental mapping, used throughout the world in both onshore and offshore applications. In the 1960s and 1970s, the method was actively developed in the works of Soviet scientists, including A. A. Kaufman and V. A. Sidorov.

== Physical principles ==
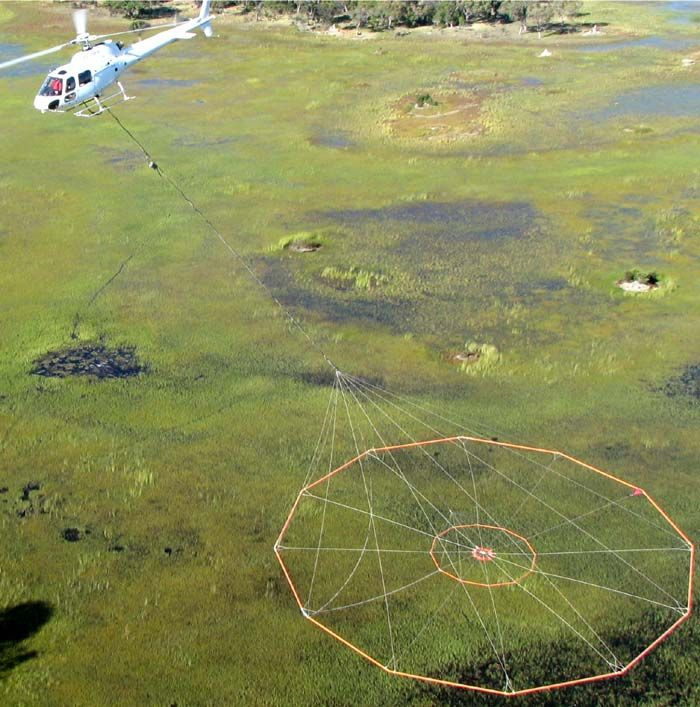
Helicopter Conducting TDEM Survey

Two fundamental electromagnetic principles are required to derive the physics behind TEM surveys: Faraday's law of induction and Lenz's Law. A loop of wire is generally energized by a direct current. At some time (t_{0}) the current is cut off as quickly as possible. Faraday's law dictates that a nearly identical current is induced in the subsurface to preserve the magnetic field produced by the original current (eddy currents). Due to ohmic losses, the induced surface currents dissipate—this causes a change in the magnetic field, which induces subsequent eddy currents. The net result is a downward and outward diffusion of currents in the subsurface which appear as an expanding smoke ring when the current density is contoured.

These currents produce a magnetic field by Faraday's law. At the surface, the change in magnetic field [flux] with time is measured. The way the currents diffuse in the subsurface is related to the conductivity distribution in the ground.

This is a basic view of the physical principles involved. When conductive bodies are present, the diffusion of the transients is changed. In addition, transients are induced in the conductive bodies as well. This is only the most basic overview. The paper by McNeill is freely available from the Geonics website explaining the basics of the method.

== TEM/TDEM instrumentation and sensors ==
TEM/TDEM systems consist of a transmitter instrument, transmitting coil or transmitting wire, receiver coil or antenna, and receiver instrument. Depending on subsurface resistivity, current induced, receiver sensitivity and transmitter-receiver geometry, TEM/TDEM measurements allow geophysical exploration from a few metres below the surface to several hundred metres of depth.

Low-power TEM/TDEM instruments can operate using C-cell batteries, and mid-range systems (approx. 2.5 kW) can operate with automotive batteries; more powerful systems (20 kW~150 kW) require a separate generator usually mounted on a truck, plane, or helicopter to provide the necessary current for deep investigations.

== Commercial applications ==
- Mining (mineral location and characterization)
- Groundwater characterization
- HVDC injection point mapping
- Oil and gas exploration

== See also ==
- Geophysics
- Exploration geophysics, a branch of geophysics for discovering and mapping mineral resources and useful geological structures
- Magnetotellurics
- Seismo-electromagnetics
- Reflection seismology
- Electrical resistivity tomography, another geophysical technique of imaging
- SNMR
