= Computational Spectroscopy In Natural Sciences and Engineering =

Computational Spectroscopy in Natural Science and Engineering
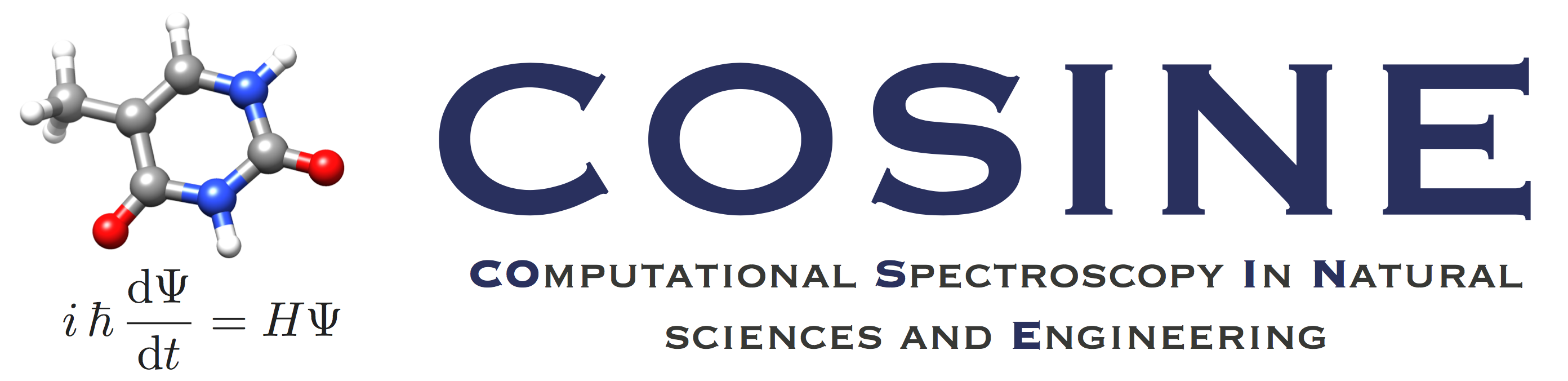
- COSINE Logo

Informations
- Name: Computational Spectroscopy in Natural Science and Engineering
- Abbreviation: COSINE
- Period: From 2018-01-01 to 2021-12-31
- Purpose: Devising novel theoretical tools and computational codes for the investigation of organic photochemistry

Project details
- Total cost: 3745978.92 €
- EU contribution: 3745978.92 €
- Coordinated in: Germany
- Topic: MSCA-ITN-2017 - Innovative Training Networks

COmputational Spectroscopy In Natural Sciences and Engineering (COSINE) is a Marie Skłodowska-Curie Innovative Training Network in the field of theoretical and computational chemistry, focused on computational spectroscopy. The main goal of the projects is to develop theoretical tools: computational codes based on electronic structure theory for the investigation of organic photochemistry and for simulation of spectroscopic experiments. It is part of the European Union's Horizon 2020 research funding framework.

== Objective ==
The main purpose of COSINE is the development of ab-initio research tools to study optical properties and excited electronic states, which are dominated by electron correlation. This tools are developed for the investigation of organic photochemistry with the aim of accurate simulation of spectroscopic experiments on the computer. To this end a complementary series of tools, rooted in coupled cluster, algebraic diagrammatic construction, density functional theory, as well as selected multi-reference methods, are developed.

== Nodes ==
The project is divided into 8 different nodes:

- Node 1, Heidelberg University is the coordinating node, led by Andreas Dreuw
- Node 2, KTH Royal Institute of Technology in Stockholm, led by Patrick Norman
- Node 3, LMU Munich, led by Christian Ochsenfeld
- Node 4, Scuola Normale Superiore in Pisa, led by Chiara Cappelli
- Node 5, University of Southern Denmark in Odense, led by Jacob Kongsted
- Node 6, L'École Nationale Supérieure de Chimie de Paris, led by Ilaria Ciofini
- Node 7, Norwegian University of Science and Technology in Trondheim, led by Henrik Koch
- Node 8, Technical University of Denmark in Lyngby, led by Sonia Coriani

- This project has received funding from the European Union’s Horizon 2020 research and innovation programme under the Marie Skłodowska-Curie grant agreement N° 765739

== Partner organisations ==
- ELETTRA, Sincotrone Trieste, Italy;
- Electromagnetic Geoservices ASA, Norway;
- EXACT LAB SRL, Italy;
- Nvidia GmbH, Germany;
- DELL S.P.A., Italy;
- Inc., United States;
- PDC Center for High-Performance Computing, KTH, Sweden;
- Dipartimento di Scienze Chimiche e Farmaceutiche, Università degli Studi di Trieste, Italy.
