= LIAA =

LIAA may refer to:

- Investment and Development Agency of Latvia, acts under the Ministry of Economics of the Republic of Latvia.
- Levantine Iron Age Anomaly, a geomagnetic anomaly which occurred between 1050 and 700 BCE.
