= Atlas of Terrestrial Group Planets and their Moons =

1992 planetary atlas published in Moscow

The Atlas of Terrestrial Group Planets and their Moons (Russian: Атлас планет Земной группы и их спутников) is a Soviet-era planetary atlas published in the Russian language in Moscow. It summarizes Soviet and American planetary science results in thematic maps of Mercury, Venus, the Moon, Mars, Phobos, and also includes Earth maps for all themes for comparison. This makes it the first comparative planetological atlas, made using traditional cartographic techniques.

== Significance and features ==
Some of the newly imaged terrain revealed for the first time by Russian spacecraft and then shown in Russian-published map sheets were depicted in an Atlas format for the first time, and it is the first publication that uniformly utilized the Cyrillic planetary nomenclature developed by Russian scientists, of which several names were originally Russian and later transcribed for the officially Latin IAU nomenclature. Its significance is that it was, and still is, the only cartographic atlas of planetary bodies with a complex geoscience approach that enables comparative planetological studies. Thematic and generic physical maps using traditional (manual) cartographic techniques of the planets were produced using similar methodology.

== English language digital version ==
Its English language, updated digital, version was published in Moscow in 2007 by the Planetary Cartography Laboratory at the Moscow State University for Geodesy and Cartography (MIIGAiK). Pages were scanned for the project, although the digital version contains no images.

== Sections ==
Sections (and thematic maps) include the following themes:

1. Shaded relief maps (using pencil drawings)
2. Blank maps (outlines of main features, different tones for the main topographic or albedo domains, plus nomenclature)
3. Hypsometric maps (relief shown by colors)
4. Albedo maps (overlain by the blank map outlines)
5. Geophysical maps
6. Geologo-morphologic maps
7. Discovery and flights maps
8. Photographic coverage maps
9. Cartographic coverage maps

== Editing and publication ==
It was edited by VD Bolshakov, Kira Shingareva, Jeanna F Rodionova and their colleagues in 12 years' of work at the MIIGAiK.

The atlas contains 208 pages. It was printed in 1992, in 500 copies. The publisher was MIIGAiK University, Moscow.

== Maps ==
Several of the hand-drawn basemaps in this Atlas were later used in the series of Multilingual Maps for Terrestrial Planets and their Moons, published in Dresden and Budapest. The map design utilized in the Atlas also affected subsequent planetary globes produced at MIIGAiK where it was developed, such as the Globe of Mercury and the maps of Io and Enceladus.
