= Valery Korepanov =

Ukrainian scientist (born 1943)

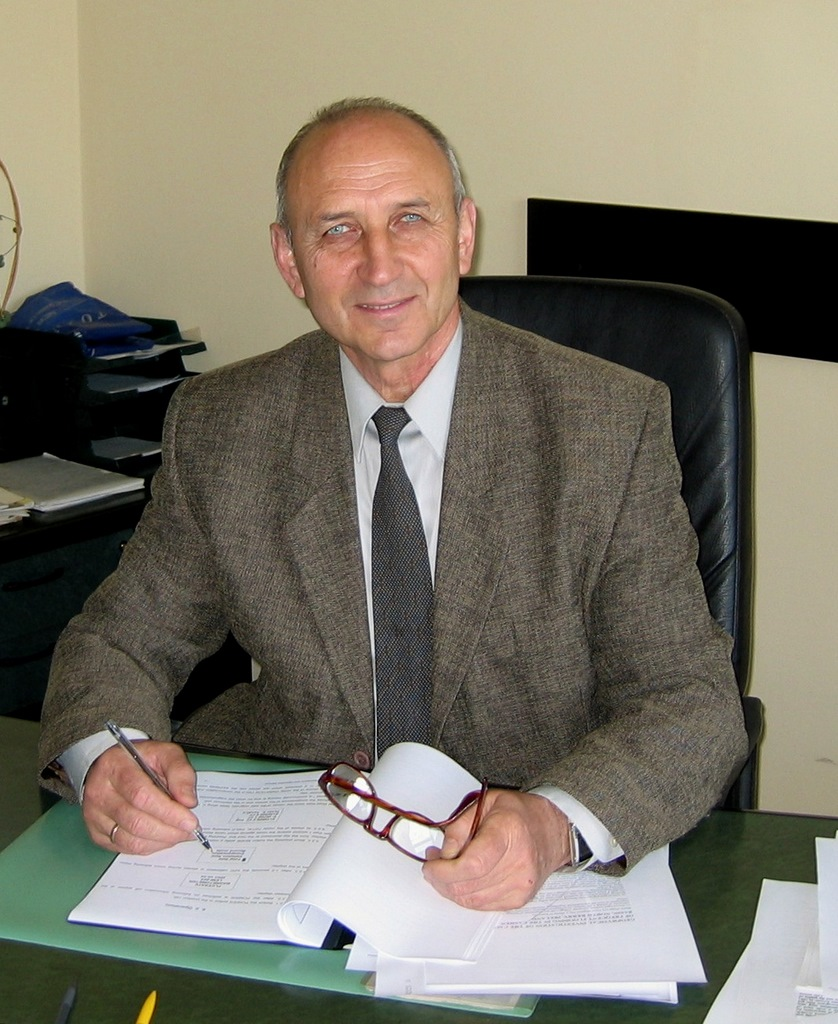
- Born: July 1, 1943; Former Soviet Union
- Education: Lviv Polytechnic
- Occupation: Scientific Director of the Lviv Centre of Institute for Space Research
- Website: http://www.isr.lviv.ua/korepanov.htm

Valery Korepanov (Ukrainian: Валерій Євгенійович Корепанов) is a Ukrainian scientist was born on 1 July 1943 in the (former) Soviet Union. Since 1996 he has been the Scientific Director of the Lviv Centre of Institute for Space Research of National Academy of Sciences of Ukraine and State Space Agency of Ukraine.

== Biography ==
Graduated from Lviv Polytechnical Institute as electric engineer in 1965.

Ph.D. Degree in Electromagnetic Measurements in Lviv Polytechnical Institute in 1970.

Habilitation of Ph.D. in Geophysics in Institute of Physics of the Earth (Moscow) in 1991.

The first 30 years of his career he was active at the Institute of Physics and Mechanics (Lviv, Ukraine).

== Publications ==
Number of publications: 450 (Publications list (1997-2012))

- Korepanov V., Berkman R., New approach to the exact design of low noise search-coil magnetometers, XIV IMEKO World Congress, V. IVA, 1997, Topic 4, pp. 97–102.
- Korepanov V., Berkman R., Digital flux-gate magnetometer structural analysis, Meas. Sci. Technol., 10 (1999), pp. 734–737.
- F.Dudkin, V.Korepanov, G. Lizunov. Experiment VARIANT - first results from Wave Probe instrument. Advances in Space Research. Volume 43, Issue 12, 1904-1909 (2009).
- Sopruniuk P.M., Klimov S.I., Korepanov V.E., Electric fields in space plasma, Kiev, NAUKOVA DUMKA, 1994, 190 p. (in Russian).
- В.Е.Koрeпaнoв, А.Н.Свенсон. Высокоточные неполяризующиеся электроды для наземной геофизической разведки. К. Наукова думка. 2007. 96 с. ISBN 978-966-00-0688-1 (in Russian).
- Korepanov V., Marusenkov А. Flux-Gate Magnetometers Design Peculiarities. Surveys in Geophysics. September 2012, Volume 33, Issue 5, pp 1059–1079

== Awards, Honours ==
- Badge of Merit by Aerospace association of Ukraine (2013);
- Christiaan Huygens Medal (2009);
- State Prize of Ukraine winner (2008);
- Order "For Merits" (2003);
- Honoured Diploma of Presidium of National Academy of Sciences of Ukraine (2001);
- Honoured Scientist of Ukraine (1997);
- Honoured Diploma and medal of Presidium of Academy of Sciences of USSR (1973);
- Bronze medal of USSR Exposition of National Achievements (1985).

== Membership of Professional Societies ==
- International Academy of Astronautics (IAA) member
- Committee on Space Research (COSPAR) National board member
- International Association of Geomagnetism and Aeronomy (IAGA) WG 5-OBS on Geomagnetic Observatories member
- National Space Review and National Antarctic Bulletin editorial boards member
- European Geosciences Union (EGU) Geophysical Instrumentation Division member
- Electromagnetic Studies of Earthquakes and Volcanoes (EMSEV) bureau member
