= Lviv Centre of Institute for Space Research =

Lviv branch of the actual institute

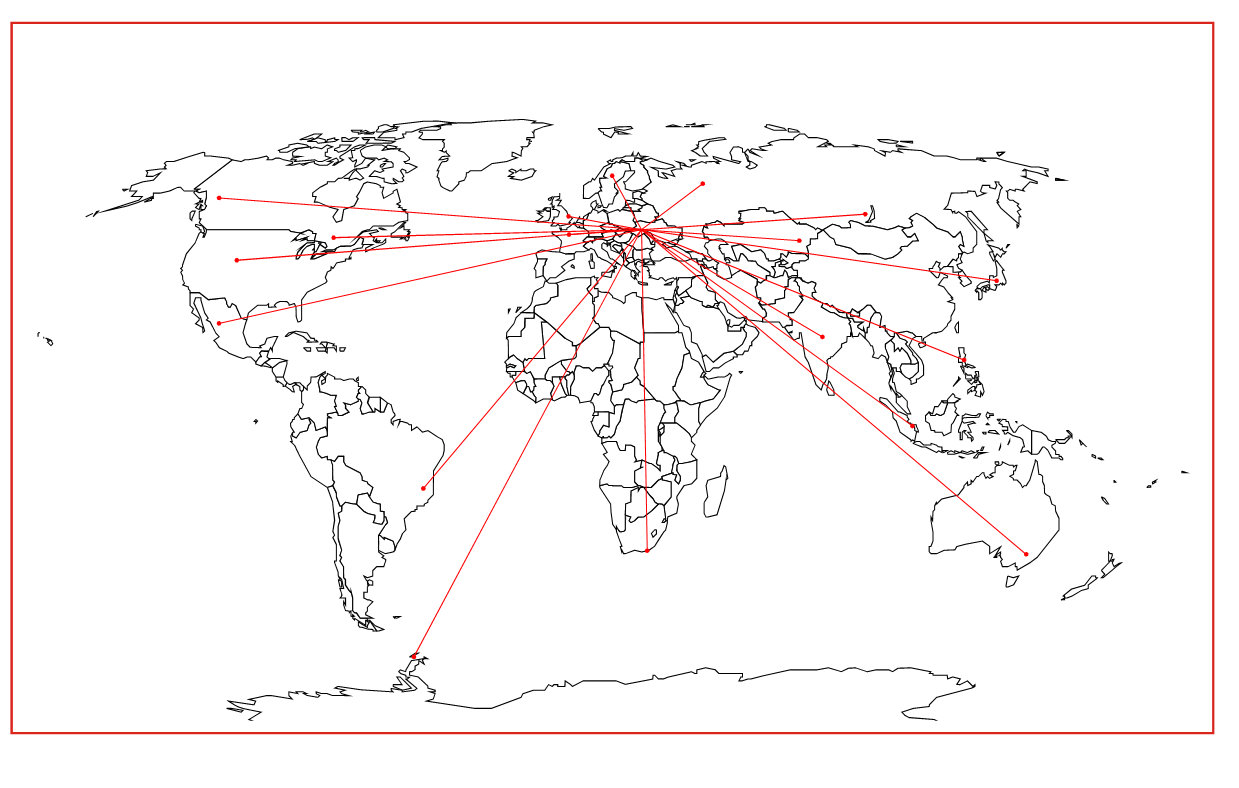
LC ISR international relations

The Lviv Centre of Institute for Space Research (LC ISR), is a research institute in Lviv, Ukraine. It falls under the purview of the NASU and NSAU, (Ukrainian: Львівський центр Інституту космічних досліджень НАН України та НКА України, romanized: Lvivskyi tsentr Instytutu kosmichnykh doslidzhen NAN Ukrainy ta NKA Ukrainy).

== Structure ==
At present, about one hundred specialists work at the center. Among them, one member belongs to the International Academy of Astronautics, one Doctor of Sciences, and nine Candidates of Sciences (PHD).

LC ISR consists of three scientific departments and one laboratory, and performs fundamental and applied research in the following interdisciplinary scientific directions:

- propagation theory and experimental study of electromagnetic fields in conducting media such as plasma, ground and sea water
- development of advanced sensors and systems for measuring the parameters of physical fields and data collection and processing for space industry and geophysical applications.

Development and production of flux-gate magnetometers (FGM) and induction magnetometers (IM) with the highest parameters values possible constitute the main LC ISR activity areas.

Reduction of weight, energy loss and noise level can be placed among the main directions of FGM and IM designing, which aims to reach world standards level. The center with its engineering divisions has made a significant contribution in providing a solution to the large-scale fundamental and applied scientific problems, including:

- development of theoretical substantiation of lithosphere-ionosphere coupling through the acoustic and atmospheric gravity waves with the aim to clarify the mechanism of ionospheric earthquakes precursors formation
- development of the mechanism of earthquakes electromagnetic precursors recognition in focal area and designing specialized instruments for these precursors detection
- studying of electronic circuits interaction process with the aim to provide as low as possible sensitivity threshold of measuring devices for space, ground and sea bed applications
- development and adoption of new methodology to provide autonomous objects electromagnetic cleanliness, and to realize their calibration without operation process interruption
- adoption of space instrumentation development technology for manufacturing advanced geophysical systems, used for scientific research and raw materials prospecting (oil, gas etc.).

== Significant scientific achievements and development ==
Over ten different spatial experiments were carried out with the participation of LC ISR specialists. LC ISR proposed scientific conception of the first national scientific experiment “Variant” (укр. Варіант) on the board of artificial satellite “Sich-1M” with international scientific payload. The measuring of the direct density of space current in plasma was performed for the first time here.

A generalized approach to the recognition of the precursory signals of earthquake preparation process when structural changes and anomalies occur in the Earth's crust was proposed.

A new physical effect – gamma–magnetic normalization of alloys with high magnetic permeability was discovered here and experimentally confirmed.

A general concept and theoretical basis of the construction of a high-sensitive geophysical system for active electromagnetic logging in wells to study anisotropy of rocks and to detect the near-surface inhomogeneities were created with the aim to develop new methods of mineral exploration.

The scientific concept and realization plan of the ground-spatial experiments “Ionosphere” and “Potential” were developed. Technical documents substantiating the above experiments were prepared. They were included in the National Space Program of Ukraine from 2013 to 2015.

== Membership of Professional Societies ==
The LC ISR scientists are cooperating actively with the world community, to represent Ukraine in the:

- International Academy of Astronautics (IAA);
- Committee on Space Research (COSPAR);
- International Association of Geomagnetism and Aeronomy (IAGA);
- European Geosciences Union (EGU).

== Awards, Honours ==
- Christiaan Huygens Medal (2009): Valery Korepanov
- State Prize of Ukraine winner (2008): Valery Korepanov and Fedor Dudkin.

== Publications ==
Selected publications (Publications list):

- V.Korepanov, Berkman R., New approach to the exact design of low noise search-coil magnetometers, XIV IMEKO World Congress, V. IVA, 1997, Topic 4, pp. 97–102.
- V.Korepanov, Berkman R., Digital flux-gate magnetometer structural analysis, Meas. Sci. Technol., 10 (1999), pp. 734–737.
- F.Dudkin, V.Korepanov, G. Lizunov. Experiment VARIANT - first results from Wave Probe instrument. Advances in Space Research. Volume 43, Issue 12, 1904-1909 (2009).
- Sopruniuk P.M., Klimov S.I., Korepanov V.E., Electric fields in space plasma, Kiev, NAUKOVA DUMKA, 1994, 190 p. (in Russian).
- В.Е.Koрeпaнoв, А.Н.Свенсон. Высокоточные неполяризующиеся электроды для наземной геофизической разведки. К. Наукова думка. 2007. 96 с. ISBN 978-966-00-0688-1 (in Russian).

== Current projects ==
There are now 8 international space projects in which LC ISR is participating: OBSTANOVKA and CHIBIS-M scheduled for International Space Station and RADIOASTRON (launch in 2010), PHOBOS-GRUNT (launch in 2011), RESONANCE (launch in 2012) – all of them with Russian scientists. LC ISR is also collaborating with scientists from India in the preparation of SENSE microsatellite scientific program and payload, Italy (ESPERIA project) and China (CSES microsatellite).

=== POPDAT ===
Problem-Oriented Processing and Database Creation for Ionosphere Exploration. (started on June 1, 2011)

=== Variant ===
The major goal of the VARIANT project on board the SICH-1M satellite is to carry out the study of field-aligned currents as a part of the Space Weather program. It includes direct measurements of current density in the ionosphere combined with the measurements of the magnetic and electric field fluctuations that can serve as new elements in the data set of signatures of the solar wind-magnetosphere-ionosphere coupling. The secondary goal of VARIANT experiment is the statistical study of minor seismogenic effects in the ionosphere and their comparison with the background noise statistical data set (Presentation).

=== International Space Station environment study ===
LC ISR is Co-PI of the international experiment OBSTANOVKA-1 on board the Russian segment of the International Space Station (ISS). The main goal of the experiment is to develop the methodology and instrumentation for EM phenomena investigation in the ISS environment. The automatic mini-buoys and necessary operation procedures needed to fulfill this goal are under development.

=== Electromagnetic investigations at Ukrainian Antarctic Station “Akademik vernadsky” ===
Three-component flux-gate magnetometer LEMI-008 have been installed in the Vernadsky Research Base "Akademik Vernadsky", which is a Ukrainian Antarctic Station at Marina Point on Galindez Island on the Argentine Islands, Antarctica. In January 2001, the equipment for satellite transmission of the magnetometer, which provides the communication via geostationary satellite GOES-E, was installed. On March 11, 2001, the permanent transmission of the LEMI-008 magnetometer data was started. The data is being accumulated on FTP-server after processing in the Canadian information center. Early in 2002, a new high-sensitivity system for magnetic fields 0.3–300 Hz variations based on LEMI-112A sensors has been installed. It expands the range of on-site EMF studies and sets Ukrainian Antarctic Station as one of the world's best equipped. LC ISR is responsible for the operation of the electromagnetic polygon there.

=== Earthquakes monitoring ===
Remote sensing as a tool of seismic hazards monitoring. The project to study the ULF electromagnetic phenomena related to earthquakes. Electromagnetic earthquake precursors monitoring methodology. Methodology of earthquakes preparatory zones location. Active electromagnetic monitoring of earthquakes.

=== Other ===
- Interball
- System for magnetometer calibration
- Sea bottom magnetic field study
- Magnetotelluric study
- Environment

== Advanced geophysical instrumentation manufacturing ==
Instruments produced with FGMs magnetotelluric stations LEMI-417.

- Flux-gate magnetometers
- Induction magnetometers
- Electric field sensors
- Magnetotelluric station
- Meteomagnetic station
- Electroprospecting station
- System for magnetometer calibration
- Gas volume correctors
- Portable subsurface EM sounder
- Instrumentation for scientific balloons
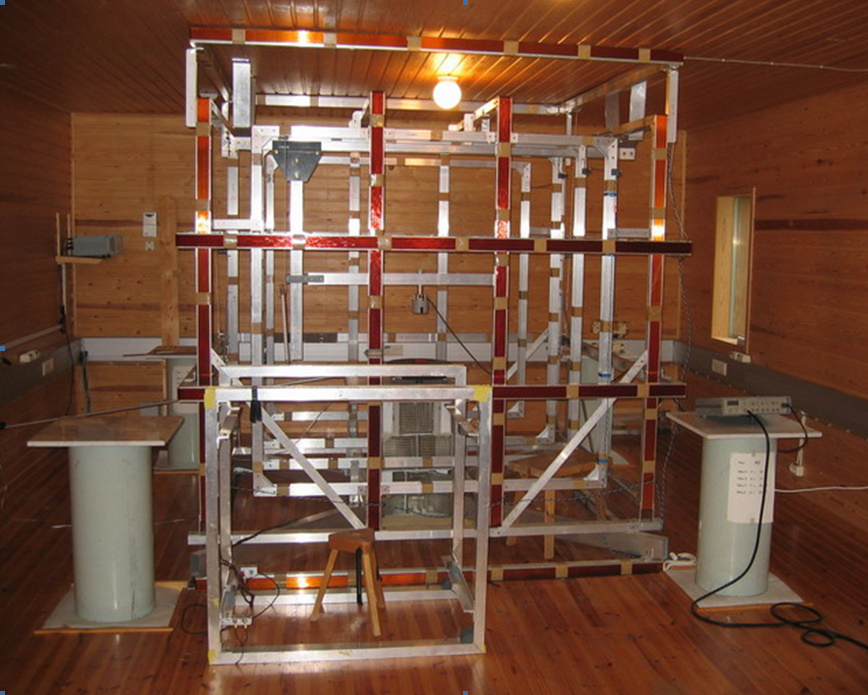
System for magnetometer calibration

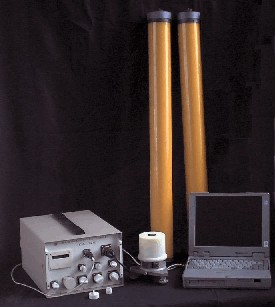
Magnetotelluric station

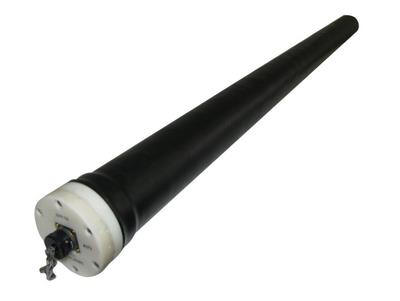
Induction magnetometer

== See also ==
- Ukrainian Optical Facilities for Near-Earth Space Surveillance Network
