= Geomagnetically induced current =

Ground level manifestation of space weather

Geomagnetically induced currents (GICs) are electrical currents induced at the Earth's surface by rapid changes in the Earth's geomagnetic field caused by space weather events. GICs can affect the normal operation of long electrical conductor systems such as electric transmission grids and buried pipelines. The geomagnetic disturbances which induce GICs include geomagnetic storms and substorms where the most severe disturbances occur at high geomagnetic latitudes.

== Background ==
The Earth's magnetic field varies over a wide range of timescales. The longer-term variations, typically occurring over decades to millennia, are predominantly the result of dynamo action in the Earth's core. Geomagnetic variations on timescales of seconds to years also occur, due to dynamic processes in the ionosphere, magnetosphere and heliosphere. These changes are ultimately tied to variations associated with the solar activity (or sunspot) cycle and are manifestations of space weather.

The fact that the geomagnetic field does respond to solar conditions can be useful, for example, in investigating Earth structure using magnetotellurics, but it also creates a hazard. This geomagnetic hazard is primarily a risk to technology under the Earth's protective atmospheric blanket.

== Risk to infrastructure ==
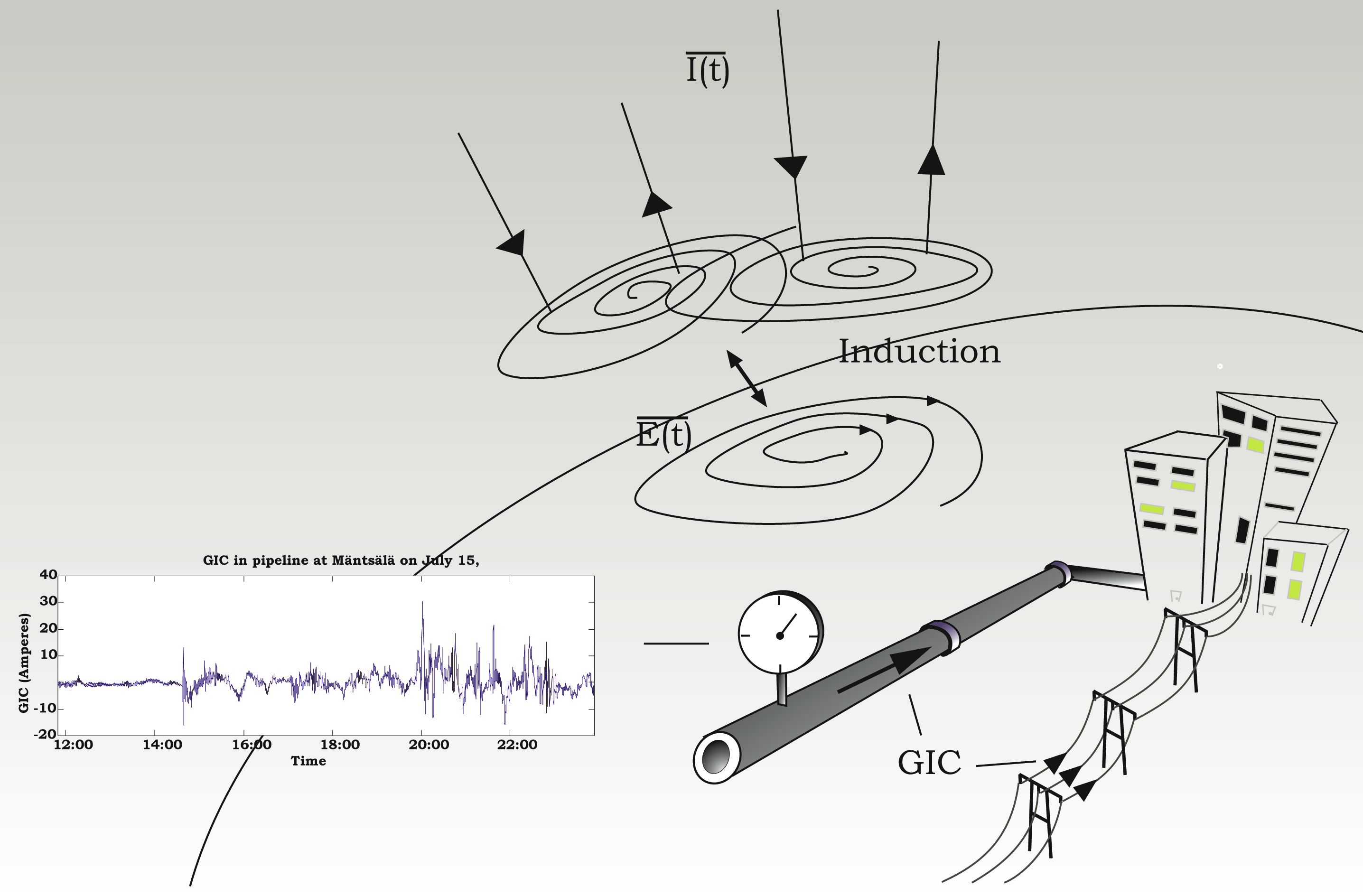
The basic principle for the generation of GIC: variations of the ionospheric currents (I(t)) generate an electric field (E(t)) driving GIC. Shown are also real GIC recordings from the Finnish natural gas pipeline.

A time-varying magnetic field external to the Earth induces telluric currents—electric currents in the conducting ground. These currents create a secondary (internal) magnetic field. As a consequence of Faraday's law of induction, an electric field at the surface of the Earth is induced associated with time variations of the magnetic field. The surface electric field causes electrical currents, known as geomagnetically induced currents, to flow in any conducting structure, such as a power or pipeline grid grounded in the Earth. This electric field, measured in V/km, acts as a voltage source across networks.

Examples of conducting networks are electrical power transmission grids, oil and gas pipelines, non–fiber optic undersea communication cables, non–fiber optic telephone and telegraph networks, and railways. GIC are often described as being quasi direct current (DC), although the variation frequency of GIC is governed by the time variation of the electric field. For GIC to be a hazard to technology, the current has to be of a magnitude and occurrence frequency that makes the equipment susceptible to either immediate or cumulative damage. The size of the GIC in any network is governed by the electrical properties and the topology of the network. The largest magnetospheric-ionospheric current variations, resulting in the largest external magnetic field variations, occur during geomagnetic storms, and it is then that the largest GIC occur. Significant variation periods are typically from seconds to about an hour, so the induction process involves the upper mantle and lithosphere. Since the largest magnetic field variations are observed at higher magnetic latitudes, GIC have been regularly measured in Canadian, Finnish and Scandinavian power grids and pipelines since the 1970s. GIC of tens to hundreds of amperes have been recorded. GIC have also been recorded at mid-latitudes during major storms. There may even be a risk to low-latitude areas, especially during a storm commencing suddenly, because of the high, short-period rate of change of the field that occurs on the day side of the Earth.

GIC were first observed on the emerging electric telegraph network in 1847–1848 during Solar cycle 9. Technological change and the growth of conducting networks have made the significance of GIC greater in modern society. The technical considerations for undersea cables, telephone and telegraph networks and railways are similar. Fewer problems have been reported in the open literature about these systems because efforts have been made to ensure resiliency.

== In power grids ==
Modern electric power transmission systems consist of generating plants inter-connected by electrical circuits that operate at fixed transmission voltages controlled at substations. The grid voltages employed are largely dependent on the path length between these substations and 200–700 kV system voltages are common. There is a trend towards using higher voltages and lower line resistances to reduce transmission losses over longer and longer path lengths. Low line resistances produce a situation favourable to the flow of GIC. Power transformers have a magnetic circuit that is disrupted by the quasi-DC GIC: the field produced by the GIC offsets the operating point of the magnetic circuit and the transformer may go into half-cycle saturation. This produces harmonics in the AC waveform, localised heating and leads to higher reactive power demands, inefficient power transmission and possible mis-operation of protective measures. Balancing the network in such situations requires significant additional reactive power capacity. The magnitude of GIC that will cause significant problems to transformers varies with transformer type. Modern industry practice is to specify GIC tolerance levels on new transformers.

On 13 March 1989, a severe geomagnetic storm caused the collapse of the Hydro-Québec power grid in a matter of seconds as equipment protective relays tripped in a cascading sequence of events. Six million people were left without power for nine hours, with significant economic loss. Since 1989, power companies in North America, the United Kingdom, Northern Europe, and elsewhere have invested in evaluating the GIC risk and in developing mitigation strategies.

GIC risk can, to some extent, be reduced by capacitor blocking systems, maintenance schedule changes, additional on-demand generating capacity, and ultimately, load shedding. These options are expensive and sometimes impractical. The continued growth of high voltage power networks results in higher risk. This is partly due to the increase in the interconnectedness at higher voltages, connections in terms of power transmission to grids in the auroral zone, and grids operating closer to capacity than in the past.

To understand the flow of GIC in power grids and to advise on GIC risk, analysis of the quasi-DC properties of the grid is necessary. This must be coupled with a geophysical model of the Earth that provides the driving surface electric field, determined by combining time-varying ionospheric source fields and a conductivity model of the Earth. Such analyses have been performed for North America, the UK and in Northern Europe. The complexity of power grids, the source ionospheric current systems and the 3D ground conductivity make an accurate analysis difficult. By being able to analyze major storms and their consequences, analysts can build a picture of the weak spots in a transmission system and run hypothetical event scenarios.

Grid management is also aided by space weather forecasts of major geomagnetic storms. This allows for mitigation strategies to be implemented. Solar observations provide a one- to three-day warning of an Earthbound coronal mass ejection (CME), depending on CME speed. Following this, detection of the solar wind shock that precedes the CME in the solar wind, by spacecraft at the L_{1} Lagrangian point, gives a definite 20 to 60 minutes warning of a geomagnetic storm (again depending on local solar wind speed). It takes approximately two to three days after a CME launches from the Sun for a geomagnetic storm to reach Earth and to affect the Earth's geomagnetic field.

== GIC hazard in pipelines ==
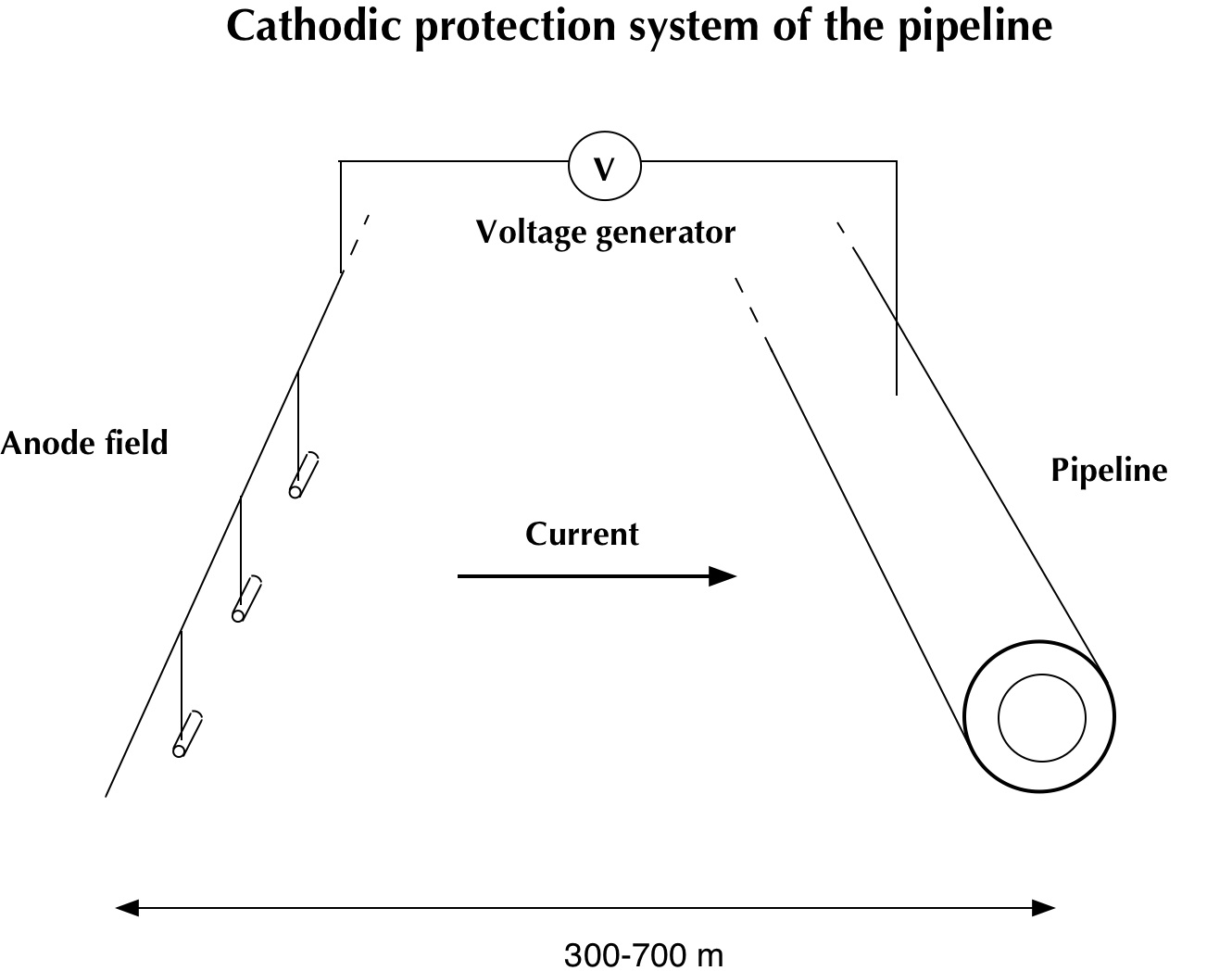
Schematic illustration of the cathodic protection system used to protect pipeline from corrosion.

Major pipeline networks exist at all latitudes and many systems are on a continental scale. Pipeline networks are constructed from steel to contain high-pressure liquid or gas and have corrosion resistant coatings. Damage to the pipeline coating can result in the steel being exposed to the soil or water possibly causing localised corrosion. If the pipeline is buried, cathodic protection is used to minimise corrosion by maintaining the steel at a negative potential with respect to the ground. The operating potential is determined from the electro-chemical properties of the soil and Earth in the vicinity of the pipeline. The GIC hazard to pipelines is that GIC cause swings in the pipe-to-soil potential, increasing the rate of corrosion during major geomagnetic storms. GIC risk is not a risk of catastrophic failure, but a reduced service life of the pipeline.

Pipeline networks are modeled in a similar manner to power grids, for example through distributed source transmission line models that provide the pipe-to-soil potential at any point along the pipe (Boteler, 1997). These models need to consider complicated pipeline topologies, including bends and branches, as well as electrical insulators (or flanges) that electrically isolate different sections. From a detailed knowledge of the pipeline response to GIC, pipeline engineers can understand the behaviour of the cathodic protection system even during a geomagnetic storm, when pipeline surveying and maintenance may be suspended.

== See also ==
- List of solar storms
  - Solar storm of 1859
- Aurora (astronomy)
