= Levantine Iron Age anomaly =

Iron Age geomagnetic anomaly

The Levantine Iron Age anomaly (LIAA) or Levantine Iron Age geomagnetic anomaly was a geomagnetic anomaly which occurred between 1050 and 700 BCE.

Research data shows the Earth’s magnetic field became unusually strong in the Middle East and Mediterranean around 3,000 years ago, with similar strong activity appearing across Europe several hundred years later. Researchers propose that around 950–750 BC, a particularly strong concentration of magnetic activity (sometimes described as a “flux patch”) developed near the core–mantle boundary beneath the Middle East, and slowly moved north and west.

The anomaly was identified and dated via iron oxide grains baked into ancient bricks from Mesopotamia. The names of Mesopotamian kings inscribed into the cuneiform tablets helped scientists determine the dates of the anomaly.

== See also ==
- Geomagnetically induced current
- History of Mesopotamia
- Magnetotellurics
