= Seismoelectrical method =

The seismoelectrical method (which is different from the electroseismic physical principle) is based on the generation of electromagnetic fields in soils and rocks by seismic waves. This technique is still under development and in the future it may have applications like detecting and characterizing fluids in the underground by their electrical properties, among others, usually related to fluids (porosity, transmissivity, physical properties).

== Operation ==
When a seismic wave encounters an interface, it creates a charge separation at the interface forming an electric dipole. This dipole radiates an electromagnetic wave that can be detected by antennae on the ground surface.

As the seismic (P or compression) waves stress earth materials, four geophysical phenomena occur:

1. The resistivity of the earth materials is modulated by the seismic wave;
2. Electrokinetic effects analogous to streaming potentials are created by the seismic wave;
3. Piezoelectric effects are created by the seismic wave; and
4. High-frequency, audio- and high-frequency radio frequency impulsive responses are generated in sulfide minerals (sometimes referred to as RPE).

The dominant application of the electroseismic method is to measure the electrokinetic effect or streaming potential (item 2, above). Electrokinetic effects are initiated by sound waves (typically P-waves) passing through a porous rock inducing relative motion of the rock matrix and fluid. Motion of the ionic fluid through the capillaries in the rock occurs with cations (or less commonly, anions) preferentially adhering to the capillary walls, so that applied pressure and resulting fluid flow relative to the rock matrix produces an electric dipole. In a non-homogeneous formation, the seismic wave generates an oscillating flow of fluid and a corresponding oscillating electrical and EM field. The resulting EM wave can be detected by electrode pairs placed on the ground surface.

However, P-waves moving through a solid that contains some moisture also generates an electric phenomenon called coseismic waves. The coseismic waves travel with P-waves and are not sensitive to electrical properties of the subsurface. The dipole antenna cannot distinguish electrokinetic signal from coseismic signal so it records them both, and coseismic waves must be removed while processing field data to be able to actually interpret electrokinetic effect.

At the moment, there is not a field routine operation method, but in scientific studies an array of several dipole antennas is placed along a straight line to record seismoelectric waves, and an array of geophones placed between dipole antennas to record seismic wave arrivals. Geophones are necessary to be able to suppress coseismic waves from the seismoelectric signal, so that electrokinetic effect can be separated and studied.

== Limitations ==
The electroseismic method is very susceptible to electrical cultural noise, and has also the same noise sources as reflection seismic method, which include ground roll, multiples and random noise. Seismoelectrical method also has a very low signal-to-noise ratio, because the attenuation of electromagnetic waves inside the earth is 1/r^3, thus theoretically limiting its depth of exploration to three hundred meters. Typical electroseismic signals are at the microvolt level. The electroseismic signal is proportional to the pressure of the seismic wave. Thus it is possible to increase the signal by using stronger seismic sources.

The electrokinetic effect is produced by several kinds of contrasts between layers like porosity contrasts, potential contrasts, viscosity contrasts and saturation in fluids contrasts among others. The possible causes of elektronkinetic effect between layers is still now a matter of study. With nowadays knowledge and technology it's really hard to determine without further data (like borehole or other geophysics data from the location), what are electrokinetic conversions produced by, and further studies will have to be carried out to be able to interpret electrokinetic data correctly. Although that, the electrokinetic effect has a promising future in near-surface and borehole geophysics.

== Examples of successful field studies ==
The propagation of seismic waves in porous rocks is associated with a small transient deformation of rock matrix and pore space which can cause electromagnetic fields of observable amplitude if the pores are saturated. Seismoelectric field measurements are expected to help localize permeable layers in porous rocks and provide information about anelastic properties. This theoretical potential for hydrogeological applications, however, is so far confirmed only by a very limited number of successful field studies. As a consequence, the seismoelectric method is still far from being routinely used.

== See also ==
- Seismo-electromagnetics
