= Seismo-electromagnetics =

Electro-magnetic phenomena

Seismo-electromagnetics are various electro-magnetic phenomena believed to be generated by tectonic forces acting on the Earth's crust, and possibly associated with seismic activity such as earthquakes and volcanoes. Study of these has been prompted by the prospect they might be generated by the increased stress leading up to an earthquake, and might thereby provide a basis for short-term earthquake prediction. However, despite many studies, no form of seismo-electromagnetics has been shown to be effective for earthquake prediction. A key problem is that earthquakes themselves produce relatively weak electromagnetic phenomena, and the effects from any precursory phenomena are likely to be too weak to measure. Close monitoring of the Parkfield earthquake revealed no significant pre-seismic electromagnetic effects. However, some researchers remain optimistic, and searches for seismo-electromagnetic earthquake precursors continue.

== VAN method ==
The VAN method – named after P. Varotsos, K. Alexopoulos and K. Nomicos, authors of the 1981 papers describing it – measures low frequency electric signals, termed "seismic electric signals" (SES), by which Varotsos and several colleagues claimed to have successfully predicted earthquakes in Greece. Both the method itself and the manner by which successful predictions were claimed have been severely criticized and debated by VAN, but the critics have not retracted their views.

Since 2001, the VAN group has introduced a concept they call "natural time", applied to the analysis of their precursors. Initially it is applied on SES to distinguish them from noise and relate them to a possible impending earthquake. In case of verification (classification as "SES activity"), natural time analysis is additionally applied to the general subsequent seismicity of the area associated with the SES activity, in order to improve the time parameter of the prediction. The method treats earthquake onset as a critical phenomenon.

After 2006, VAN say that all alarms related to SES activity have been made public by posting at arxiv.org. One such report was posted on Feb. 1, 2008, two weeks before the largest earthquake in Greece during the period 1983–2011. This earthquake occurred on February 14, 2008, with magnitude (M_{w}) 6.9. VAN's report was also described in an article in the newspaper Ethnos on Feb. 10, 2008. However, Gerassimos Papadopolous complained that the VAN reports were confusing and ambiguous, and that "none of the claims for successful VAN predictions is justified", but this complaint was answered on the same issue.

== QuakeFinder and Freund physics ==
In his investigations of crystalline physics, Dr. Friedemann Freund found that water molecules embedded in rock can dissociate into ions if the rock is under intense stress. The resulting charge carriers can generate electrically charged particles under certain conditions. Freund suggested that perhaps these currents could be responsible for earthquake precursors such as electromagnetic radiation, earthquake lights and disturbances of the plasma in the ionosphere. The study of such currents and interactions is known as electromagnetic precursor energy signals or Freund physics.

Most seismologists reject Dr. Freund's theory that stress-generated signals can be detected and put to use as precursors, for three reasons. First, it is theorized that stress does not accumulate rapidly before a major earthquake, and thus there is no reason to expect large currents to be rapidly generated. Secondly, seismologists searched for statistically reliable electrical precursors, using seven field test instruments prior to the 2004 Parkfield earthquake and did not identify any such precursors. And thirdly, it is theorized water in the earth's crust would cause any charged particles to be absorbed before reaching the surface.

QuakeFinder was a company focused on developing a system for deploying magnetic field sensors (magnetometer) with a mission to save lives by forecasting earthquakes. The company operated as an independent company with controlling interest from Stellar Solutions, LLC and included a long-standing research collaboration between Mr. Tom Blier and Dr. Freund. The company deployed a network of sensor stations to detect low-frequency, electromagnetic pulses the team believed might precede major earthquakes. The sensors were reported to have a range of approximately 10 miles (16 km) from the instrument to the source of the pulses. As of 2016, the company reported 125 stations in California, and their research colleague, Dr. Jorge Heraud (Pontifica Universidad Catolica del Peru) reported 10 sites in Peru. Using these sensors, Dr. Heraud published peer-reviewed findings that he had been able to triangulate pulses seen from multiple sites, in order to determine the origin of the pulses. Dr. Heraud reported that the pulses were seen beginning from 11 to 18 days before an impending earthquake, and could be used to determine the location and timing of future seismic events.

However, insofar as a verifiable prediction would require a publicly stated announcement of the location, time, and size of an impending event before its occurrence, neither QuakeFinder nor Dr. Heraud verifiably predicted an earthquake, nor issued multiple predictions of the type that might be objectively testable for statistical significance.

Current research suggests the electrical signatures are produced by dissolved gases that come out of solution when de-pressurized and then ionize.

== Corralitos anomaly ==
In the month prior to the 1989 Loma Prieta earthquake measurements of the Earth's magnetic field at ultra-low frequencies by a magnetometer in Corralitos, California, just 7 km from the epicenter of the impending earthquake, started showing anomalous increases in amplitude. Just three hours before the quake the measurements soared to about thirty times greater than normal, with amplitudes tapering off after the quake. Such amplitudes had not been seen in two years of operation, nor in a similar instrument located 54 km away. To many people such apparent locality in time and space suggested an association with the earthquake.

Additional magnetometers were subsequently deployed across northern and southern California, but after ten years, and several large earthquakes, similar signals have not been observed. More recent studies have cast doubt on the connection, attributing the Corralitos signals to either unrelated magnetic disturbance or, even more simply, to sensor-system malfunction.

Study of the closely monitored 2004 Parkfield earthquake found no evidence of precursory electromagnetic signals of any type.

== ULF magnetic field precursors ==
Two recent studies by Konstantinos Eftaxias and his colleagues examined ULF magnetic fields preceding major earthquakes. At the 2011 Tohoku earthquake, ULF radiation exhibited critical behavior, while at the 2008 Sichuan earthquake, the researchers found a depression of the horizontal ULF magnetic field, which may also be interpreted as a manifestation of criticality.

== TEC variations ==
Professor Kosuke Heki of Hokkaido University in Japan said that he discovered by accident that GPS signals changed about 40 minutes before the 2011 Tohoku-Oki earthquake. Reviewing historical data for other earthquakes, he found that this same correlation occurred during other incidents. He suggested that the GPS signals were detecting variations in the levels of the TEC (total electron content) of the ionosphere in the hour preceding an earthquake.

== Satellite observations ==
The "Detection of Electro-Magnetic Emissions Transmitted from Earthquake Regions" satellite, constructed by CNES, has made observations which show strong correlations between certain types of low frequency electromagnetic activity and the most seismically active zones on the Earth, and have shown a sharp signal in the ionospheric electron density and temperature near southern Japan seven days before a 7.1 magnitude earthquake occurred there (on August 29 and September 5, 2004, respectively).

Quakesat is an earth observation nanosatellite based on 3 CubeSats. It was designed to be a proof-of-concept for collecting extremely low frequency earthquake precursor signals from space. The primary instrument is a magnetometer housed in a 2-foot (0.6 m) telescoping boom. The science behind the concept is disputed.

ESPERIA is an equatorial space mission mainly concerned with detecting any tectonic and preseismic related signals. More in general, it has been proposed for defining the near-Earth electromagnetic, plasma, and particle environment, and for studying perturbations and instabilities in the ionosphere-magnetosphere transition region. To study earthquake preparation processes and anthropogenic impacts in the Earth's surface, a phase A study has been realized for the Italian Space Agency.

The Deformation, Ecosystem Structure and Dynamics of Ice (DESDynI) radar satellite, which was canceled in the White House's 2012 budget proposal, would have the capacity to identify elastic strain in tectonic plates, combining L-band interferometric synthetic aperture radar and a multi-beam infrared lidar to detect strains in the Earth's surface that could lead to serious earthquakes.

Russia and the United Kingdom agreed to jointly deploy two satellites in 2015 that will measure electromagnetic signals that are released from the earth's crust prior to earthquakes. The project is said to be able to "help predict earthquakes and potentially save thousands of lives."

Another site of current research is China, where a satellite launch was planned for 2014, to provide data from ionospheric phenomena for comparison with seismo-electromagnetic phenomena on the ground. Such a link is partially borne out in the current literature, with ionospheric phenomena already shown to precede seismic phenomena by a few hours to days. The network would potentially show whether such ionospheric phenomena are sourced from ground electrical phenomena.

== See also ==
- Electrical resistivity tomography
- Induced polarization
- Magnetometer
- Seismoelectrical method
- Telluric current
- VAN method

== Sources ==
- Apostolidis, C. (2008-02-10), "Problepsi gia seismo 6 rixter", Ethnos (in Greek), Pegasus Publishing, archived from the original on 2016-07-15.
- Campbell, W. H. (May 2009), "Natural magnetic disturbance fields, not precursors, preceding the Loma Prieta earthquake", Journal of Geophysical Research, 114 (A5): A05307, Bibcode:2009JGRA..114.5307C, doi:10.1029/2008JA013932.
- Chouliaras, G (2009), "Seismicity anomalies prior to 8 June 2008 earthquake in Western Greece" (PDF), Nat. Hazards Earth Syst. Sci., 9: 327–335, doi:10.5194/nhess-9-327-2009.
- Enriquez, Alberto (2015), "Earthquake-prediction technology deserves to be taken seriously (OPINION)", OregonLive.com.
- Fraser-Smith, A. C.; Bernardi, A.; McGill, P. R.; Ladd, M. E.; Helliwell, R. A.; Villard, O. G. Jr. (August 1990), "Low-Frequency Magnetic Field Measurements Near the Epicenter of the Ms 7.1 Loma Prieta Earthquake", Geophysical Research Letters, 17 (9): 1465–1468, Bibcode:1990GeoRL..17.1465F, doi:10.1029/GL017i009p01465.
- Freund, Friedemann (2000-05-10), "Time-resolved study of charge generation and propagation in igneous rocks", Journal of Geophysical Research: Solid Earth, 105 (B5): 11001–11019, Bibcode:2000JGR...10511001F, doi:10.1029/1999JB900423, ISSN 2156-2202.
- Geller, Robert J. (December 1997), "Earthquake prediction: a critical review.", Geophysical Journal International, 131 (3): 425–450, Bibcode:1997GeoJI.131..425G, doi:10.1111/j.1365-246X.1997.tb06588.x.
- Heraud, J. A.; Centa, V. A.; Bleier, T. (2015-12-01), "Electromagnetic Precursors Leading to Triangulation of Future Earthquakes and Imaging of the Subduction Zone", AGU Fall Meeting Abstracts, 32, Bibcode:2015AGUFMNH32B..03H.
- Hough, Susan (2010), Predicting the Unpredictable: The Tumultuous Science of Earthquake Prediction, Princeton University Press, ISBN 978-0-691-13816-9.
- Huang, Qinghua (2015-01-27). "Forecasting the epicenter of a future major earthquake". Proceedings of the National Academy of Sciences. 112 (4): 944–945. Bibcode:2015PNAS..112..944H. doi:10.1073/pnas.1423684112. ISSN 0027-8424. PMC 4313830. PMID 25583499.
- International Commission on Earthquake Forecasting for Civil Protection (30 May 2011), "Operational Earthquake Forecasting: State of Knowledge and Guidelines for Utilization", Annals of Geophysics, 54 (4) 2: 315–391, Bibcode:2011AnGp...54.5350J, doi:10.4401/ag-5350, hdl:20.500.11820/6552f865-6e59-47f1-a5ec-b7446bfd1a82
- Johnston, M. J. S.; Sasai, Y.; Egbert, G. D.; Mueller, R. J. (September 2006), "Seismomagnetic Effects from the Long-Awaited 28 September 2004 M 6.0 Parkf1eld Earthquake" (PDF), Bulletin of the Seismological Society of America, 96 (4B): S206–S220, Bibcode:2006BuSSA..96S.206J, doi:10.1785/0120050810.
- Kappler, K. N.; Morrison, H. Frank; Egbert, G. D. (April 2010), "Long((en))term monitoring of ULF electromagnetic fields at Parkfield, California" (PDF), Journal of Geophysical Research, 115 (B4) 2009JB006421, Bibcode:2010JGRB..115.4406K, doi:10.1029/2009JB006421.
- Lighthill, Sir James, ed. (1996), A Critical Review of VAN – Earthquake Prediction from Seismic Electrical Signals, London, UK: World Scientific Publishing Co Pte Ltd, ISBN 978-981-02-2670-1, archived from the original on 2012-05-19
- Mulargia, F.; Gasperini, P. (July 1992), "Analyzing the statistical validity of earthquake precursors. An application to the "VAN" method", Geophysical Journal International, 111 (1): 32–44, Bibcode:1992GeoJI.111...32M, doi:10.1111/j.1365-246x.1992.tb00552.x
- Papadopoulos, Gerassimos A. (4 May 2010), "Comment on "The Prediction of Two Large Earthquakes in Greece"" (PDF), Eos, 91 (18): 162, Bibcode:2010EOSTr..91..162P, doi:10.1029/2010EO180003.
- Park, Stephen K.; Dalrymple, William; Larsen, Jimmy C. (2007), "The 2004 Parkfield earthquake: Test of the electromagnetic precursor hypothesis", Journal of Geophysical Research, 112 (B5) 2005JB004196, Bibcode:2007JGRB..112.5302P, doi:10.1029/2005JB004196.
- Rundle, John B.; Holliday, James R.; Graves, William R.; Turcotte, Donald L.; Tiampo, Kristy F.; Klein, William (2012), "Probabilities for large events in driven threshold systems", Physical Review E, 86 (2) 021106, Bibcode:2012PhRvE..86b1106R, doi:10.1103/PhysRevE.86.021106, PMID 23005722.
- Thomas, J. N.; Love, J. J.; Johnston, M. J. S. (2009), "On the reported magnetic precursor of the 1989 Loma Prieta earthquake", Physics of the Earth and Planetary Interiors, 173 (3–4): 207–215, Bibcode:2009PEPI..173..207T, doi:10.1016/j.pepi.2008.11.014.
- Uyeda, Seiya (2010), "Reply to Comment on "The Prediction of Two Large Earthquakes in Greece"", Eos, 91 (18), John Wiley & Sons: 163, Bibcode:2010EOSTr..91..163U, doi:10.1029/2010EO180004.
- Uyeda, Seiya; Kamogawa, Masashi (2008-09-23). "The Prediction of Two Large Earthquakes in Greece". Eos, Transactions American Geophysical Union. 89 (39): 363. Bibcode:2008EOSTr..89..363U. doi:10.1029/2008EO390002. ISSN 2324-9250.
- Uyeda, S.; Kamogawa, M.; Tanaka, H. (February 2009), "Analysis of electrical activity and seismicity in the natural time domain for the volcanic-seismic swarm activity in 2000 in the Izu Island region, Japan", Journal of Geophysical Research, 114 (B2): B02310, Bibcode:2009JGRB..114.2310U, doi:10.1029/2007JB005332, archived from the original on 2011-06-06
- Varotsos, P. (2006), "What happened before the last five strong earthquakes in Greece", Proc. Jpn. Acad. Ser. B, 82 (2): 86–91, Bibcode:2006PJAB...82...86V, doi:10.2183/pjab.82.86, PMC 4323052, PMID 25792775
- Varotsos, P.; Alexopoulos, K.; Nomicos, K. (1981a), "Seismic electric currents", Proceedings of the Academy of Athens, 56: 277–286
- Varotsos, P.; Alexopoulos, K.; Nomicos, K. (1981b), "Seven-hour precursors to earthquakes determined from telluric currents", Praktika of the Academy of Athens, 56: 417–433
- Varotsos, P.; Alexopoulos, K. (1984-12-01). "Physical properties of the variations of the electric field of the earth preceding earthquakes. II. determination of epicenter and magnitude". Tectonophysics. 110 (1): 99–125. Bibcode:1984Tectp.110...99V. doi:10.1016/0040-1951(84)90060-X.
- Varotsos, P.; Kuhlanek, P. (August 1993), "Preface [to special issue: "Measurements and Theoretical Models of the Earth's Electric Field Variations Related to Earthquakes"]", Tectonophysics, 224 (1–3): vii–viii, Bibcode:1993Tectp.224D...7., doi:10.1016/0040-1951(93)90054-n
- Varotsos, P.; Sarlis, N.; Skordas, E. (2002), "Long-range correlations in the electric signals that precede rupture" (PDF), Physical Review E, 66 (1 Pt 1) 011902, Bibcode:2002PhRvE..66a1902V, doi:10.1103/physreve.66.011902, PMID 12241379
