= Kat Steele =

Professor of Mechanical Engineering

- Born: Colorado, United States

Academic background
- Education: B.S., Engineering, 2007, Colorado School of Mines; MS., Mechanical Engineering, 2009, PhD, Mechanical Engineering, 2012, Stanford University
- Thesis: The dynamics of crouch gait in cerebral palsy (2012)
- Website: steelelab.me.uw.edu

Katherine Muterspaugh Steele is the Albert S. Kobayashi Endowed Professor of Mechanical Engineering at the University of Washington in Seattle, Washington, United States.

== Early life and education ==
Steele was born to two engineers in Colorado. She earned her Bachelor of Science degree from the Colorado School of Mines and her Master's degree and Phd from Stanford University. In 2012, following the publication of her thesis, she received the NIH Interdisciplinary Rehabilitation Engineering Career Development Award.

== Career ==
Upon earning her PhD, Steele joined the department of Mechanical Engineering at the University of Washington (UW) in September 2013. She stated that the number of women in the faculty influenced her decision to join.

As an assistant professor in the department, Steele and Computer Science and Engineering professor Maya Cakmak received an NSF International grant to fund AccessEngineering. She also received the UW's Coulter Translational Research Partnership Program funding for the 2014–15 academic year. AccessEngineering was an initiative to promote the viability of engineering careers towards students with disabilities. The project aimed to make workspaces more accessible to students with disabilities, such as large signage and clear pathways. She also co-published new guidelines to make spaces more available to students with disabilities at UW. In February 2015, Steele sponsored the first Seattle "Handathon," a competition between students at UW, University of Washington Bothell, and Seattle Pacific University to design prosthetic hands.

The following year, Steele continued working with AccessEngineering and other initiatives to create equal opportunities for students with disabilities. Collaborating with researchers from the UW Department of Mechanical Engineering and Gillette Children's Specialty Healthcare, she developed a Walk-DMC (Dynamic Motor Control Index During Walking), a quantitative method to assess the motor control of children with cerebral palsy. Walk-DMC used electromyography data collected from electrodes placed on the skin to evaluate their patient's muscle activity. In a study published in the journal Developmental Medicine & Child Neurology, it was found that Walk-DMC improved a patient's gait, walking speed and function after surgery. She later received the American Society of Biomechanics Young Scientist Award and was promoted to the Albert S. Kobayashi Endowed Professor of Mechanical Engineering.

In 2017, Steele, Kristie Bjornson, and Jessica Zistatsis were awarded the Global Center for Integrated Health of Women, Adolescents, and Children pilot grant worth $30,000 to test PlayGait on children with cerebral palsy. PlayGait is a therapeutic device that is designed to allow children with cerebral palsy to strengthen their legs and increase their mobility. The following year, she received the 2018 UW College of Engineering Team Award as part of the Engineering Innovation in Health teaching team and was promoted to associate professor. During the COVID-19 pandemic, Microsoft announced that they would partner with six UW departments and three different colleges, including Steele, to establish the Center for Research and Education on Accessible Technology.
