= Geomagnetic jerk =

Sudden change in the Earth's magnetic field

In geophysics, a geomagnetic jerk or secular geomagnetic variation impulse is a relatively sudden change in the second derivative of the Earth's magnetic field with respect to time.

These events were noted by Vincent Courtillot and Jean-Louis Le Mouël in 1976. The clearest ones, observed all over the world, happened in 1969, 1978, 1991, and 1999. Data before 1969 is scarcer, but there is evidence of other global jerks in 1901, 1913, and 1925. Other events in 1932, 1949, 1958, 1986, and 2003 were detected only in some parts of the world. These events are believed to originate in the interior of the Earth (rather than being due to external phenomena such as the solar wind); but their precise cause is still a matter of research.

The name "jerk" was borrowed from kinematics, where it means the rate of change of the acceleration of a body, that is, the third derivative of its position with respect to time (the acceleration being the second derivative); or, more specifically, a sudden and momentary spike (or dip) in that rate.

== Description ==
Jerks seem to occur in irregular intervals, on average about once every 10 years. In the period between jerks, each component of the field at a specific location changes with time t approximately as a fixed polynomial of the second degree, A t^{2} + B t + C. Each jerk is a relatively sudden change (spread over a period of a few months to a couple of years) in the A coefficient of this formula, which determines the second derivative; and usually in B and C coefficients as well.

The strength of each jerk varies from location to location, and some jerks are observed only in some regions. For example, the 1949 jerk was clearly observed at Tucson (North America, long. 110.93°), but not at Chambon-la-Forêt (Europe, long. 2.27°). Moreover, the global jerks seem to occur at slightly different times in different regions; often earlier in the Northern hemisphere than in the Southern hemisphere.

== Theories ==
These events are believed to be caused by changes in the flow patterns of the liquid outer core of the Earth, as for instance carried by hydromagnetic waves such as torsional oscillations. Numerical simulations of core dynamics have successfully reproduced the characteristics of well documented jerks. In these simulations, jerks are caused by Alfvén waves emitted inside the outer core and focusing at the core surface. Prior to these explanations there had also been claims that geomagnetic jerks were connected to strong earthquakes.

== See also ==
- Levantine Iron Age Anomaly
