= Electromagnetic Geoservices =

Norwegian geophysical services company

Electromagnetic Geoservices ASA
- Company type: Allmennaksjeselskap
- Traded as: OSE: EMGS
- Industry: Petroleum
- Founded: 1 February 2002
- Headquarters: Trondheim, Norway
- Key people: Bjorn Petter Lindhom (CEO), Eystein Eriksrud (Chair)
- Products: Geophysical services
- Website: www.emgs.com

Electromagnetic Geoservices ASA (EMGS) is a Norwegian geophysical services company using proprietary marine electromagnetic technology to support oil and gas companies in their search for offshore hydrocarbons. The administrative and research headquarters are located in Trondheim.

The company was established on February 1, 2002 by the founders Terje Eidesmo, Ståle Johansen and Svein Ellingsrud. EMGS pioneered marine electromagnetic technology with the first successful application and commercialization of controlled source electro-magnetic surveying technology (CSEM). Marine EM, or CSEM, is an emerging exploration method that uses electromagnetic energy to detect resistive bodies - including hydrocarbon reservoirs - beneath the seabed. The technique used by EMGS was trialled in 1998 using a towed, high-power EM source and a series of seabed receivers, while the founders were working for Statoil.

The company acquires 3D electromagnetic and marine magnetotelluric data, which are used to assess formation resistivity before drilling, and interpret and integrate this information with other geodata to aid exploration decision making. 3D EM data is routinely used for lead generation, prospect ranking and volume assessments.

Main offices and research department are located in Trondheim, Norway. The company was listed on the Oslo Stock Exchange on March 30, 2007. EMGS also hold offices in Oslo, Norway together with Houston, US and Kuala Lumpur in Malaysia.

In 2007, two of the founders of EMGS, Terje Eidesmo and Svein Ellingsrud, were awarded the Virgil Kauffman Gold Medal from the Society of Exploration Geophysicists in recognition of their pioneering work in applying controlled-source electromagnetics to the detection of hydrocarbons.
