= Steven L. Newman =

American businessman

Steven L. Newman (born c. 1964) is an American businessman. He served as the president and chief executive (CEO) of Transocean until February 16, 2015. He was the CEO of the company when its offshore rig in the Gulf of Mexico experienced a catastrophic failure in the Deepwater Horizon incident.

== Biography ==
=== Early life ===
Steven Newman received a Bachelor of Science degree in petroleum engineering from Colorado School of Mines in 1989 and an M.B.A. from the Harvard Business School.

=== Career ===
He joined Transocean in 1994 in the Corporate Planning Department. He became chief operating officer on October 16, 2006. He was executive vice president of performance for 2007–2008. He became president in May 2008 and chief executive officer on March 1, 2010, staying in that role until February 15, 2015.

His tenure as chief executive is defined by the 2010 Deepwater Horizon catastrophe and his response to it, which got generally positive reviews at the time. However, some business analysts attributed Newman’s departure in 2015 to a lack of confidence in his leadership.
