= Curie depth =

In geophysics, the Curie depth is the depth at which rocks in a specific geographical area encounter the Curie temperature. This depth can be approximated from aeromagnetic survey data through spectral analysis or forward modeling. It is thought that the subduction of structures can alter the Curie depth of Earth's crust in the surrounding region. Example of this is the subduction of the Juan Fernández Ridge under north-central Chile, a chain of extinct volcanoes on the Nazca Plate which depresses the Curie depth to 39 km northeast of Valparaíso compared with Curie depth ranges from 12 km in the area of Ovalle and Illapel further north.
