= Magnetotellurics =

Electromagnetic geophysical technique

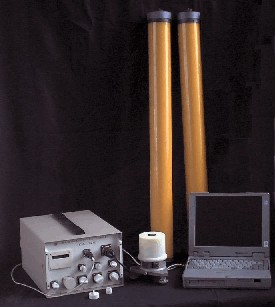
Magnetotelluric station

Magnetotellurics (MT) is an electromagnetic geophysical method for inferring the Earth's subsurface electrical conductivity from measurements of natural geomagnetic and geoelectric field variation at the Earth's surface.

Investigation depth ranges from 100 m below ground by recording higher frequencies down to 200 km or deeper with long-period soundings. Proposed in Japan in the 1940s, and France and the USSR during the early 1950s, MT is now an international academic discipline and is used in exploration surveys around the world.

Commercial uses include hydrocarbon (oil and gas) exploration, geothermal exploration, carbon sequestration, mining exploration, as well as hydrocarbon and groundwater monitoring. Research applications include experimentation to further develop the MT technique, long-period deep crustal exploration, deep mantle probing, sub-glacial water flow mapping, and earthquake precursor research.

== History ==
The magnetotelluric technique was introduced independently by Japanese scientists in 1948 (Hirayama, Rikitake), Soviet geophysicist Andrey Nikolayevich Tikhonov in 1950 and the French geophysicist Louis Cagniard in 1953. With advances in instrumentation, processing and modelling, magnetotellurics has become one of the most important tools in deep Earth research.

Since first being created in the 1950s, magnetotelluric sensors, receivers and data processing techniques have followed the general trends in electronics, becoming less expensive and more capable with each generation. Major advances in MT instrumentation and technique include the shift from analog to digital hardware, the advent of remote referencing, GPS time-based synchronization, and 3D data acquisition and processing.

== Commercial applications ==
=== Hydrocarbon exploration ===
For hydrocarbon exploration, MT is mainly used as a complement to the primary technique of reflection seismology exploration. While seismic imaging is able to image subsurface structure, it cannot detect the changes in resistivity associated with hydrocarbons and hydrocarbon-bearing formations. MT does detect resistivity variations in subsurface structures, which can differentiate between structures bearing hydrocarbons and those that do not.

At a basic level of interpretation, resistivity is correlated with different rock types. High-velocity layers are typically highly resistive, whereas sediments – porous and permeable – are typically much less resistive. While high-velocity layers are an acoustic barrier and make seismic ineffective, their electrical resistivity means the magnetic signal passes through almost unimpeded. This allows MT to see deep beneath these acoustic barrier layers, complementing the seismic data and assisting interpretation. 3-D MT survey results in Uzbekistan (32 x 32 grid of soundings) have guided further seismic mapping of a large known gas-bearing formation with complex subsurface geology.

China National Petroleum Corporation (CNPC) and Nord-West Ltd use onshore MT more than any other oil company in the world, conducting thousands of MT soundings for hydrocarbon exploration and mapping throughout the globe.

=== Mining exploration ===
MT is used for various base metals (e.g. nickel) and precious metals exploration, as well as for kimberlite mapping.

INCO's 1991 proof-of-concept study in Sudbury, Ontario, Canada sensed a 1750-meter-deep nickel deposit. Falconbridge followed with a feasibility study in 1996 that accurately located two Ni-Cu mineralized zones at about 800 m and 1350 m depth. Since then, both major and junior mining companies are increasingly using MT and audio-magnetotellurics (AMT) for both brownfields (near known deposits) and greenfields (uncharted land) exploration. Significant MT mapping work has been done on areas of the Canadian Shield.

Diamond exploration, by detecting kimberlites, is also a proven application.

=== Geothermal exploration ===
MT geothermal exploration measurements allow detection of resistivity anomalies associated with productive geothermal structures, including faults and the presence of a cap rock, and allow for estimation of geothermal reservoir temperatures at various depths. Dozens of MT geothermal exploration surveys have been completed in Japan and the Philippines since the early 1980s, helping to identify several hundred megawatts of renewable power at places such as the Hatchobaru plant on Kyushu and the Togonang plant on Leyte. Geothermal exploration with MT has also been done extensively in the United States, Iceland, New Zealand, Hungary, China, Ethiopia, Indonesia, Peru, Australia, and India.

=== Other ===
MT is also used for groundwater exploration and mapping research, hydrocarbon reservoir monitoring, deep investigation (100 km) of the electrical properties of the bedrock for high-voltage direct current (HVDC) transmission systems, carbon dioxide sequestration, and other environmental engineering applications (e.g. nuclear blast site monitoring and nuclear waste disposal site monitoring).

== Research applications ==
=== Crust and mantle ===
Since the MT is highly sensitive to the composition and temperature of the Earth, it has been widely used to understand numerous geological phenomena in the Earth's mantle and crust. These include investigating the composition and distribution of melts, understanding fault mechanics and earthquake generation, imaging deep lithospheric architecture and composition, which can be tied to many geodynamic processes. Large investigations have focused on the conterminous US (e.g. the National Science Foundation EarthScope MT Program and its successor NASA and USGS MTArray), the East Pacific Rise, Australia (AusLAMP MT Program), Southern Africa (SAMTEX MT Project), China (Part of the Sinoprobe project) and the Tibetan Plateau.

=== Earthquake precursor prediction ===
Fluctuations in the MT signal may be able to predict the onset of seismic events. Stationary MT monitoring systems have been installed in Japan since April 1996, providing a continuous recording of MT signals at the Wakuya Station (previously at the Mizusawa Geodetic Observatory) and the Esashi Station of the Geographical Survey Institute of Japan (GSIJ). These stations measure fluctuations in the Earth's electromagnetic field that correspond with seismic activity. The raw geophysical time-series data from these monitoring stations is freely available to the scientific community, enabling further study of the interaction between electromagnetic events and earthquake activity.

Additional MT earthquake precursor monitoring stations in Japan are located in Kagoshima, in Sawauchi, and on Shikoku. Similar stations are also deployed in Taiwan on Penghu Island, as well as in the Fushan Reserve on the island of Taiwan proper.

POLARIS is a Canadian research program investigating the structure and dynamics of the Earth's lithosphere and the prediction of earthquake ground motion.

== Theory and practice ==
=== Energy sources ===
Solar energy and lightning cause natural variations in the Earth's magnetic field, inducing electric currents (known as telluric currents) under the Earth's surface.

Different rocks, sediments and geological structures have a wide range of different electrical conductivities. Measuring electrical resistivity allows different materials and structures to be distinguished from one another and can improve knowledge of tectonic processes and geologic structures.

The Earth's naturally varying electric and magnetic fields are measured over a wide range of magnetotelluric frequencies from 10,000 Hz to 0.0001 Hz (10,000 s). These fields are due to electric currents flowing in the Earth and the magnetic fields that induce these currents. The magnetic fields are produced mainly by the interaction between the solar wind and the magnetosphere. In addition, worldwide thunderstorm activity causes magnetic fields at frequencies above 1 Hz. Combined, these natural phenomena create strong MT source signals over the entire frequency spectrum.

The ratio of the electric field to magnetic field provides simple information about subsurface conductivity. Because the skin effect phenomenon affects the electromagnetic fields, the ratio at higher frequency ranges gives information on the shallow Earth, whereas deeper information is provided by the low-frequency range. The ratio is usually represented as both apparent resistivity as a function of frequency and phase as a function of frequency.

A subsurface resistivity model is then created using this tensor.

=== Depth and resolution ===
MT measurements can investigate depths from about 300 m down to hundreds of kilometers, though investigations in the range of 500 m to 10,000 m are typical. Greater depth requires measuring lower frequencies, which in turn requires longer recording times. Very deep, very long-period measurements (mid-crust through upper mantle depths), may require recordings of several days to weeks or more to obtain satisfactory data quality.

Horizontal resolution of MT mainly depends on the distance between sounding locations- closer sounding locations increase the horizontal resolution. Continuous profiling (known as Emap) has been used, with only meters between the edges of each telluric dipole.

Vertical resolution of MT mainly depends on the frequency being measured, as lower frequencies have greater depths of penetration. Accordingly, vertical resolution decreases as depth of investigation increases.

=== Signal strength and recording times ===
Magnetic fields in the frequency range of 1 Hz to approximately 20 kHz are part of the audio-magnetotelluric (AMT) range. These are parallel to the Earth surface and move towards the Earth's centre. This large frequency band allows for a range of depth penetration from several metres to several kilometres below the Earth's surface. Due to the nature of magnetotelluric source, the waves generally fluctuate in amplitude height. Long recording times are needed to ascertain usable reading due to the fluctuations and the low signal strength. Generally, the signal is weak between 1 and 5 kHz, which is a crucial range in detecting the top 100 m of geology. The magnetotelluric method is also used in marine environments for hydrocarbon exploration and lithospheric studies. Due to the screening effect of the electrically conductive sea water, a usable upper limit of the spectrum is around 1 Hz.

=== 2D and 3D magnetotellurics ===
Two-dimensional surveys consist of a longitudinal profile of MT soundings over the area of interest, providing two-dimensional "slices" of subsurface resistivity.

Three-dimensional surveys consist of a loose grid pattern of MT soundings over the area of interest, providing a more sophisticated three-dimensional model of subsurface resistivity.

== Variants ==
=== Audio-magnetotellurics ===
Audio-magnetotellurics (AMT) is a higher-frequency magnetotelluric technique for shallower investigations. While AMT has less depth penetration than MT, AMT measurements often take only about one hour to perform (but deep AMT measurements during low-signal strength periods may take up to 24 hours) and use smaller and lighter magnetic sensors. Transient AMT is an AMT variant that records only temporarily during periods of more intense natural signal (transient impulses), improving signal-to-noise-ratio at the expense of strong linear polarization.

=== Controlled source electromagnetics ===
CSEM controlled source electro-magnetic is a deep-water offshore variant of controlled source audio magnetotellurics; CSEM is the name used in the offshore oil and gas industry. and for onshore exploration mostly Lotem is used in Russia, China the US and Europe

Onshore CSEM / CSAMT may be effective where electromagnetic cultural noise (e.g. power lines, electric fences) present interference problems for natural-source geophysical methods. An extensive grounded wire (2 km or more) has currents at a range of frequencies (0.1 Hz to 100 kHz) passed through it. The electric field parallel to the source and the magnetic field which is at right angles are measured. The resistivity is then calculated, and the lower the resistivity, the more likely there is a conductive target (graphite, nickel ore or iron ore). CSAMT is also known in the oil and gas industry as onshore controlled source electromagnetics (Onshore CSEM).

An offshore variant of MT, the marine magnetotelluric (MMT) method, uses instruments and sensors in pressure housings deployed by ship into shallow coastal areas where water is less than 300 m deep. A derivative of MMT is offshore single-channel measurement of the vertical magnetic field only (the Hz, or "tipper"), which eliminates the need for telluric measurements and horizontal magnetic measurements.

== Exploration surveys ==
MT exploration surveys are done to acquire resistivity data which can be interpreted to create a model of the subsurface. Data is acquired at each sounding location for a period of time (overnight soundings are common), with physical spacing between soundings dependent on the target size and geometry, local terrain constraints and financial cost. Reconnaissance surveys can have spacings of several kilometres, while more detailed work can have 200 m spacings, or even adjacent soundings (dipole-to-dipole).

The HSE impact of MT exploration is relatively low because of light-weight equipment, natural signal sources, and reduced hazards compared to other types of exploration (e.g. no drills, no explosives, and no high currents).

=== Remote reference soundings ===
Remote reference is an MT technique used to account for cultural electrical noise by acquiring simultaneous data at more than one MT station. This greatly improves data quality, and may allow acquisition in areas where the natural MT signal is difficult to detect because of man-made EM interference.

=== Equipment ===
A typical full suite of MT equipment (for a "five component" sounding) consists of a receiver instrument with five sensors: three magnetic sensors (typically induction coil sensors), and two telluric (electric) sensors. For exclusively long-period MT (frequencies below approximately 0.1 Hz), the three discrete broadband magnetic field sensors may be substituted by a single compact triaxial fluxgate magnetometer. In many situations, only the telluric sensors will be used, and magnetic data borrowed from other nearby soundings to reduce acquisition costs.

A complete five-component set of MT equipment can be backpack-carried by a small field team (2 to 4 persons) or carried by a light helicopter, allowing deployment in remote and rugged areas. Most MT equipment is capable of reliable operation over a wide range of environmental conditions, with ratings of typically −25 °C to +55 °C, from dry desert to high-humidity (condensing) and temporary full immersion.

=== Data processing and interpretation ===
Post-acquisition processing is required to transform raw time-series data into frequency-based inversions. The resulting output of the processing program is used as the input for subsequent interpretation. Processing may include the use of remote reference data or local data only.

Processed MT data is modelled using various techniques to create a subsurface resistivity map, with lower frequencies generally corresponding to greater depth below ground. Anomalies such as faults, hydrocarbons, and conductive mineralization appear as areas of higher or lower resistivity from surrounding structures. Various software packages are used for interpretation (inversion) of magnetotelluric data, where apparent resistivity is used to create a model of the subsurface.

== Instrument and sensor manufacturers ==
Four companies supply most of the commercial-use world market: one in the United States (Zonge International, Inc.), one in Canada; (Phoenix Geophysics, Ltd.); one in Germany (Metronix Messgeraete und Elektronik GmbH).) and one in Russia (Vega Geophysics, LLC). Emerging manufacturers of low-cost, internet-enabled long-period and ultrawideband instruments include IoMT in the United States (IoMT LLC).

Government agencies and smaller companies producing MT instrumentation for internal use include the Russian Academy of Sciences (SPbF IZMIRAN); and the National Space Research Institute of Ukraine.

== See also ==
- Electrical resistivity tomography, another geophysical technique of imaging
- Exploration geophysics, a branch of geophysics for discovering and mapping mineral resources
- Geophysics
- Geophysical imaging
- Geothermal exploration
- Reflection seismology
- Seismo-electromagnetics
- Transient electromagnetics
