= Ethnos (newspaper) =

Greek newspaper

- Type: Daily newspaper
- Publisher: Dimera Media Investments
- Editor-in-chief: Panagiotis Velissaris, Paschalis Gaganis, Kiriaki Axioti
- Founded: October 26, 1913; 112 years ago
- Ceased publication: July 31, 2019; 6 years ago
- Political alignment: centre-left
- Language: Greek
- City: Athens
- Country: Greece
- Sister newspapers: Ethnos Sunday Edition
- Website: www.ethnos.gr

Ethnos (Greek: Έθνος, lit. '"The Nation"') is a Greek weekly newspaper first published in 1913.

== History ==
The newspaper was first published in 1913 with a Venizelist political thesis. Always in the progressive political spectrum, it supported later Georgios Papandreou and Center Union. In 1970, during the Greek military junta of 1967-74, it was forced to stop publishing. In 1981, Dimitris Varos relaunched it as a colour tabloid.

The newspaper was owned for years by Pegasus Publishing SA. In 2017 was sold to Dimera Media Investments, owned by Ivan Savvidis. From September 2017 to March 2018 publisher was Dimitris Maris. Dimera reportedly acquired the two Ethnos titles (daily and Sunday editions) for 3 million euros.

On August 9, 2020, the Sunday edition ceased circulation following the daily edition which stopped circulating on July 31, 2019.

The publication continued online, with unique content, and more than 150 daily news reports, opinions, and deep analytical articles. In March 2020, 7,348,731 unique users visited the website, placing "Ethnos.gr" in the top ten of most popular news websites in Greece.
