= Alexander A. Kaufman =

Russian geophysicist and professor

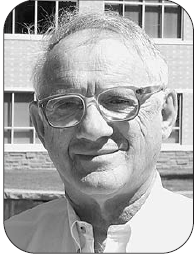
- Born: Alexander Arkadyevich Kaufman; August 1, 1931; Moscow, USSR
- Died: June 7, 2023 (aged 91); California, USA
- Citizenship: USSR → USA
- Education: MGRI
- Known for: Geophysicist, Founder of the Siberian School of Geoelectrics
- Awards: Fedynsky Medal; Honorary Member of SEG; Best Paper in Geophysics
- Scientific career
- Fields: Geophysics
- Workplaces: MGRI; IGG; CSM
- Doctoral advisor: Lev Moiseevich Alpin

Alexander Arkadyevich Kaufman (1 August 1931 – 7 June 2023) was a geophysicist and professor whose work in surface, borehole, and deep electromagnetic sounding was recognized in exploration geophysics. Kaufman directed the Laboratory of Electromagnetic Fields at the Trofimuk Institute of Petroleum-Gas Geology and Geophysics (IGG) and served as head of the Department of Geophysics at Novosibirsk State University (NSU). He taught at the Colorado School of Mines (CSM), where he held a 28-year professorship. He authored and co-authored 14 monographs during his U.S. career published by Elsevier and Academic Press, along with numerous scientific papers, and held a United States patent. He was an Honorary Member of the Society of Exploration Geophysicists.

== Biography ==
Kaufman was born on 1 August 1931 in Moscow, Russian SFSR, Soviet Union. He graduated from the Geophysical Faculty of the Russian State Geological Prospecting University (MGRI) in 1954 and began working in the research division of MGRI. He earned his Candidate of Sciences degree in 1959 and his Doctor of Technical Sciences degree in 1965. He was awarded the title of professor in 1969.

In 1975 Kaufman left the USSR and later worked in Toronto, Canada, at Scintrex Ltd. and later as a consultant for Geonics Ltd.

In 1977 he moved to the United States and began teaching geophysics at the Colorado School of Mines in Golden, Colorado.

Kaufman initiated the GEOFIZIK Charity Fund to support Russian scientists in need of medical assistance.

=== Family ===
Kaufman was married to his first wife, Irina, for 56 years until her death. He was survived by his second wife, Natalie, and his son from his first marriage, Dmitry.

== Research ==
Kaufman worked on the theoretical foundations of electrical prospecting and well logging. His work addressed direct electromagnetic (EM) field problems in complex media, compared frequency-domain and transient approaches and led to the development of practical EM techniques.

Kaufman developed the near-field transient electromagnetic sounding method (ZSBZ), also known as time-domain electromagnetics (TDEM). The method enabled deep geoelectrical surveys using compact equipment and short transmitter-receiver separations. The method was used in oil exploration on the Siberian Platform and in searches for deep ore deposits in Krasnoyarsk Krai, Yakutia, and the Altai region.

Kaufman extended the concept of using the second derivative of the electric field potential to determine formation conductivity through casing. He introduced a calibration procedure to account for variations in casing conductivity. His patented solution has been used for fluid tracking and reservoir management.

He also contributed to the development of transient and induction logging. In the book Theory of Inductive Prospecting, he described the dual-frequency modification method (FDEM), which combined features of both frequency and time-domain approaches. The FDEM was later developed into a logging technique capable of measuring formation conductivity and electrical anisotropy.

In the monograph Principles of Dielectric Logging Theory (2021), Kaufman presented a theoretical foundation for dielectric logging from first principles to instrument design.

Kaufman also authored the multi-volume series Geophysical Field Theory and Method (1992–1994), which provides a unified theoretical treatment of gravitational, magnetic, electric, and electromagnetic fields in geophysical applications. The work received independent evaluation in Geophysical Journal International, where Prof. Mark N. Berdichevsky described Kaufman as "a renowned expert in geophysics," stating that he knew of "no other book in geophysical literature where the philosophy of modern geophysics is presented with such clarity, comprehensiveness and pedagogical skill" and that the monograph "makes a valuable contribution to the geophysical literature" and serves effectively as both a textbook and a reference work.

== Scientific school and teaching ==
Between 1965 and 1974, Kaufman led the Laboratory of Electromagnetic Fields at the Institute of Petroleum-Gas Geology and Geophysics (IGG) and headed the Department of Geophysics at Novosibirsk State University. According to an obituary in SPWLA Today, the laboratory trained several generations of researchers in electromagnetic well logging and geophysics.

He supervised PhD students and early-career researchers in electromagnetic geophysics. Kaufman taught at Novosibirsk State University from 1963 to 1974 and from 1977 to 2004 he taught at the Colorado School of Mines, where he offered undergraduate courses in electromagnetism, geophysical exploration, and electrical prospecting.

== Awards and honors ==
- Fedynsky Medal for outstanding contributions to geophysics (1997).
- SEG Honorable Mention for best paper in Geophysics (1990).
- Honorary Member of the Society of Exploration Geophysicists (2004).

== Selected publications ==
Monographs

According to SPWLA, 14 of his books were written during his years in the United States.

- Kaufman, A. A.; Keller, G. V. The Magnetotelluric Sounding Method. Elsevier, 1981. ISBN 978-0-44-441863-0.
- Kaufman, A. A.; Hansen, R. O. Principles of the Gravitational Method. Elsevier, 2007. ISBN 978-0-444-52993-0.
- Kaufman, A. A.; Hansen, R. O.; Kleinberg, R. L. Principles of the Magnetic Methods in Geophysics. Elsevier, 2007. ISBN 978-0-444-52995-4.
- Kaufman, A. A.; Levshin, A. L.; Larner, K. L. Acoustic and Elastic Wave Fields in Geophysics. Elsevier, 2000. ISBN 978-0-44-450336-7.
- Kaufman, A. A.; Anderson, B. I. Principles of Electric Methods in Surface and Borehole Geophysics. Elsevier, 2016. ISBN 978-0-444-52994-7.
- Kaufman, A. A.; Donadille, J.-M. Principles of Dielectric Logging Theory. Elsevier, 2021. ISBN 978-0-12-822284-3.
- Kaufman, A. A. Geophysical Field Theory and Method. Academic Press, 1992. ISBN 978-0-12-402041-2.

Articles

- Kaufman, A. A.; Levshin, A. L.; Larner, Ken (2004). "The role of wave propagation in the motion of an elastic body". European Journal of Physics. 25 (2): 257–268. Bibcode:2004EJPh...25..257K. doi:10.1088/0143-0807/25/2/012.
- Kaufman, A. A. (1985). "Tutorial Distribution of Alternating Electrical Charges in a Conducting Medium". Geophysical Prospecting. 33 (2): 171–184. Bibcode:1985GeopP..33..171K. doi:10.1111/j.1365-2478.1985.tb00427.x.
- Kaufman, A. (1978). "Frequency and transient responses of electromagnetic fields created by currents in confined conductors". Geophysics. 43 (5): 1002–1010. Bibcode:1978Geop...43.1002K. doi:10.1190/1.1440861.
- Kaufman, A. A. (1979). "Harmonic and transient fields on the surface of a two-layer medium". Geophysics. 44 (7): 1208–1217. Bibcode:1979Geop...44.1208K. doi:10.1190/1.1441003.
- Wait, James R. (1994). "On: "The electrical field in a borehole with a casing," by A. A. Kaufman (January 1990 Geophysics, 55, p. 29-38) and "A transmission line model for electrical logging through casing," by A. A. Kaufman and W. E. Wightman (December 1993 Geophysics, 58, p. 1739–1747); discussion". Geophysics. 59 (5): 850–851. doi:10.1190/1.1443643.
