= Controlled source electro-magnetic =

The controlled source electromagnetic (CSEM) method, also called sea bed logging, is a mostly offshore geophysical technique, employing electromagnetic remote-sensing technology to map the electric resistivity distribution of the subsurface. The electrical resistivity helps to discriminate between different types of rocks. CSEM is mostly used to indicate the presence and extent of hydrocarbon below the seabed.

The CSEM survey uses a dipole source that is towed just above the seafloor to transmit a time-varying electromagnetic field into the earth. This field is modified by the presence of subsurface resistive layers and these changes are detected and logged by an array of receivers placed on the seabed. Because hydrocarbon-bearing formations are highly resistive compared with surrounding formations, a CSEM survey can indicate the presence of oil and gas in offshore situations.

== See also ==
- Exploration geophysics
- Electromagnetic Geoservices ASA
- WesternGeco
- List of oilfield service companies
