= Jeanne Hardebeck =

American seismologist

Jeanne L. Hardebeck
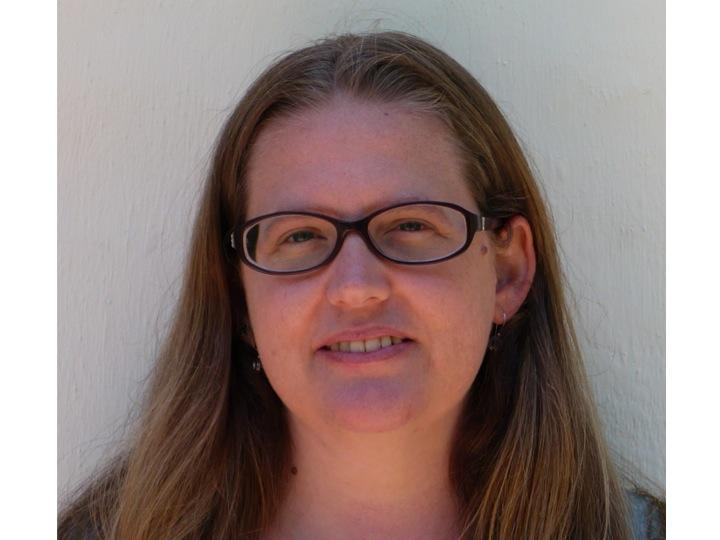
- undated image of Jeanne Hardebeck
- Education: Ph.D in Geophysics, Caltech 2001
- Occupation: Research Geophysicist
- Employer: United States Geological Survey
- Notable work: The Tectonic History of the Tasman Sea: A Puzzle with 13 Pieces A New Method for Determining First-Motion Focal Mechanisms The Static Stress Change Triggering Model: Constraints from Two Southern California Aftershock Sequences Implications for prediction and hazard assessment from the 2004 Parkfield earthquake
- Awards: Charles F Richter Early Career Award, 2006 James B Macelwane Medal, 2007 Presidential Early Career Award for Scientists and Engineers, 2009

Jeanne L. Hardebeck is an American research geophysicist studying earthquakes and seismology who has worked at the United States Geological Survey (USGS) since 2004. Hardebeck studies the state of stress and the strength of faults.

== Education and career ==
Hardebeck received her B.A. in computer science from Cornell University in 1993. She went on to receive her M.S. in Geophysics from the California Institute of Technology (Caltech) in 1997 and her Ph.D in Geophysics from Caltech in 2001. Between 1994 and 2000, Hardebeck served as a Graduate Research Assistant at Caltech for her advisor, Egill Hauksson. After receiving her Ph.D., she served as a Green Postdoctoral Scholar for the Scripps Institution of Oceanography at U.C. San Diego (2000 and 2003). She was a Mendenhall Postdoctoral Scholar for the USGS Earthquakes Hazard Team (2003 and 2004), collaborating with Andrew Michael. She started as a Research Geophysicist for the USGS Earthquakes Hazard Team in 2004.

== Research ==
Hardebeck's area of research focuses around crustal stress and the strength of faults, earthquake statistics, and the testing of earthquake forecasting methods. Her research is noted for the clarity it provides on issues such as the strength of faults and the state of stress that were previously clouded by assumptions and unreliable data. Her investigative methods have been practiced by other experts in the seismic community and she has kept a continual focus on data when developing new methods to infer the state of stress of seismogenic processes. Hardebeck has collaborated with other experts in her field to publish research articles which, since September 2020, have been cited over 5,000 times on Google Scholar. One of her most cited papers, titled "The Tectonic History of the Tasman Sea: A Puzzle with 13 Pieces," analyzed tectonic events in the Tasman Sea and determined its tectonic evolution. Using this information, Hardebeck looked back upon the opening stages of the Tasman Sea and described the dispersal of its tectonic elements at the time. Another of her highly cited papers, titled "A New Method for Determining First-Motion Focal Mechanisms," introduced a method that takes into consideration potential mistakes in the assumed earthquake location and seismic-velocity model when determining earthquake focal mechanisms.

=== Notable publications ===
- The Tectonic History of the Tasman Sea: A Puzzle with 13 Pieces
- A New Method for Determining First-Motion Focal Mechanisms
- The Static Stress Change Triggering Model: Constraints from Two Southern California Aftershock Sequences
- Implications for prediction and hazard assessment from the 2004 Parkfield earthquake

== Awards and recognition ==
- 2006 recipient of the Charles F. Richter Early Career Award
- 2007 recipient of James B Macelwane Medal
- 2009 recipient of the Presidential Early Career Award for Scientists and Engineers
