= Statistical seismology =

Statistical seismology is a subfield of seismology that applies rigorous statistical methods and stochastic modeling to earthquake science. The methodological approach in statistical seismology is a top-down approach that typically ignores the specific physical mechanisms of a single earthquake occurrence and focuses on trends in bulk earthquake occurrence.

Foundational ideas were shaped by early empirical discoveries like the Gutenberg-Richter magnitude-frequency law and Omori's law of aftershock decay. The statistical approach to earthquake occurrence has crystallized into a sub-field of its own by the works Ogata, Vere-Jones, Kagan and others.

Statistical seismology explains earthquake occurrence by analyzing the multidimensional distribution of events in time, space, size, and focal mechanism orientation. The purpose of this subfield is to reveal and analyze statistical trends in earthquake occurrence to improve understanding of earthquake generation mechanisms and improve earthquake prediction and forecasting tasks.

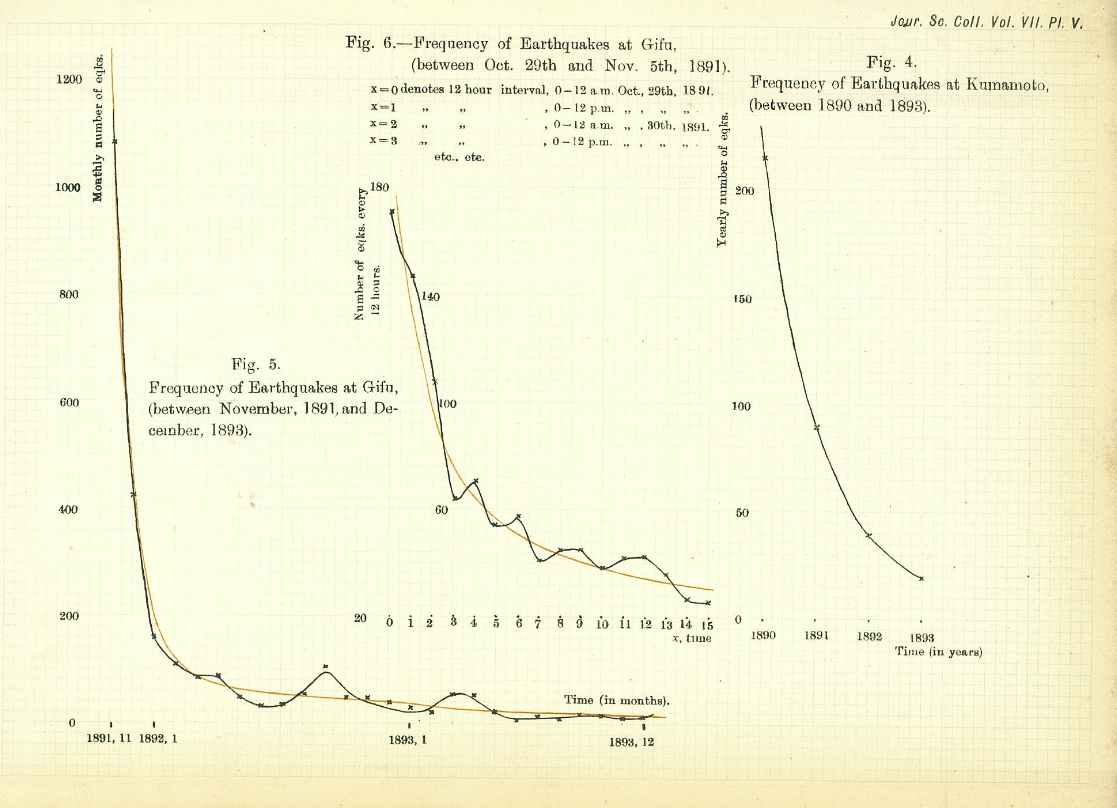
An early example of statistical seismology from Fusakichi Omori's 1894 study. The smooth curves fitted to the frequency data represent the first mathematical formulation of aftershock decay (Omori's Law).

== History ==
The roots of statistical seismology lie in late 19th-century attempts to identify empirical patterns in bulk earthquake behavior. In 1884, Gilbert proposed an early hypothesis that large earthquake occurrences were quasi-periodic, suggesting that once accumulated force is spent, it takes generations for the stress to manifest again. This was followed by Omori’s 1894 seminal study on aftershocks, establishing Omori’s law by demonstrating that their temporal occurrence rate decays inversely with time. By 1935, Wood and Gutenberg defined a crucial paradigm shift, distinguishing between "earthquake prediction," which target specific times and locations within narrow limits, and "earthquake forecasting," which evaluates the overall occurrence rate or probabilities. The discovery of fundamental power-laws continued with Ishimoto and Iida in 1939 and later with Gutenberg and Richter in 1944, whose landmark Gutenberg-Richter relation established that the number of earthquakes increases according to a power-law as their sizes decrease. In the late 20th century, the concept of self-organized criticality (SOC) and models like the OFC model provided a new theoretical framework, suggesting that the Earth's crust is a complex system that naturally maintains itself near a critical state, producing the fractal, scale-invariant patterns observed in seismicity.

The rise of stochastic point processes in the 1970s transitioned the field toward modern, rigorous modeling. In 1970 Vere-Jones provided one of the first major applications of stochastic point process theory to earthquake occurrence, followed by Kagan, 1973, who proposed the theoretical foundations for quantitative forecasts based on multidimensional processes. In 1974 Gardner and Knopoff introduced a widely used declustering algorithm, creating a standard preliminary step for separating independent mainshocks from dependent aftershocks. These developments culminated in 1988 by Ogata's Epidemic Type Aftershock Sequence (ETAS) model, which became the standard for testing seismic hypotheses by treating every earthquake as a potential trigger for future events. This era eventually led to operational earthquake forecasting (OEF). The USGS moved these models into practice through the STEP model in 2005 for real-time automated probability maps and the UCERF3-ETAS in 2013, which integrated history-dependent triggering into California's standards. Since 2018, the USGS has issued automated public aftershock forecasts for above magnitude of 5.0 events. Simultaneously, New Zealand's GNS became a global leader by applying the EEPAS model for medium-term forecasting, containerizing advanced point process pipelines for automated operational use.

== Research topics ==
=== Earthquake prediction ===
In 1935, Wood and Gutenberg defined earthquake prediction as the specification of the region, time, and magnitude of an impending shock within "narrow limits". For several decades, the pursuit of deterministic prediction, identifying a specific event before it occurs, was a primary objective of seismology. This period was characterized by optimism regarding the identification of reliable precursors. However, the failure of high-profile experiments, most notably the Parkfield prediction experiment, led to a re-evaluation of the field's feasibility.

==== The predictability debate ====
A significant scientific debate regarding the inherent possibility of prediction emerged in the late 1990s, centered largely on discussions in the journals Science and Nature. One faction of researchers argued that earthquakes are fundamentally unpredictable. This perspective is based on the theory that the Earth's crust exists in a self-organized critical (SOC) state. Under SOC, any small earthquake has a non-zero probability of cascading into a large event; consequently, the final magnitude of a rupture cannot be determined until the process is complete.

Conversely, other scientists argued that the inability to predict earthquakes stems from insufficient observational data and an incomplete understanding of stress levels in the crust, rather than a fundamental physical law. They maintained that while deterministic prediction is currently unattainable, labeling it "impossible" is scientifically premature.

=== Probabilistic forecasting and rate prediction ===
During the late 1990s earthquake predictability served as a focal point for the argument that deterministic prediction, identifying the specific time, place, and magnitude of an event, is an unrealistic scientific goal. During these discussions and in subsequent publications, critics such as Geller, Kagan and Sornette compared the search for reliable short-term precursors to a "modern form of alchemy."

Modern seismology has largely transitioned from seeking "alchemy-like" deterministic precursors to developing probabilistic earthquake forecasting. This approach treats seismogenesis as a non-random but complex process, moving the goal from pinpointing individual shocks to quantifying regional seismic risk.

=== Operational earthquake forecasting, testing, and standards ===
Operational Earthquake Forecasting (OEF) is the process of regularly disseminating authoritative, time-dependent information regarding earthquake probabilities and hazards to aid the public and government agencies in disaster preparedness. Currently, OEF systems or operational procedures have been implemented in several countries, including Italy, New Zealand, and the United States. In Italy, the system is notable for providing a continuous flow of live information, while in New Zealand, these forecasts have supported critical societal decisions regarding building inspections, land zoning, and the mandatory retrofitting of hazardous structures. Over the decades, the field has progressed from relying solely on long-term, time-independent hazard models to utilizing sophisticated hybrid frameworks that integrate short-term aftershock clustering, medium-term precursory models, and long-term background rates. This evolution has been marked by a shift from simple descriptive recipes to advanced stochastic branching models that can simulate the complex spatiotemporal behavior of seismic sequences. Furthermore, modern progress is bolstered by international efforts like the Collaboratory for the Study of Earthquake Predictability (CSEP), which establishes community standards for the rigorous prospective testing and objective evaluation of these forecasting algorithms.

=== Physics-based and hybrid modeling ===
Research in physics-based and hybrid modeling seeks to merge physical mechanisms with statistical variability to explain complex seismicity. Key examples include modeling Coulomb stress changes to see how one earthquake influences the probability of others and utilizing rate-and-state friction laws to understand aftershock rates. These approaches are often combined into hybrid forecasting tools, like those used by agencies in New Zealand, which link short-term statistical branching with long-term geological strain rates.

== Community resources and meetings ==
=== StatSei workshops ===
The community relies on the biennial International Workshops on Statistical Seismology (StatSei), which have convened regularly since 1998 to evaluate research developments and define future directions.

=== Research and educational resources ===
Educational and technical support is provided through several international initiatives:

- CORSSA: A web-based platform providing peer-reviewed tutorials and software for statistical seismology.
- CSEP: An international collaboratory that conducts rigorous evaluation and prospective testing of earthquake forecasting models.
