= B-value =

B-value may refer to:

- Important characteristic of a thermistor (B parameter)
- B-factor in crystallography
- Constant b in Gutenberg–Richter law
- Acquisition parameter in diffusion MRI
