= Helmut Landsberg =

German climatologist (1906–1985)

Helmut Erich Landsberg
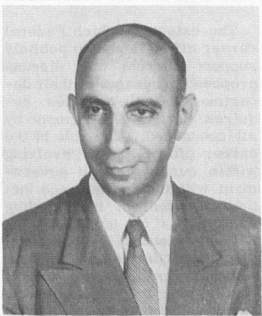
- Born: February 9, 1906; Frankfurt, Germany
- Died: December 6, 1985 (aged 79); Geneva, Switzerland
- Citizenship: United States
- Education: University of Frankfurt
- Known for: Climatology
- Awards: William Bowie Medal (1978); National Medal of Science (1983)
- Scientific career
- Workplaces: University of Frankfurt; Pennsylvania State University University of Chicago NOAA; University of Maryland
- Doctoral advisor: Beno Gutenberg

Helmut Erich Landsberg (1906–1985) was a noted and influential climatologist. He was born in Frankfurt, Germany, February 9, 1906, and died December 6, 1985, in Geneva, Switzerland while attending a meeting of the World Meteorological Organization. Landsberg was an important figure in meteorology and atmospheric science in education, public service and administration. He authored several notable works, particularly in the field of particulate matter and its influence on air pollution and human health. He is the first to write in English about the use of statistical analysis in the field of climatology and implemented such statistical analysis in aiding military operations during World War II. He received a number of significant honors during his life. Several honors are now bestowed in his name in recognition of his contributions to his field.

== Origins and education ==
Landsberg was an only child of a Jewish couple. His father, Georg Landsberg, was a physician and his mother, Clare Zedner Landsberg was a housewife. He attended the city's Woehler Realgymnasium High School, and then went on to study at the University of Frankfurt, physics, mathematics, and geosciences. After further studies at Frankfurt's Institute of Meteorology and Geophysics, he received his PhD in 1930 from the University of Frankfurt, where Beno Gutenberg was his advisor. Gutenberg was a pupil of the founder of modern seismology Emil Johann Wiechert. Beno and Hertha Gutenberg later sponsored Landsberg's emigration to the U.S., during the rise of the Nazi regime.

== Career ==
He served as a supervisor of the Taunus Observatory of Geophysics and Meteorology at that university before moving to the United States in 1934 to teach geophysics and meteorology at the Pennsylvania State University. While there, he offered a graduate seminar on bioclimatic problems, the first such graduate course to be taught in the United States.

He was subsequently appointed to the faculties of the University of Chicago (1941–1943) and the University of Maryland (1967–1976), with which he continued to work until his death. At Maryland, he served as first Director of the Graduate program in Meteorology (later named the Department of Atmospheric and Oceanic Science), and of the Institute for Fluid Dynamics and Applied Mathematics.

Landsberg was skeptical of the risks of man-made global warming, arguing that computer models were unreliable and that the impacts of projected warming would be minor.

In addition to his work in the field of education, Landsberg was active in public service. During World War II, he headed a project for the United States Air Force that provided information on climate and weather statistics in areas undergoing military missions. The U.S. Air Force Chief of Staff officially commended him for this service. Landsberg became the acting director of the Joint Research and Development Board's Committee on Geophysical Sciences (1946) and then the director (1949). In 1949, Landsberg was appointed to the Air Pollution Committee of U.S. President Harry S. Truman, where he helped to shape U.S. air pollution regulations.

Landsberg's other work included administrative service and editing. For 15 volumes from 1964, Landsberg was the editor in chief of the journal World Study of Climatology. He served at the Cambridge Research Center as Director of the Geophysics Directorate (1951–1954) and at the United States Weather Bureau as Director of the Environmental Data Service (1954–1966).

He was a fellow, an honorary member, and Certified Consulting Meteorologist of the American Meteorological Society. He was president of the American Geophysical Union from 1968 to 1970. He was elected to the National Academy of Engineering in 1966. Wilfried Schröder has published memorial note on Helmut Landsberg in " Meteorologische Rundschau," 1985.

== Publications ==
Landsberg's early publications dealt with earthquakes, the impact of weather on aviation, atmospheric suspensions and, most notably, cloud condensation nuclei. Landsberg published a ground-breaking worn on condensation nuclei, the submicrometre-sized particles in the air about which clouds form, which was the first to examine the role such particulate matter plays on air pollution and the degree to which it is retained in the respiratory system. This investigation was the basis of his later work on the impact of urbanization on climate. He also linked falling pressure to the onset of non-induced labor in childbirth. Throughout the 1940s, Landsberg focused on climatology. He introduced English-speaking audiences to the usefulness of statistical analysis in the field in his 1941 book, Physical Climatology.

== Honors ==
Landsberg received a number of honors and recognitions throughout his career. Among his notable honors were the International Meteorological Organization Prize (1979), the William Bowie Medal of the American Geophysical Union (1978), the Outstanding Achievement in Bioclimatology Award (1983) and the Cleveland Abbey Award (1983) of the American Meteorological Society, and the National Medal of Science (1985), presented to him by US President Ronald Reagan.

In recognition of his achievements, his name is associated with several awards bestowed on others. In 1986, the National Oceanic and Atmospheric Administration created the "Helmut E. Landsberg" award in his honor as "one of the preeminent climatologists of our time"; the award is granted to "all observer who have completed 60 years of service as cooperative observers." In 2006, The American Meteorological Society created a "Helmut E. Landsberg Award" to recognize outstanding contributions in urban meteorology, climatology, or hydrology.

== Bibliography ==
- Physical Climatology, first written in 1941. ASIN B000O19HKO
- Urban Climate, last published in 1981. ISBN 0-12-435960-4
- Weather and Health: An Introduction to Biometeorology, last published in 1969.
- Weather, Climate and Human Settlements, last published in 1976.
