= Seismicity =

Measure of earthquake activity at a given geographical location

Seismicity is a measure encompassing earthquake occurrences, mechanisms, and magnitude at a given geographical location. As such, it summarizes a region's seismic activity. The term was coined by Beno Gutenberg and Charles Francis Richter in 1941. Seismicity is studied by geophysicists.

== Calculation of seismicity ==
Seismicity is quantitatively computed. Generally, the region under study is divided in equally sized areas defined by latitude and longitude, and the Earth's interior is divided into various depth intervals on account of Earth's layering: Up to 50 km (31 mi) depth, 50–300 km (31–186 mi), and > 300 km (190 mi).

The usual formula to calculate seismicity is:

$$S = \frac{\sum_{i} {E_{s0}}_i}{ \delta \phi_0 \, \delta \lambda_0 \, \delta h_0 \, \delta t_0 }$$

where

${E_{s0}}_i$: is the energy of a single seismic event (i.e., earthquake);
${\delta \phi}_0$: interval of latitude;
${\delta \lambda}_0$: interval of longitude
${\delta h}_0$: interval of the hypocenter;
${\delta t}_0$: interval of the time of the seismic event.
The result is seismicity as energy per cubic unit.

== See also ==
- Moment magnitude scale
- Plate tectonics
- Seismology
- Wadati–Benioff zone
