= Earthquake forecasting =

Branch of seismology

Earthquake forecasting is a branch of the science of geophysics, primarily seismology, concerned with the probabilistic assessment of earthquake occurrence within a given limits of time, location and magnitude. Often confused with earthquake prediction, earthquake forecasting has a distinct objective. While earthquake prediction aims to specify the exact time, location, and magnitude of a future event to enable immediate emergency action, earthquake forecasting focuses on the probabilistic assessment of future earthquakes over broader windows. Because of this probabilistic framework, it is considered scientifically feasible and forms the foundation of operational earthquake forecasting. Both forecasting and prediction of earthquakes are distinguished from earthquake warning systems, which, upon detection of an earthquake, provide a real-time warning to regions that might be affected.

In the 1970s, scientists were optimistic that a practical method for predicting earthquakes would soon be found, but by the 1990s continuing failure led many to question whether it was even possible. Demonstrably successful predictions of large earthquakes have not occurred, and the few claims of success are controversial. Consequently, many scientific and government resources have been used for probabilistic seismic hazard estimates rather than prediction of individual earthquakes. Such estimates are used to establish building codes, insurance rate structures, awareness and preparedness programs, and public policy related to seismic events. In addition to regional earthquake forecasts, such seismic hazard calculations can take factors such as local geological conditions into account. Anticipated ground motion can then be used to guide building design criteria.

== Methods for earthquake forecasting ==
Methods for earthquake forecasting generally look for trends or patterns that lead to an earthquake. As these trends may be complex and involve many variables, advanced statistical techniques are often needed to understand them, therefore these are sometimes called statistical methods. These approaches tend to have relatively long time periods, making them useful for earthquake forecasting.

=== Elastic rebound ===
Even the stiffest of rock is not perfectly rigid. Given a large force (such as between two immense tectonic plates moving past each other) the Earth's crust will bend or deform. According to the elastic rebound theory of Reid (1910), eventually the deformation (strain) becomes great enough that something breaks, usually at an existing fault. Slippage along the break (an earthquake) allows the rock on each side to rebound to a less deformed state. In the process, energy is released in various forms, including seismic waves. The cycle of tectonic force being accumulated in elastic deformation and released in a sudden rebound is then repeated. As the displacement from a single earthquake ranges from less than a meter to around 10 meters (for an M 8 quake), the demonstrated existence of large strike-slip displacements of hundreds of miles shows the existence of a long-running earthquake cycle.

=== Characteristic earthquakes ===
The most studied earthquake faults (such as the Nankai megathrust, the Wasatch fault, and the San Andreas Fault) appear to have distinct segments. The characteristic earthquake model postulates that earthquakes are generally constrained within these segments. As the lengths and other properties of the segments are fixed, earthquakes that rupture the entire fault should have similar characteristics. These include the maximum magnitude (which is limited by the length of the rupture), and the amount of accumulated strain needed to rupture the fault segment. Since continuous plate motions cause the strain to accumulate steadily, seismic activity on a given segment should be dominated by earthquakes of similar characteristics that recur at somewhat regular intervals. For a given fault segment, identifying these characteristic earthquakes and timing their recurrence rate (or conversely return period) should therefore inform us about the next rupture; this is the approach generally used in forecasting seismic hazard. Return periods are also used for forecasting other rare events, such as cyclones and floods, and assume that future frequency will be similar to observed frequency to date.

Extrapolation from the Parkfield earthquakes of 1857, 1881, 1901, 1922, 1934, and 1966 led to a forecast of an earthquake around 1988, or before 1993 at the latest (at the 95% confidence interval), based on the characteristic earthquake model. Instrumentation was put in place in hopes of detecting precursors of the anticipated earthquake. However, the forecasted earthquake did not occur until 2004. The failure of the Parkfield prediction experiment has raised doubt as to the validity of the characteristic earthquake model itself.

=== Seismic gaps ===
At the contact where two tectonic plates slip past each other, every section must eventually slip, as (in the long-term) none get left behind. But they do not all slip at the same time; different sections will be at different stages in the cycle of strain (deformation) accumulation and sudden rebound. In the seismic gap model, the "next big quake" should be expected not in the segments where recent seismicity has relieved the strain, but in the intervening gaps where the unrelieved strain is the greatest. This model has an intuitive appeal; it is used in long-term forecasting, and was the basis of a series of circum-Pacific (Pacific Rim) forecasts in 1979 and 1989–1991.

However, some underlying assumptions about seismic gaps are now known to be incorrect. A close examination suggests that "there may be no information in seismic gaps about the time of occurrence or the magnitude of the next large event in the region"; statistical tests of the circum-Pacific forecasts shows that the seismic gap model "did not forecast large earthquakes well". Another study concluded that a long quiet period did not increase earthquake potential.

=== Precursor Energy Signals: Electromagnetic Changes and Total Electron Count (TEC) ===
There have been numerous independent reports on the electromagnetic changes possibly associated with earthquakes. But due to the complicated seismogenic process and the limited understanding of the above phenomena, there are active debates on the electromagnetic signals and their relationship with earthquakes. A ten year longitudinal study of magnetic field changes in California from 2010 to 2020 reported a "...statistical signal (is) of modest size" 24 to 72 hours prior to nineteen earthquakes of M 4.5+. An analysis of ten years of Swarm satellite data reported "A significant correlation was found between the magnetic field and TEC anomalies preceding earthquake occurrences". for earthquakes of M4.0+ one to seven days prior to the earthquake event.

== Notable forecasts ==
=== UCERF3 ===
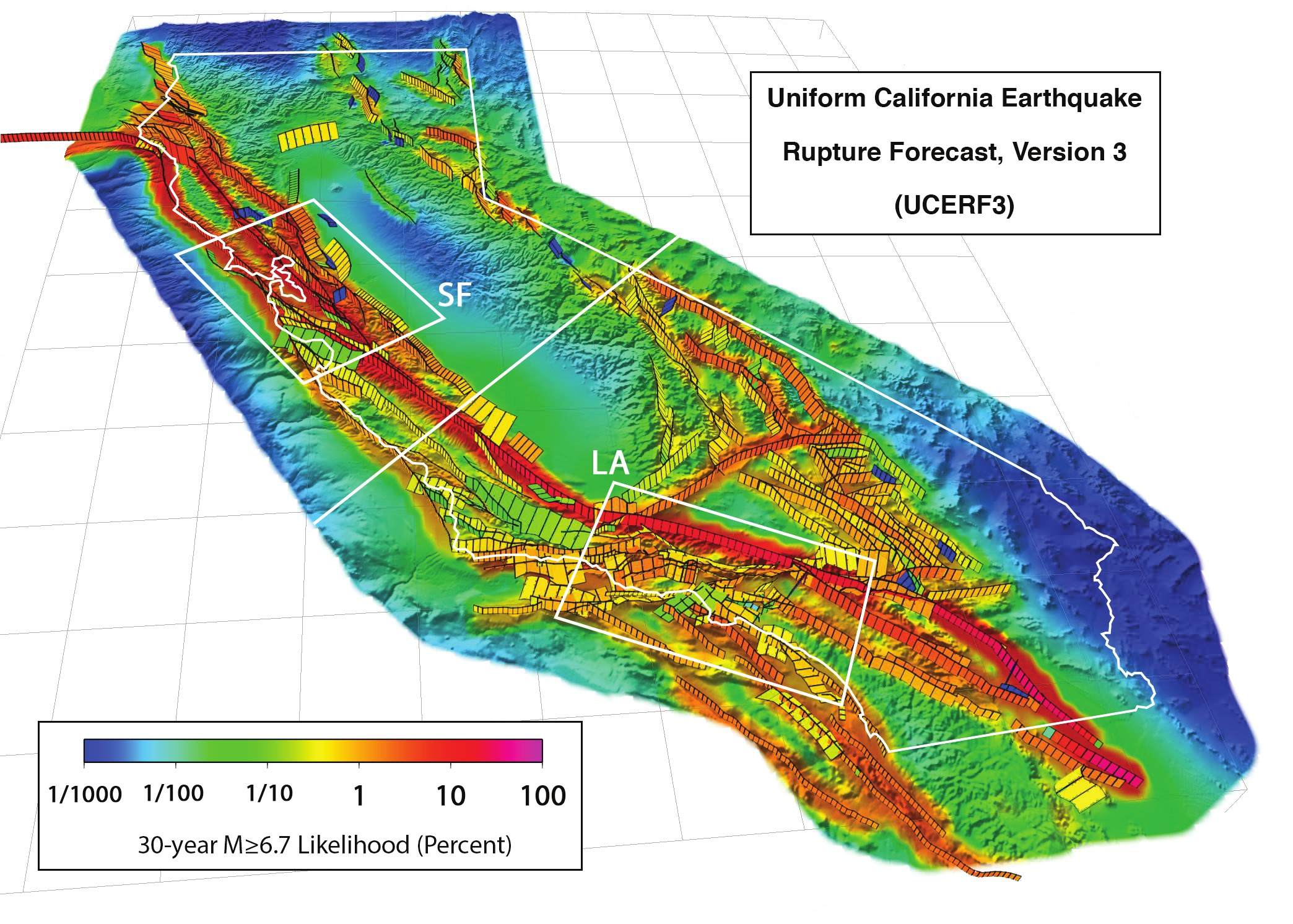
California (outlined in white) and buffer zone showing the 2,606 fault subsections of UCERF 3.1. Colors indicate probability (as a percentage) of experiencing an M ≥ 6.7 earthquake in the next 30 years, accounting for the stress accumulated since the last earthquake. Does not include effects from the Cascadia subduction zone (not shown) in the northwest corner.

The 2015 Uniform California Earthquake Rupture Forecast, Version 3, or UCERF3, is the latest official earthquake rupture forecast (ERF) for the state of California, superseding UCERF2. It provides authoritative estimates of the likelihood and severity of potentially damaging earthquake ruptures in the long- and near-term. Combining this with ground motion models produces estimates of the severity of ground shaking that can be expected during a given period (seismic hazard), and of the threat to the built environment (seismic risk). This information is used to inform engineering design and building codes, planning for disaster, and evaluating whether earthquake insurance premiums are sufficient for the prospective losses. A variety of hazard metrics can be calculated with UCERF3; a typical metric is the likelihood of a magnitude M 6.7 earthquake (the size of the 1994 Northridge earthquake) in the 30 years (typical life of a mortgage) since 2014.

UCERF3 was prepared by the Working Group on California Earthquake Probabilities (WGCEP), a collaboration between the United States Geological Survey (USGS), the California Geological Survey (CGS), and the Southern California Earthquake Center (SCEC), with significant funding from the California Earthquake Authority (CEA).

== Sources ==
- Allen, Clarence R. (December 1976), "Responsibilities in earthquake prediction", Bulletin of the Seismological Society of America, 66 (6): 2069–2074, Bibcode:1976BuSSA..66.2069A, doi:10.1785/BSSA0660062069.
- Bakun, W. H.; Lindh, A. G. (16 August 1985), "The Parkfield, California, Earthquake Prediction Experiment", Science, 229 (4714): 619–624, Bibcode:1985Sci...229..619B, doi:10.1126/science.229.4714.619, PMID 17739363, S2CID 40899434.
- Castellaro, S. (2003), "§2.4.3. The classical earthquake model", in Mulargia, Francesco; Geller, Robert J. (eds.), Earthquake science and seismic risk reduction, Dordrecht: Kluwer Academic Publishers, pp. 56–57, ISBN 978-1-4020-1778-0.
- Console, R. (30 August 2001), "Testing earthquake forecast hypotheses", Tectonophysics, 338 (3–4): 261–268, Bibcode:2001Tectp.338..261C, doi:10.1016/S0040-1951(01)00081-6.
- Evans, R. (December 1997), "Assessment of schemes for earthquake prediction: Editor's introduction", Geophysical Journal International, 131 (3): 413–420, Bibcode:1997GeoJI.131..413E, doi:10.1111/j.1365-246X.1997.tb06585.x.
- Field, Edward H.; Biasi, Glenn P.; Bird, Peter; Dawson, Timothy E.; Felzer, Karen R.; Jackson, David D.; Johnson, Kaj M.; Jordan, Thomas H.; Madden, Christopher; Michael, Andrew J.; Milner, Kevin R.; Page, Morgan T.; Parsons, Tom; Powers, Peter M.; Shaw, Bruce E.; Thatcher, Wayne R.; Weldon, Ray J. II; Zeng, Yuehua (2013), Uniform California earthquake rupture forecast, version 3 (UCERF3) – The time-independent model, vol. Open-File Report 2013–1165, United States Geological Survey. Also California Geological Survey Special Report 228, and Southern California Earthquake Center Publication 1792.
- Geller, Robert J. (December 1997), "Earthquake prediction: a critical review." (PDF), Geophysical Journal International, 131 (3): 425–450, Bibcode:1997GeoJI.131..425G, doi:10.1111/j.1365-246X.1997.tb06588.x
- Geller, Robert J.; Jackson, David D.; Kagan, Yan Y.; Mulargia, Francesco (14 March 1997), "Earthquakes Cannot Be Predicted" (PDF), Science, 275 (5306): 1616, doi:10.1126/science.275.5306.1616, S2CID 123516228, archived from the original (PDF) on 12 May 2019.
- International Commission on Earthquake Forecasting for Civil Protection (30 May 2011), "Operational Earthquake Forecasting: State of Knowledge and Guidelines for Utilization", Annals of Geophysics, 54 (4): 315–391, doi:10.4401/ag-5350, hdl:20.500.11820/6552f865-6e59-47f1-a5ec-b7446bfd1a82, S2CID 129825964.
- Jackson, David D. (2004), "Earthquake Prediction and Forecasting" (PDF), in Sparks, R. S. J.; Hawkesworth, C. J. (eds.), The State of the Planet: Frontiers and Challenges in Geophysics, Geophysical Monograph Series, vol. 150, pp. 335–348, Bibcode:2004GMS...150..335J, doi:10.1029/150GM26, ISBN 0-87590-415-7.
- Jackson, David D.; Kagan, Yan Y. (September 2006), "The 2004 Parkfield earthquake, the 1985 prediction, and characteristic earthquakes: Lessons for the future" (PDF), Bulletin of the Seismological Society of America, 96 (4B): S397–S409, Bibcode:2006BuSSA..96S.397J, doi:10.1785/0120050821, archived from the original (PDF) on 2014-03-23.
- Kagan, Yan Y. (December 1997b), "Are earthquakes predictable?", Geophysical Journal International, 131 (3): 505–525, Bibcode:1997GeoJI.131..505K, doi:10.1111/j.1365-246X.1997.tb06595.x.
- Kagan, Yan Y.; Jackson, David D. (10 December 1991), "Seismic Gap Hypothesis: Ten Years After" (PDF), Journal of Geophysical Research: Solid Earth, 96 (B13): 21419–21431, Bibcode:1991JGR....9621419K, doi:10.1029/91jb02210, archived from the original (PDF) on 4 March 2016.
- Kagan, Yan Y.; Jackson, David D. (27 May 1996). "Statistical tests of VAN earthquake predictions: comments and reflections" (PDF). Geophysical Research Letters (FTP). pp. 1433–1436. Bibcode:1996GeoRL..23.1433K. doi:10.1029/95GL03786. (To view documents see Help:FTP).
- Kagan, Yan Y.; Knopoff, Leon (19 June 1987), "Statistical Short-Term Earthquake Prediction", Science, 236 (4808): 1563–1567, Bibcode:1987Sci...236.1563K, doi:10.1126/science.236.4808.1563, PMID 17835741, S2CID 12946111.
- Kanamori, Hiroo (2003), "Earthquake Prediction: An Overview", International Handbook of Earthquake and Engineering Seismology, International Geophysics, vol. 616, pp. 1205–1216, doi:10.1016/s0074-6142(03)80186-9, ISBN 0-12-440658-0.
- Lomnitz, Cinna; Nava, F. Alejandro (December 1983), "The predictive value of seismic gaps.", Bulletin of the Seismological Society of America, 73 (6A): 1815–1824.
- McCann, W. R.; Nishenko, S. P.; Sykes, L. R.; Krause, J. (1979), "Seismic gaps and plate tectonics: Seismic potential for major boundaries", Pure and Applied Geophysics, 117 (6): 1082–1147, Bibcode:1979PApGe.117.1082M, doi:10.1007/BF00876211, S2CID 129377355.
- Reid, Harry Fielding (1910), "The Mechanics of the Earthquake.", The California Earthquake of April 18, 1906: Report of the State Earthquake Investigation Commission, vol. 2.
- Rong, Yufang; Jackson, David D.; Kagan, Yan Y. (October 2003), "Seismic gaps and earthquakes" (PDF), Journal of Geophysical Research: Solid Earth, 108 (B10): 2471, Bibcode:2003JGRB..108.2471R, doi:10.1029/2002JB002334, S2CID 14079028.
- Scholz, Christopher H. (2002), The Mechanics of earthquakes and faulting (2nd ed.), Cambridge Univ. Press, ISBN 0-521-65223-5.
- Schwartz, David P.; Coppersmith, Kevin J. (10 July 1984), "Fault Behavior and Characteristic Earthquakes: Examples From the Wasatch and San Andreas Fault Zones", Journal of Geophysical Research: Solid Earth, 89 (B7): 5681–5698, Bibcode:1984JGR....89.5681S, doi:10.1029/JB089iB07p05681.
- Tiampo, Kristy F.; Shcherbakov, Robert (2012), "Seismicity-based earthquake forecasting techniques: Ten years of progress" (PDF), Tectonophysics, 522–523: 89–121, Bibcode:2012Tectp.522...89T, doi:10.1016/j.tecto.2011.08.019, archived from the original (PDF) on 2016-05-16.
- Wells, D. L.; Coppersmith, K. J. (August 1994), "New empirical relationships among magnitude, rupture length, rupture width, rupture area, and surface displacement." (PDF), Bulletin of the Seismological Society of America, 84 (4): 974–1002, Bibcode:1994BuSSA..84..974W, doi:10.1785/BSSA0840040974, archived from the original (PDF) on 2019-01-03.
- Wood, H. O.; Gutenberg, B. (6 September 1935), "Earthquake prediction", Science, 82 (2123): 219–320, Bibcode:1935Sci....82..219W, doi:10.1126/science.82.2123.219, PMID 17818812.
- Zoback, Mary Lou (April–May 2006), "The 1906 earthquake and a century of progress in understanding earthquakes and their hazards" (PDF), GSA Today, 16 (r/5): 4–11, Bibcode:2006GSAT...16d...4Z, doi:10.1130/GSAT01604.1.
- Wang, Kelin; Chen, Qi-Fu; Sun, Shihong; Wang, Andong (June 2006), "Predicting the 1975 Haicheng Earthquake" (PDF), Bulletin of the Seismological Society of America, 96 (3): 757–795, Bibcode:2006BuSSA..96..757W, doi:10.1785/0120050191.
