= Charles Richter =

Seismologist and physicist (1900–1985)

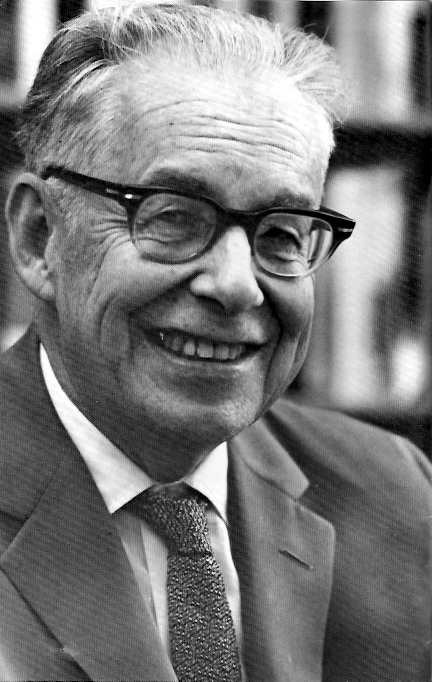
- Charles Richter, c. 1970
- Born: Charles Francis Richter; April 26, 1900; Overpeck, Ohio, U.S.
- Died: September 30, 1985 (aged 85); Pasadena, California, U.S.
- Education: Stanford University; California Institute of Technology
- Known for: Richter scale Gutenberg–Richter law Surface-wave magnitude
- Awards: The Seismological Laboratory in Pasadena.
- Scientific career
- Fields: Seismology, physics
- Workplaces: California Institute of Technology

Charles Francis Richter (/ˈrɪktər/; April 26, 1900 – September 30, 1985) was an American seismologist and physicist. He is one of the creators of the Richter scale, which, until the development of the moment magnitude scale in 1979, was widely used to quantify the size of earthquakes. Inspired by Kiyoo Wadati's 1928 paper on shallow and deep earthquakes, Richter first used the scale in 1935 after developing it in collaboration with Beno Gutenberg; both worked at the California Institute of Technology.

== Childhood and education ==
Richter was born in Overpeck, Ohio, on April 26, 1900. Richter had German heritage: his great-grandfather was a Forty-Eighter, coming from Baden-Baden (today in Baden-Württemberg, Germany) in 1848 in the wake of the German revolutions of 1848–1849. Richter's parents Frederick William and Lillian Anna (Kinsinger) Richter, were divorced when he was very young.

Richter was enrolled in the Hobart Boulevard Elementary School. In his early life, he had faced being isolated and without getting time to play with other children. He faced problems of getting along with other children, and had difficulties in properly adjusting to his school. At 13 years old, Richter's mother admitted him to a special preparatory school that was attached to the University of Southern California. With his new school admission, Richter's grades and interest improved, and he kept examples of his school papers such as assignments, tests and exercises. He began his college work at the University of Southern California when he was 16 years old. Just one year later, he transferred to Stanford University, where he studied the field of chemistry.

He grew up with his maternal grandfather, who moved the family (including his mother) to Los Angeles in 1909. After graduating from Los Angeles High School he attended Stanford University and received his undergraduate degree in 1920. In 1928, he began work on his PhD in theoretical physics from California Institute of Technology, but before he finished it, he was offered a position at the Carnegie Institute of Washington.

At this point, he became fascinated with seismology (the study of earthquakes and the waves they produce in the earth). Thereafter, he worked at the new Seismological Laboratory in Pasadena, under the direction of Beno Gutenberg. In 1932, Richter and Gutenberg developed a standard scale to measure the relative sizes of earthquake sources, called the Richter scale. In 1937, he returned to the California Institute of Technology, where he spent the rest of his career, eventually becoming professor of seismology in 1952. "I wasn't supposed to do routine work on earthquakes,'' he recalled in an interview years later. ''But someone had to find out where they originated and how big they were, so I did it."

== Career ==
In 1923, Robert Millikan gave a series of lectures regarding physics. Richter commented on his eagerness to hear Millikan's lectures and said the result of it was that he gave up his employment and joined California Institute of Technology as a graduate student. According to Susan Zannos, Richter established himself as an excellent student with this decision, and applied his knowledge to new fields. He based his thesis on the subject of Hydrogen bomb, gaining idea from the new ideas of quantum mechanics. Charles Richter then took to the research of physics and became a physics professor. In 1927, the Seismological Laboratory was established in the California Institute by the Carnegie Foundation. Susan Zannos said that the reason the Laboratory was built in California was because as a place where many earthquakes occurred, the location was ideal. Harry O. Wood, an American seismologist, became the director of the lab. Wood asked Millikan to suggest him a young scientist who could serve as a research assistant. Millikan recommended Richter to him. By the time of his recommendation, Richter had not begun to study about earthquakes or the field of seismology, but had experience in quantum mechanics. Richter later told that it was "a happy incident" during an interview with U. S. Geological Survey. With Wood's team, he engaged the routine work of measuring seismograms and locating earthquakes.

Richter went to work at the Carnegie Institution of Washington in 1927 after Robert Andrews Millikan offered him a position as a research assistant there, where he began a collaboration with Beno Gutenberg. The Seismology Lab at the California Institute of Technology wanted to begin publishing regular reports on earthquakes in southern California and had a pressing need for a system of measuring the strength of earthquakes for these reports. Together, Richter and Gutenberg devised the scale that would become known as the Richter scale to fill this need, based on measuring quantitatively the displacement of the earth by seismic waves, as Kiyoo Wadati had suggested.

The pair designed a seismograph that measured this displacement and developed a logarithmic scale to measure intensity. The name "magnitude" for this measurement came from Richter's childhood interest in astronomy – astronomers measure the intensity of stars in magnitudes. Gutenberg's contribution was substantial, but his aversion to interviews contributed to his name being left off the scale. After the publication of the proposed scale in 1935, seismologists quickly adopted it for use in measuring the intensity of earthquakes.

Richter remained at the Carnegie Institution until 1936, when he obtained a post at the California Institute of Technology, where Beno Gutenberg worked. Gutenberg and Richter published Seismicity of the Earth in 1941. Its revised edition, published in 1954, is considered a standard reference in the field.

Richter became a full professor at the California Institute of Technology in 1952. In 1958, he published Elementary Seismology based on his undergraduate teaching notes. As Richter seldom published in peer reviewed scientific journals, that is often considered his most important contribution to seismology. Richter spent 1959 and 1960 in Japan as a Fulbright scholar. Around this time in his career, he became involved in earthquake engineering through development of building codes for earthquake prone areas. The city government of Los Angeles removed many ornaments and cornices from municipal buildings in the 1960s as a result of Richter's awareness campaigns.

When the 1971 San Fernando earthquake started, "he jumped up screaming and scared the cat" said Richter's wife. He had retired in 1970 but had not stopped working. San Fernando praised Richter's warnings for preventing many deaths.

=== Predicting earthquakes ===
Richter was skeptical of scientists who pursued earthquake prediction. At parties Richter was considered "the earthquake man" and rejected regular requests to predict the next earthquake by always responding, "five o'clock tomorrow morning''.

== Richter magnitude scale ==
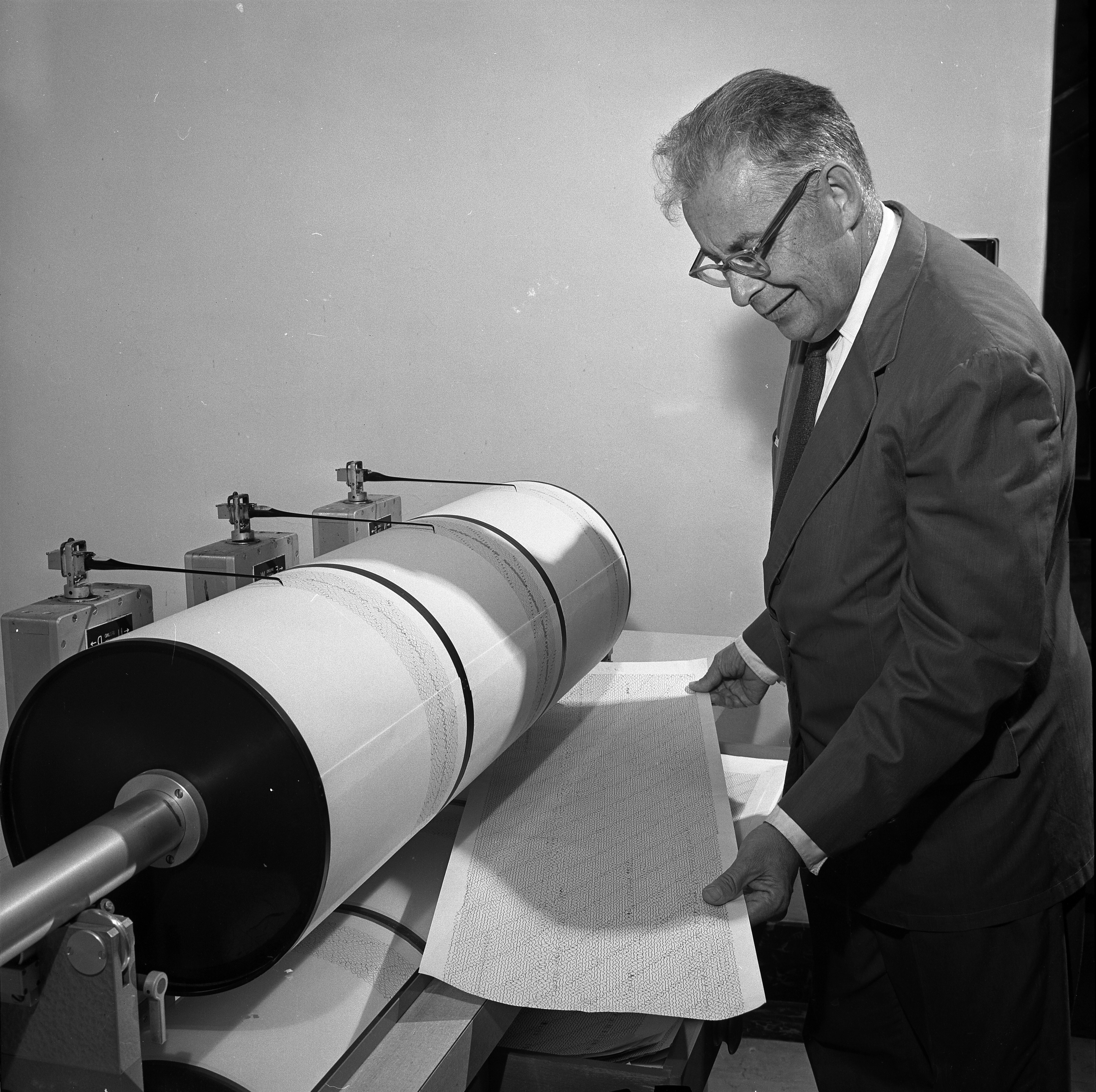
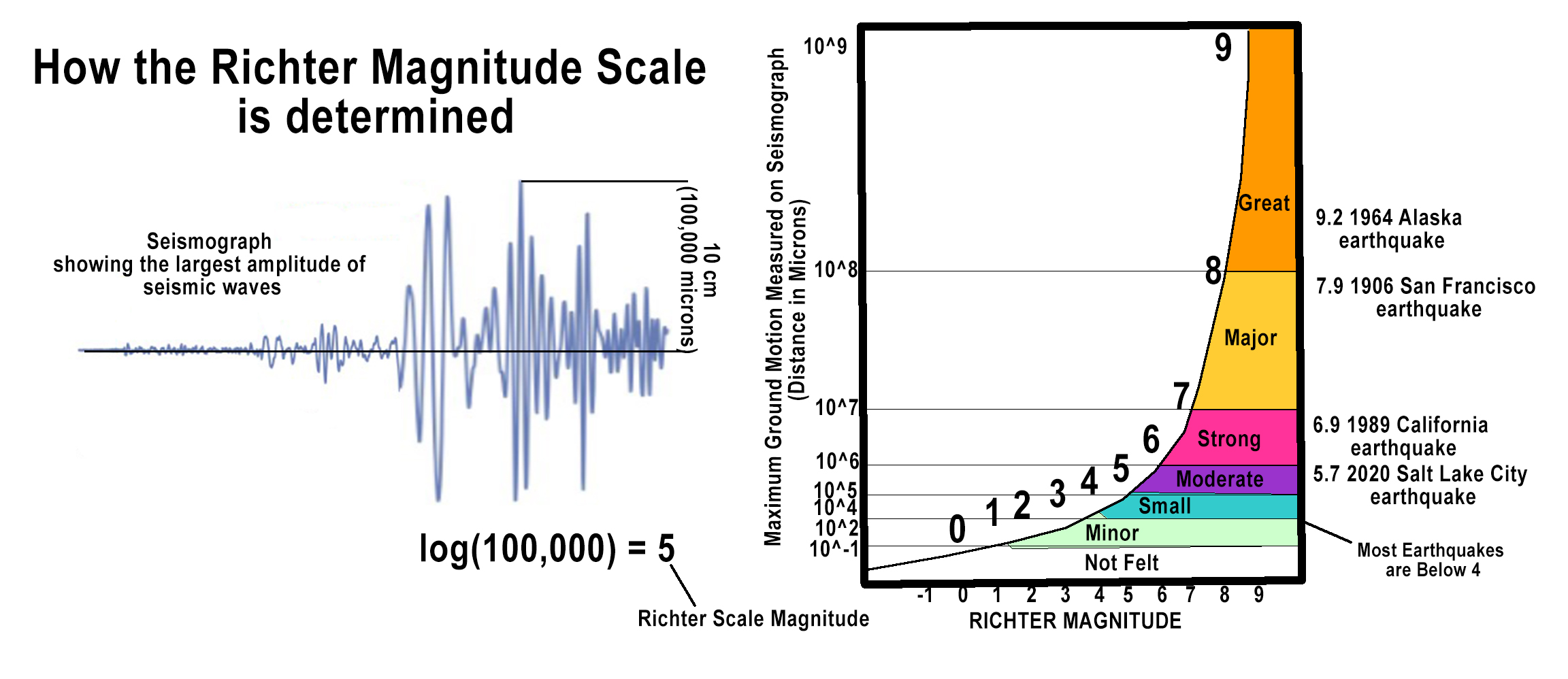
(Above) Richter analyzes a seismograph log, the basis for (below) the Richter scale.

At the time when Richter began a collaboration with Gutenberg, the only way to rate shocks was a scale developed in 1902 by the Italian priest and geologist Giuseppe Mercalli. The Mercalli scale uses Roman numerals and classifies earthquakes from I to XII, depending on how buildings and people responded to the tremor. A shock that set chandeliers swinging might rate as a I or II on this scale, while one that destroyed huge buildings and created panic in a crowded city might count as an X. The obvious problem with the Mercalli scale was that it relied on subjective measures of how well a building had been constructed and how used to these sorts of crises the population was. The Mercalli scale also made it difficult to rate earthquakes that happened in remote, sparsely populated areas.

The scale developed by Richter and Gutenberg (which became known by Richter's name only) was instead an absolute measure of an earthquake's intensity. Richter used a seismograph, an instrument generally consisting of a constantly unwinding roll of paper, anchored to a fixed place, and a pendulum or magnet suspended with a marking device above the roll, to record actual earth motion during an earthquake. The scale takes into account the instrument's distance from the epicenter, or the point on the ground that is directly above the earthquake's origin.

Richter chose to use the term "magnitude" to describe an earthquake's strength because of his early interest in astronomy; stargazers use the word to describe the brightness of stars. Gutenberg suggested that the scale be logarithmic so an earthquake of magnitude 7 would be ten times stronger than a 6, a hundred times stronger than a 5, and a thousand times stronger than a 4. (The 1989 Loma Prieta earthquake that shook San Francisco was magnitude 6.9.) The quote "logarithmic plots are a device of the devil" is attributed to Richter.

The Richter scale was published in 1935 and immediately became the standard measure of earthquake intensity. Richter did not seem concerned that Gutenberg's name was not included at first; but in later years, after Gutenberg was already dead, Richter began to insist for his colleague to be recognized for expanding the scale to apply to earthquakes all over the globe, not just in southern California. Since 1935, several other magnitude scales have been developed.

== Personal life ==
Richter was an active and avowed naturist. He travelled to many naturist resorts with his wife, who died in 1972.

At his retirement party, a group of Caltech colleagues performed an original earthquake-themed ballad called "The Richter Scale" which began: "Charlie Richter made a scale, for calibrating earthquakes. Gives the true and lucid reading, every time the earth shakes." Richter was remembered as receiving the song poorly and calling it an insult to science. Richter eventually came around to the song, reported its lyricist J. Kent Clark in a 1989 interview. Even after his official retirement from Caltech, Richter continued to study seismographic data in his laboratory daily.

Richter died of congestive heart failure on September 30, 1985, in Pasadena, California. He is buried in Altadena, California's Mountain View Cemetery and Mausoleum.

== Works ==
- Richter, CF (1976). "Earthquake Light in Focus". Science. 194 (4262): 259. Bibcode:1976Sci...194..259R. doi:10.1126/science.194.4262.259. PMID 17738034.
- —; Archambeau, C. B.; Brune, J. N.; Anderson, D. L.; Smith, S. W.; Al, J. H.; Bai, L. F.; Ryall, A.; Boucher, G.; Emilian, C.; Harrisoi, C. G. A.; Swansoi, M. (1970). "Earthquakes and Nuclear Detonations". Science. 167 (3920): 1011–1014. Bibcode:1970Sci...167.1011A. doi:10.1126/science.167.3920.1011. ISSN 0036-8075. PMID 17749620.
- — (1969). "Transversely Aligned Seismicity and Concealed Structure". Science. 166 (3902): 173–178. Bibcode:1969Sci...166..173R. doi:10.1126/science.166.3902.173. PMID 17731474.
- — (1958). "New Dimensions in Seismology: Earthquakes are characterized by geographical position, instant of occurrence, depth, and magnitude". Science. 128 (3317): 175–182. Bibcode:1958Sci...128..175R. doi:10.1126/science.128.3317.175. PMID 17814547.
- — (1956). "Dangerous Dagger". Science. 123 (3200): 723. Bibcode:1956Sci...123..723R. doi:10.1126/science.123.3200.723. PMID 17740174.
- — (1943). "Mathematical Questions in Seismology" (PDF). Bull. Amer. Math. Soc. 49 (7): 477–493. doi:10.1090/s0002-9904-1943-07923-2.
- —; Gutenberg, B (1936). "Magnitude and Energy of Earthquakes" (PDF). Science. 83 (2147): 183–185. Bibcode:1936Sci....83..183G. doi:10.1126/science.83.2147.183. PMID 17770563.
- — (1935). "An instrumental earthquake magnitude scale" (PDF). Bulletin of the Seismological Society of America. 25 (1–2): 1–32. Bibcode:1935BuSSA..25....1R. doi:10.1785/BSSA0250010001. Archived from the original (PDF) on July 30, 2013.

== See also ==
- Modified Mercalli intensity scale
- Seismicity
- Macroseismic magnitude

== In popular culture ==
- Richter, a character from the Frieren: Beyond Journey's End manga and anime series, is a Second-Class Mage who specializes in Earth Control Magic (Bargland), which allows him to manipulate, shape, and weaponize rock and soil.

== Sources ==
- Hough, Susan Elizabeth (2007). Richter's scale : measure of an earthquake, measure of a man. Princeton: Princeton University Press. p. 1. ISBN 9780691128078.
- Zannos, Susan (2004). Charles Richter and the Story of the Richter Scale (1st ed.). Mitchell Lane Publishers. ISBN 1-58415-175-7.
