= Earthquake =

Sudden movement of the Earth's crust

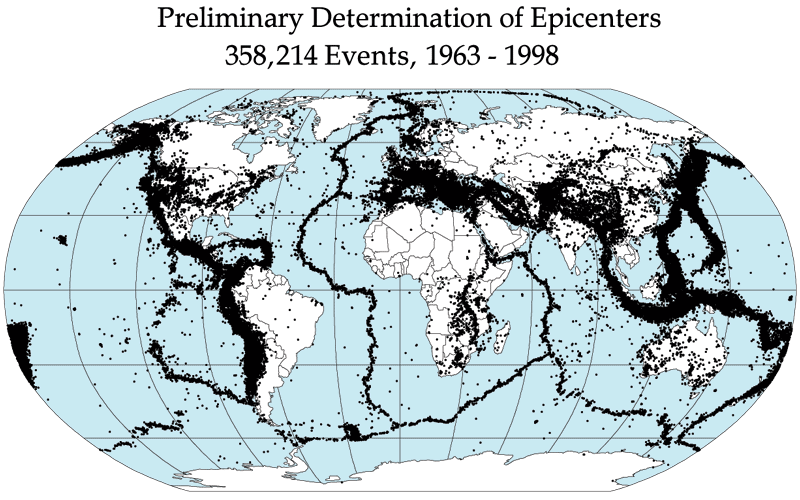
Earthquake epicenters occur mostly along tectonic plate boundaries, especially on the Pacific Ring of Fire.

An earthquake, also called a quake, tremor, or temblor, is the shaking of the Earth's surface resulting from a sudden release of energy in the lithosphere that creates seismic waves. Earthquakes can range in intensity, from those so weak they cannot be felt, to those violent enough to propel objects and people into the air, damage critical infrastructure, and wreak destruction across entire cities. The seismic activity of an area is the frequency, type, and size of earthquakes experienced over a particular time. The seismicity at a particular location in the Earth is the average rate of seismic energy released per unit volume.

In its most general sense, the word earthquake is used to describe any seismic event that generates seismic waves. Earthquakes can occur naturally or be induced by human activities, such as mining, fracking, and nuclear weapons testing. The initial point of rupture is called the hypocenter or focus, while the ground level directly above it is the epicenter. Earthquakes are primarily caused by geological faults, but also by volcanism, landslides, and other seismic events.

Significant historical earthquakes include the 1976 Tangshan earthquake in China, with over 300,000 fatalities, and the 1960 Valdivia earthquake in Chile, the largest ever recorded at 9.5 magnitude. Earthquakes in some cases may result in various effects, such as ground shaking and soil liquefaction, sometimes leading to significant damage and loss of life. When the epicenter of a large earthquake is located offshore, the seabed may be displaced sufficiently to cause a tsunami. Earthquakes can trigger landslides. The occurrence of earthquakes is influenced by tectonic movements along faults, including normal, reverse (thrust), and strike-slip faults, with energy release and rupture dynamics governed by the elastic-rebound theory.

Efforts to manage earthquake risks involve prediction, forecasting, and preparedness, including seismic retrofitting and earthquake engineering to design structures that withstand shaking. The cultural impact of earthquakes spans myths, religious beliefs, and modern media, reflecting their profound influence on human societies. Similar phenomena, known as marsquakes and moonquakes have been observed.

== Terminology ==
An earthquake is the shaking of the surface of Earth resulting from a sudden release of energy in the lithosphere that creates seismic waves. Earthquakes may also be referred to as quakes, tremors, or temblors. The word tremor is also used for non-earthquake seismic rumbling.

In its most general sense, an earthquake is any seismic event—whether natural or caused by humans—that generates seismic waves. Earthquakes are caused mostly by the rupture of geological faults but also by other events such as volcanic activity, landslides, mine blasts, fracking and nuclear tests. An earthquake's point of initial rupture is called its hypocenter or focus. The epicenter is the point at ground level directly above the hypocenter.

The seismic activity of an area is the frequency, type, and size of earthquakes experienced over a particular time. The seismicity at a particular location in the Earth is the average rate of seismic energy release per unit volume.

== Major examples ==
Earthquakes (M6.0+) since 1900 through 2017

Earthquakes of magnitude 8.0 and greater from 1900 to 2018. The apparent 3D volumes of the bubbles are linearly proportional to their respective fatalities.

One of the most devastating earthquakes in recorded history was the 1556 Shaanxi earthquake, which occurred on 23 January 1556 in Shaanxi, China. More than 100,000 people died, with the region losing up to 730,000 people afterwards due to emigration, plague, and famine. Most houses in the area were yaodongs—dwellings carved out of loess hillsides—and many victims were killed when these structures collapsed. The 1976 Tangshan earthquake, which killed between 240,000 and 655,000 people, was the deadliest of the 20th century.

The 1960 Chilean earthquake is the largest earthquake that has been measured on a seismograph, reaching 9.5 magnitude on 22 May 1960. Its epicenter was near Cañete, Chile. The energy released was approximately twice that of the next most powerful earthquake, the Good Friday earthquake (27 March 1964), which was centered in Prince William Sound, Alaska. The ten largest recorded earthquakes have all been megathrust earthquakes; however, of these ten, only the 2004 Indian Ocean earthquake is simultaneously one of the deadliest earthquakes in history.

Earthquakes that caused the greatest loss of life, while powerful, were deadly because of their proximity to either heavily populated areas or the ocean, where earthquakes often create tsunamis that can devastate communities thousands of kilometers away. Regions most at risk for great loss of life include those where earthquakes are relatively rare but powerful, and poor regions with lax, unenforced, or nonexistent seismic building codes.

Significant earthquakes

== Occurrence ==
Three types of faults: A. Strike-slip B. Normal C. Reverse

Tectonic earthquakes occur anywhere on the earth where there is sufficient stored elastic strain energy to drive fracture propagation along a fault plane. The sides of a fault move past each other smoothly and aseismically only if there are no irregularities or asperities along the fault surface that increases the frictional resistance. Most fault surfaces do have such asperities, which leads to a form of stick-slip behavior. Once the fault has locked, continued relative motion between the plates leads to increasing stress and, therefore, stored strain energy in the volume around the fault surface. This continues until the stress has risen sufficiently to break through the asperity, suddenly allowing sliding over the locked portion of the fault, releasing the stored energy. This energy is released as a combination of radiated elastic strain seismic waves, frictional heating of the fault surface, and cracking of the rock, thus causing an earthquake.

This process of gradual build-up of strain and stress punctuated by occasional sudden earthquake failure is referred to as the elastic-rebound theory. It is estimated that only 10 percent or less of an earthquake's total energy is radiated as seismic energy. Most of the earthquake's energy is used to power the earthquake fracture growth or is converted into heat generated by friction. Therefore, earthquakes lower the Earth's available elastic potential energy and raise its temperature, though these changes are negligible compared to the conductive and convective flow of heat out from the Earth's deep interior.

=== Fault types ===
There are three main types of fault, all of which may cause an interplate earthquake: normal, reverse (thrust), and strike-slip. Normal and reverse faulting are examples of dip-slip, where the displacement along the fault is in the direction of dip and where movement on them involves a vertical component. Many earthquakes are caused by movement on faults that have components of both dip-slip and strike-slip; this is known as oblique slip.

The topmost, brittle part of the Earth's crust, and the cool slabs of the tectonic plates that are descending into the hot mantle, are the only parts of our planet that can store elastic energy and release it in fault ruptures. Rocks hotter than about 300 °C (572 °F) flow in response to stress; they do not rupture in earthquakes. The maximum observed lengths of ruptures and mapped faults (which may break in a single rupture) are approximately 1,000 km (620 mi). Examples are the earthquakes in Alaska (1957), Chile (1960), and Sumatra (2004), all in subduction zones. The longest earthquake ruptures on strike-slip faults, like the San Andreas Fault (1857, 1906), the North Anatolian Fault in Turkey (1939), and the Denali Fault in Alaska (2002), are about half to one third as long as the lengths along subducting plate margins, and those along normal faults are even shorter.

==== Normal faults ====
Normal faults occur mainly in areas where the crust is being extended such as a divergent boundary. Earthquakes associated with normal faults are generally less than magnitude 7. Maximum magnitudes along many normal faults are even more limited because many of them are located along spreading centers, as in Iceland, where the thickness of the brittle layer is only about six kilometres (3.7 mi).

==== Reverse faults ====
Reverse faults occur in areas where the crust is being shortened such as at a convergent boundary. Reverse faults, particularly those along convergent boundaries, are associated with the most powerful earthquakes (called megathrust earthquakes) including almost all of those of magnitude 8 or more. Megathrust earthquakes are responsible for about 90% of the total seismic moment released worldwide.

==== Strike-slip faults ====
Strike-slip faults are steep structures where the two sides of the fault slip horizontally past each other; transform boundaries are a particular type of strike-slip fault. Strike-slip faults, particularly continental transforms, can produce major earthquakes up to about magnitude 8. Strike-slip faults tend to be oriented near vertically, resulting in an approximate width of 10 km (6.2 mi) within the brittle crust. Thus, earthquakes with magnitudes much larger than 8 are not possible.

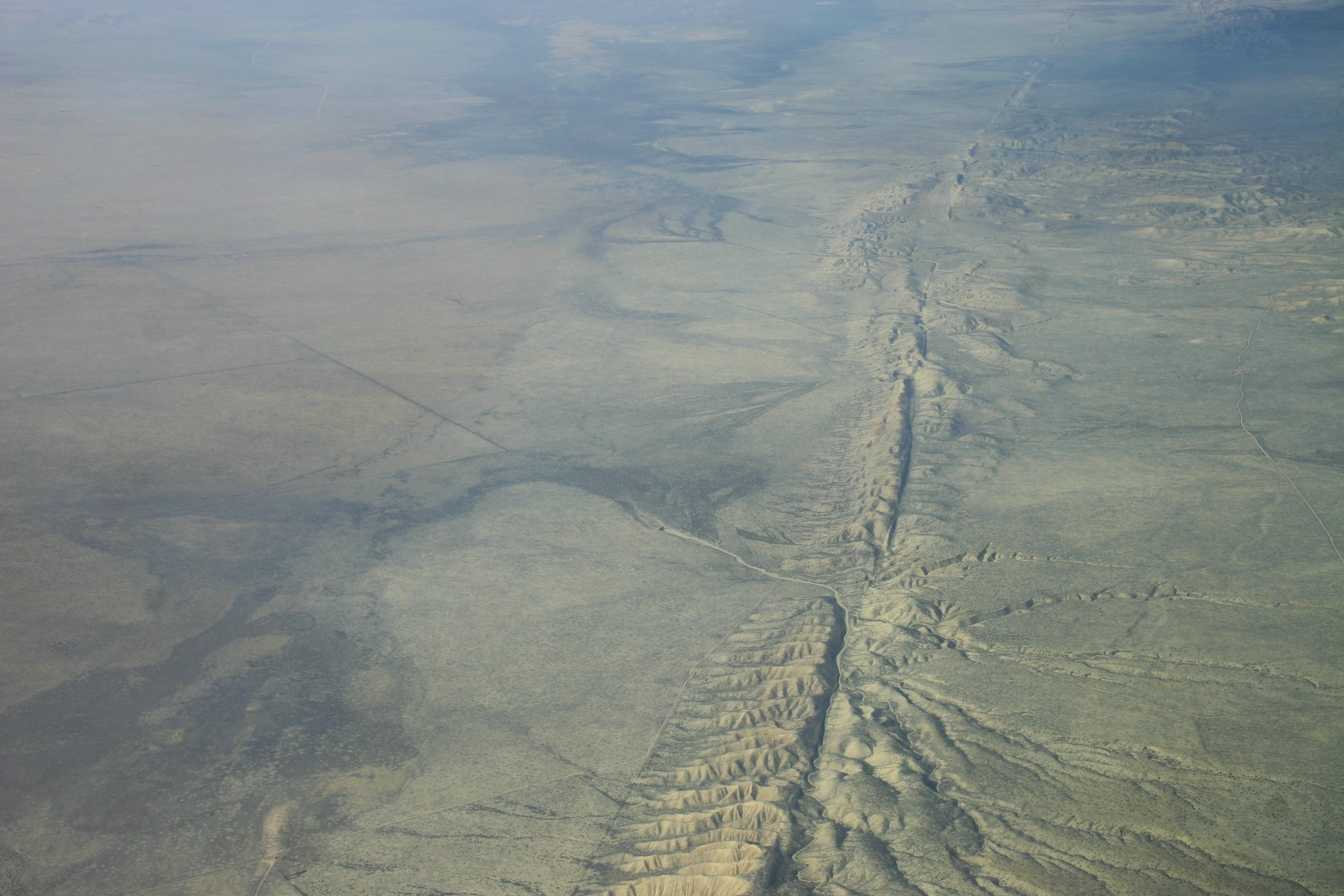
Aerial photo of the San Andreas Fault in the Carrizo Plain, northwest of Los Angeles

In addition, there exists a hierarchy of stress levels in the three fault types. Thrust faults are generated by the highest, strike-slip by intermediate, and normal faults by the lowest stress levels. This can easily be understood by considering the direction of the greatest principal stress, the direction of the force that "pushes" the rock mass during the faulting. In the case of normal faults, the rock mass is pushed down in a vertical direction, thus the pushing force (greatest principal stress) equals the weight of the rock mass itself. In the case of thrusting, the rock mass "escapes" in the direction of the least principal stress, namely upward, lifting the rock mass, and thus, the overburden equals the least principal stress. Strike-slip faulting is intermediate between the other two types described above. This difference in stress regime in the three faulting environments can contribute to differences in stress drop during faulting, which contributes to differences in the radiated energy, regardless of fault dimensions.

=== Energy released ===
For every unit increase in seismic magnitude, there is a roughly thirty-fold increase in the energy released. For instance, an earthquake of magnitude 6.0 releases approximately 32 times as much energy as an earthquake of magnitude 5.0, and a 7.0 magnitude earthquake releases about 1,000 times as much energy as a 5.0 magnitude earthquake. An 8.0-magnitude earthquake releases the same amount of energy as 5,600 atomic bombs of the size used in World War II.

This is so because the energy released in an earthquake, and thus its magnitude, is proportional to the area of the fault that ruptures and the stress drop. Therefore, the greater the length and width of the faulted area, the greater the resulting magnitude. The most important parameter controlling the maximum earthquake magnitude on a fault, however, is not the maximum available length, but the available width because the latter varies by a factor of 20. Along converging plate margins, the dip angle of the rupture plane is very shallow, typically about 10 degrees. Thus, the width of the plane within the top brittle crust of the Earth can reach 50–100 km (31–62 mi) (such as in Japan, 2011, or in Alaska, 1964), making the most powerful earthquakes possible.

=== Focus ===
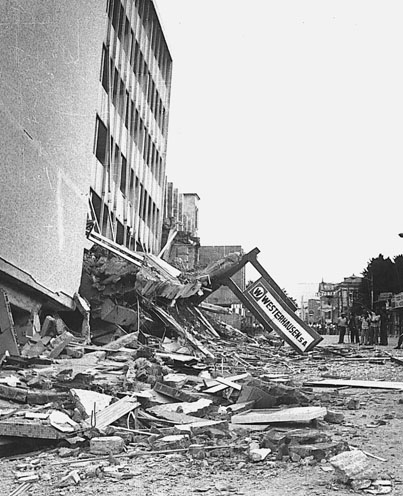
Collapsed Gran Hotel building in the San Salvador metropolis, after the shallow 1986 San Salvador earthquake

The majority of tectonic earthquakes originate in the Ring of Fire at depths not exceeding tens of kilometers. Earthquakes occurring at depths less than 70 km (43 mi) are classified as "shallow-focus" earthquakes, while those with focal depths between 70 and 300 km (43 and 186 mi) are commonly termed intermediate-depth or "intermediate-focus" earthquakes.

In subduction zones, where older and colder oceanic crust descends beneath another tectonic plate, deep-focus earthquakes may occur at much greater depths (ranging from 300 to 700 km (190 to 430 mi)). These seismically active areas of subduction are known as Wadati–Benioff zones. Deep-focus earthquakes occur at depths where the subducted lithosphere should no longer be brittle, due to the high temperature and pressure. A possible mechanism for the generation of deep-focus earthquakes is faulting caused by olivine undergoing a phase transition into a spinel structure.

=== Volcanic activity ===
Earthquakes often occur in volcanic regions and are caused there, both by tectonic faults and the movement of magma in volcanoes. Such earthquakes can serve as an early warning of volcanic eruptions, as during the 1980 eruption of Mount St. Helens. Earthquake swarms can serve as markers for the location of the flowing magma throughout the volcanoes. These swarms can be recorded by seismometers and tiltmeters (a device that measures ground slope) and used as sensors to predict imminent or upcoming eruptions.

=== Rupture dynamics ===
A tectonic earthquake begins as an area of initial slip on the fault surface that forms the focus. Once the rupture has been initiated, it begins to propagate away from the focus, spreading out along the fault surface. Lateral propagation will continue until either the rupture reaches a barrier, such as the end of a fault segment, or a region on the fault where there is insufficient stress to allow continued rupture. For larger earthquakes, the depth extent of rupture will be constrained downwards by the brittle-ductile transition zone and upwards by the ground surface. The mechanics of this process are poorly understood because it is difficult either to recreate such rapid movements in a laboratory or to record seismic waves close to a nucleation zone due to strong ground motion.

In most cases, the rupture speed approaches, but does not exceed, the shear wave (S wave) velocity of the surrounding rock. There are a few exceptions to this:

==== Supershear earthquakes ====
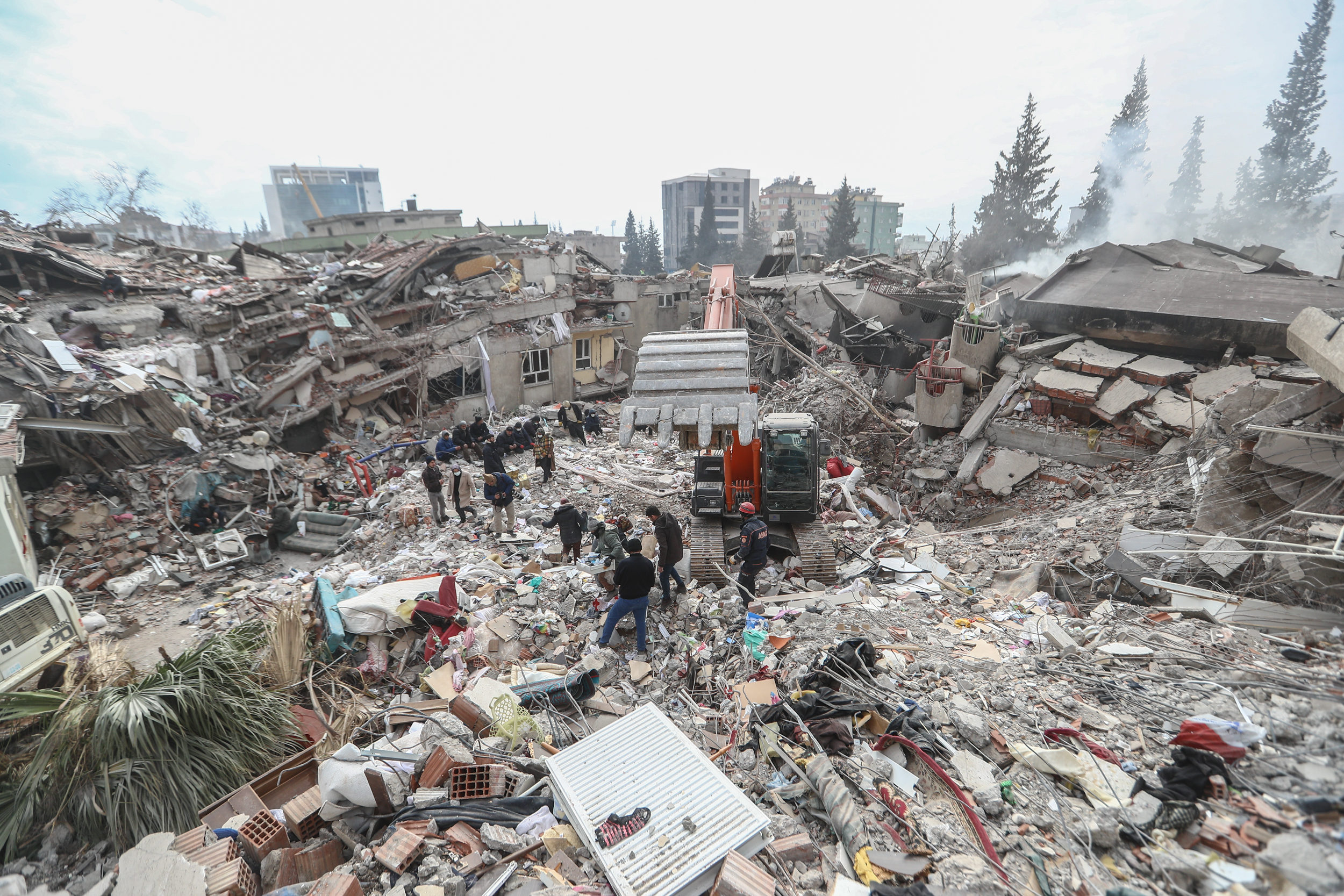
The 2023 Turkey–Syria earthquakes ruptured along segments of the East Anatolian Fault at supershear speeds; more than 50,000 people died in both countries.

Supershear earthquake ruptures are known to have propagated at speeds greater than the S wave velocity. These have so far all been observed during large strike-slip events. The unusually wide zone of damage caused by the 2001 Kunlun earthquake has been attributed to the effects of the sonic boom developed in such earthquakes.

==== Slow earthquakes ====
Slow earthquake ruptures travel at unusually low velocities. A particularly dangerous form of slow earthquake is the tsunami earthquake, observed where the relatively low felt intensities, caused by the slow propagation speed of some great earthquakes, fail to alert the population of the neighboring coast, as in the 1896 Sanriku earthquake.

==== Co-seismic overpressuring and effect of pore pressure ====
During an earthquake, high temperatures can develop at the fault plane, increasing pore pressure and consequently vaporization of the groundwater already contained within the rock. In the coseismic phase, such an increase can significantly affect slip evolution and speed, in the post-seismic phase it can control the Aftershock sequence because, after the main event, pore pressure increase slowly propagates into the surrounding fracture network. From the point of view of the Mohr-Coulomb strength theory, an increase in fluid pressure reduces the normal stress acting on the fault plane that holds it in place, and fluids can exert a lubricating effect. As thermal overpressurization may provide positive feedback between slip and strength fall at the fault plane, a common opinion is that it may enhance the faulting process instability. After the mainshock, the pressure gradient between the fault plane and the neighboring rock causes a fluid flow that increases pore pressure in the surrounding fracture networks; such an increase may trigger new faulting processes by reactivating adjacent faults, giving rise to aftershocks. Analogously, artificial pore pressure increase, by fluid injection in Earth's crust, may induce seismicity.

=== Tidal forces ===
Tides may trigger some seismicity.

=== Clusters ===
Most earthquakes form part of a sequence, related to each other in terms of location and time. Most earthquake clusters consist of small tremors that cause little to no damage, but there is a theory that earthquakes can recur in a regular pattern. Earthquake clustering has been observed, for example, in Parkfield, California where a long-term research study is being conducted around the Parkfield earthquake cluster. The quantitative analysis of these sequences is the primary focus of statistical seismology.

==== Aftershocks ====
Magnitude of the Central Italy earthquakes of August and October 2016 and January 2017 and the aftershocks (which continued to occur after the period shown here)

An aftershock is an earthquake that occurs after a previous earthquake, the mainshock. Rapid changes of stress between rocks, and the stress from the original earthquake are the main causes of these aftershocks, along with the crust around the ruptured fault plane as it adjusts to the effects of the mainshock. An aftershock is in the same region as the main shock but always of a smaller magnitude, however, they can still be powerful enough to cause even more damage to buildings that were already previously damaged from the mainshock. If an aftershock is larger than the mainshock, the aftershock is redesignated as the mainshock and the original main shock is redesignated as a foreshock. Aftershocks are formed as the crust around the displaced fault plane adjusts to the effects of the mainshock.

==== Swarms ====
Earthquake swarms are sequences of earthquakes striking in a specific area within a short period. They are different from earthquakes followed by a series of aftershocks by the fact that no single earthquake in the sequence is the main shock, so none has a notably higher magnitude than another. An example of an earthquake swarm is the 2004 activity at Yellowstone National Park. In August 2012, a swarm of earthquakes shook Southern California's Imperial Valley, showing the most recorded activity in the area since the 1970s.

Sometimes a series of earthquakes occur in what has been called an earthquake storm, where the earthquakes strike a fault in clusters, each triggered by the shaking or stress redistribution of the previous earthquakes. Similar to aftershocks but on adjacent segments of fault, these storms occur over the course of years, with some of the later earthquakes as damaging as the early ones. Such a pattern was observed in the sequence of about a dozen earthquakes that struck the North Anatolian Fault in Turkey in the 20th century and has been inferred for older anomalous clusters of large earthquakes in the Middle East.

=== Frequency ===
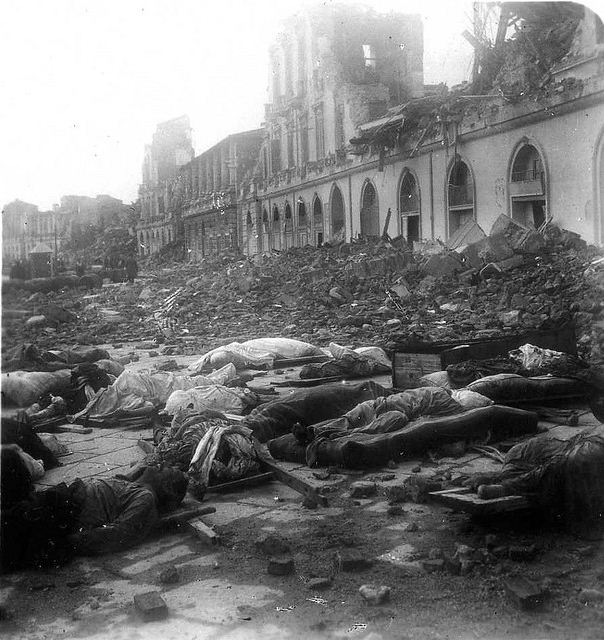
The Messina earthquake and tsunami took about 80,000 lives on December 28, 1908, in Sicily and Calabria.

It is estimated that around 500,000 earthquakes occur each year, detectable with current instrumentation. About 100,000 of these can be felt. Minor earthquakes occur very frequently around the world in places like California and Alaska in the U.S., as well as in El Salvador, Mexico, Guatemala, Chile, Peru, Indonesia, the Philippines, Iran, Pakistan, the Azores in Portugal, Turkey, New Zealand, Greece, Italy, India, Nepal, and Japan. Larger earthquakes occur less frequently, the relationship being exponential; for example, roughly ten times as many earthquakes larger than magnitude 4 occur than earthquakes larger than magnitude 5. In the (low seismicity) United Kingdom, for example, it has been calculated that the average recurrences are: an earthquake of 3.7–4.6 every year, an earthquake of 4.7–5.5 every 10 years, and an earthquake of 5.6 or larger every 100 years. This is an example of the Gutenberg–Richter law.

The number of seismic stations has increased from about 350 in 1931 to many thousands today. As a result, many more earthquakes are reported than in the past, but this is because of the vast improvement in instrumentation, rather than an increase in the number of earthquakes. The United States Geological Survey (USGS) estimates that, since 1900, there have been an average of 18 major earthquakes (magnitude 7.0–7.9) and one great earthquake (magnitude 8.0 or greater) per year, and that this average has been relatively stable. In recent years, the number of major earthquakes per year has decreased, though this is probably a statistical fluctuation rather than a systematic trend. More detailed statistics on the size and frequency of earthquakes is available from the United States Geological Survey. A recent increase in the number of major earthquakes has been noted, which could be explained by a cyclical pattern of periods of intense tectonic activity, interspersed with longer periods of low intensity. However, accurate recordings of earthquakes only began in the early 1900s, so it is too early to categorically state that this is the case.

Most of the world's earthquakes (90%, and 81% of the largest) take place in the 40,000-kilometre-long (25,000 mi), horseshoe-shaped zone called the circum-Pacific seismic belt, known as the Pacific Ring of Fire, which for the most part bounds the Pacific plate. Massive earthquakes tend to occur along other plate boundaries too, such as along the Himalayan Mountains. On top of that, under certain conditions, mountains have been shown to amplify seismic activity on ridges due to their ground surface topography.

With the rapid growth of mega-cities such as Mexico City, Tokyo, and Tehran in areas of high seismic risk, some seismologists are warning that a single earthquake may claim the lives of up to three million people.

=== Induced seismicity ===
While most earthquakes are caused by the movement of the Earth's tectonic plates, human activity can also produce earthquakes. Activities both above ground and below may change the stresses and strains on the crust, including building reservoirs, extracting resources such as coal or oil, and injecting fluids underground for waste disposal or fracking. Most of these earthquakes have small magnitudes. The 5.7 magnitude 2011 Oklahoma earthquake is thought to have been caused by disposing wastewater from oil production into injection wells, and studies point to the state's oil industry as the cause of other earthquakes in the past century. A Columbia University paper suggested that the 8.0 magnitude 2008 Sichuan earthquake was induced by loading from the Zipingpu Dam, though the link has not been conclusively proved.

== Measurement and location ==
The instrumental scales used to describe the size of an earthquake began with the Richter scale in the 1930s. It is a relatively simple measurement of an event's amplitude, and its use has become minimal in the 21st century. Seismic waves travel through the Earth's interior and can be recorded by seismometers at great distances. The surface-wave magnitude was developed in the 1950s as a means to measure remote earthquakes and to improve the accuracy for larger events. The moment magnitude scale not only measures the amplitude of the shock but also takes into account the seismic moment (total rupture area, average slip of the fault, and rigidity of the rock). The Japan Meteorological Agency seismic intensity scale, the Medvedev–Sponheuer–Karnik scale, and the Mercalli intensity scale are based on the observed effects and are related to the intensity of shaking.

=== Intensity and magnitude ===
The shaking of the earth is a common phenomenon that has been experienced by humans from the earliest of times. Before the development of strong-motion accelerometers, the intensity of a seismic event was estimated based on the observed effects. Magnitude and intensity are not directly related and calculated using different methods. The magnitude of an earthquake is a single value that describes the size of the earthquake at its source. Intensity is the measure of shaking at different locations around the earthquake. Intensity values vary from place to place, depending on the distance from the earthquake and the underlying rock or soil makeup.

The first scale for measuring earthquake magnitudes was developed by Charles Francis Richter in 1935. Subsequent scales (seismic magnitude scales) have retained a key feature, where each unit represents a ten-fold difference in the amplitude of the ground shaking and a 32-fold difference in energy. Subsequent scales are also adjusted to have approximately the same numeric value within the limits of the scale.

Although the mass media commonly reports earthquake magnitudes as "Richter magnitude" or "Richter scale", standard practice by most seismological authorities is to express an earthquake's strength on the moment magnitude scale, which is based on the actual energy released by an earthquake, the static seismic moment.

=== Seismic waves ===
Every earthquake produces different types of seismic waves, which travel through rock with different velocities:

- Longitudinal P waves (shock- or pressure waves)
- Transverse S waves (both body waves)
- Surface waves – (Rayleigh and Love waves)

==== Speed of seismic waves ====
Propagation velocity of the seismic waves through solid rock ranges from approx. 3 km/s (1.9 mi/s) up to 13 km/s (8.1 mi/s), depending on the density and elasticity of the medium. In the Earth's interior, the shock- or P waves travel much faster than the S waves (approx. relation 1.7:1). The differences in travel time from the epicenter to the observatory are a measure of the distance and can be used to image both sources of earthquakes and structures within the Earth. Also, the depth of the hypocenter can be computed roughly.

P wave speed

- Upper crust soils and unconsolidated sediments: 2–3 km (1.2–1.9 mi) per second
- Upper crust solid rock: 3–6 km (1.9–3.7 mi) per second
- Lower crust: 6–7 km (3.7–4.3 mi) per second
- Deep mantle: 13 km (8.1 mi) per second.

S waves speed

- Light sediments: 2–3 km (1.2–1.9 mi) per second
- Earth's crust: 4–5 km (2.5–3.1 mi) per second
- Deep mantle: 7 km (4.3 mi) per second

==== Seismic wave arrival ====
As a consequence, the first waves of a distant earthquake arrive at an observatory via the Earth's mantle.

On average, the kilometer distance to the earthquake is the number of seconds between the P- and S wave arrival times, multiplied by 8. Slight deviations are caused by inhomogeneities of subsurface structure. By such analysis of seismograms, the Earth's core was located in 1913 by Beno Gutenberg.

S waves and later arriving surface waves do most of the damage compared to P waves. P waves squeeze and expand the material in the same direction they are traveling, whereas S waves shake the ground up and down and back and forth.

=== Location and reporting ===
Earthquakes are not only categorized by their magnitude but also by the place where they occur. The world is divided into 754 Flinn–Engdahl regions (F-E regions), which are based on political and geographical boundaries as well as seismic activity. More active zones are divided into smaller F-E regions whereas less active zones belong to larger F-E regions.

Standard reporting of earthquakes includes its magnitude, date and time of occurrence, geographic coordinates of its epicenter, depth of the epicenter, geographical region, distances to population centers, location uncertainty, several parameters that are included in USGS earthquake reports (number of stations reporting, number of observations, etc.), and a unique event ID.

Although relatively slow seismic waves have traditionally been used to detect earthquakes, scientists realized in 2016 that gravitational measurement could provide instantaneous detection of earthquakes, and confirmed this by analyzing gravitational records associated with the 2011 Tohoku-Oki ("Fukushima") earthquake.

== Effects ==
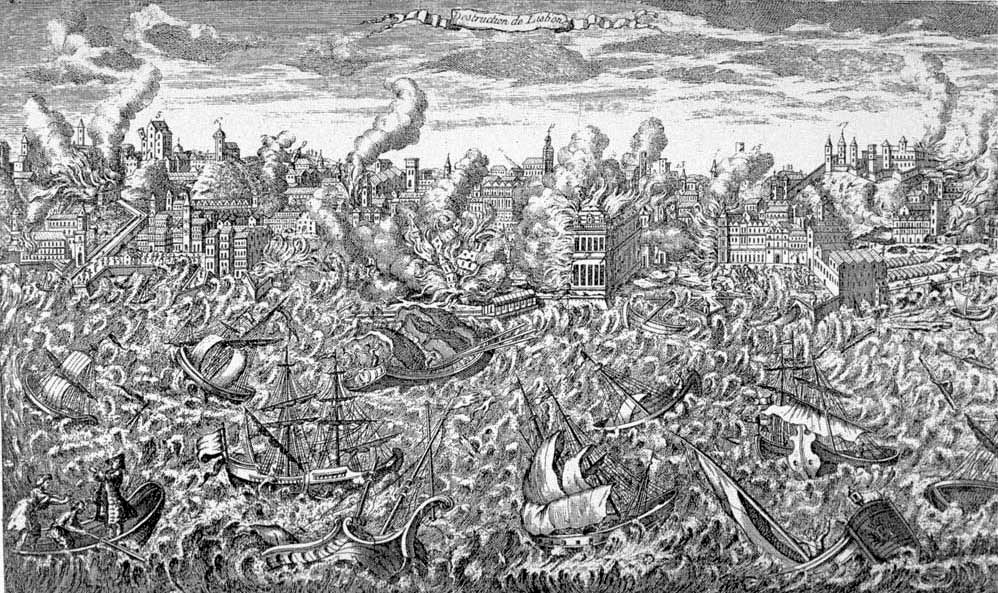
1755 copper engraving depicting Lisbon in ruins and in flames after the 1755 Lisbon earthquake, which killed an estimated 60,000 people. A tsunami overwhelms the ships in the harbor.

The effects of earthquakes include, but are not limited to, the following:

=== Shaking and ground rupture ===
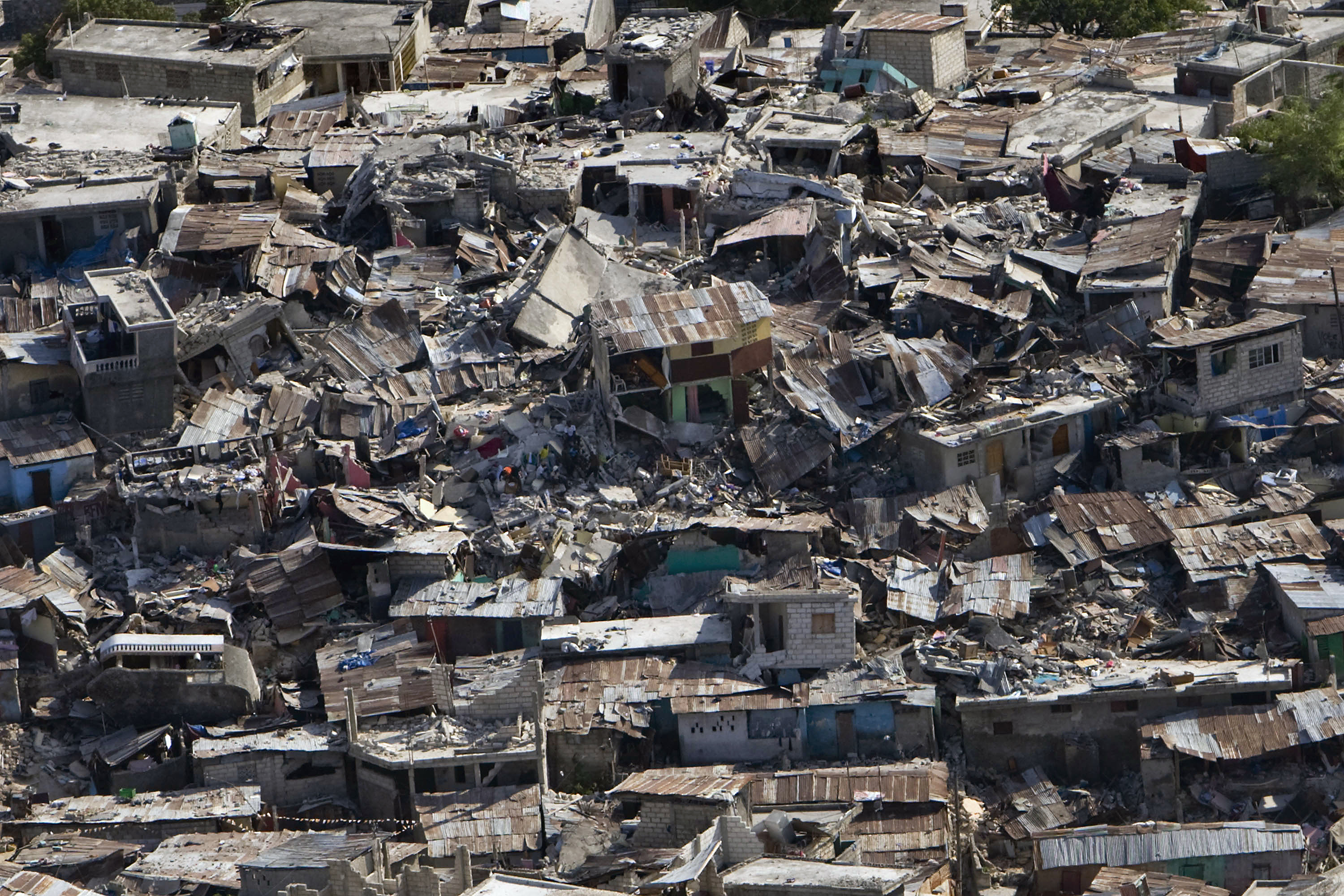
Damaged buildings in Port-au-Prince, Haiti, January 2010

Shaking and ground rupture are the main effects created by earthquakes, principally resulting in more or less severe damage to buildings and other rigid structures. The severity of the local effects depends on the complex combination of the earthquake magnitude, the distance from the epicenter, and the local geological and geomorphological conditions, which may amplify or reduce wave propagation. The ground-shaking is measured by ground acceleration.

Specific local geological, geomorphological, and geostructural features can induce high levels of shaking on the ground surface even from low-intensity earthquakes. This effect is called site or local amplification. It is principally due to the transfer of the seismic motion from hard deep soils to soft superficial soils and the effects of seismic energy focalization owing to the typical geometrical setting of such deposits.

Ground rupture is a visible breaking and displacement of the Earth's surface along the trace of the fault, which may be of the order of several meters in the case of major earthquakes. Ground rupture is a major risk for large engineering structures such as dams, bridges, and nuclear power stations and requires careful mapping of existing faults to identify any that are likely to break the ground surface within the life of the structure.

=== Soil liquefaction ===
Soil liquefaction occurs when, because of the shaking, water-saturated granular material (such as sand) temporarily loses its strength and transforms from a solid to a liquid. Soil liquefaction may cause rigid structures, like buildings and bridges, to tilt or sink into the liquefied deposits. For example, in the 1964 Alaska earthquake, soil liquefaction caused many buildings to sink into the ground, eventually collapsing upon themselves.

=== Human impacts ===
Earthquake deaths by country over time

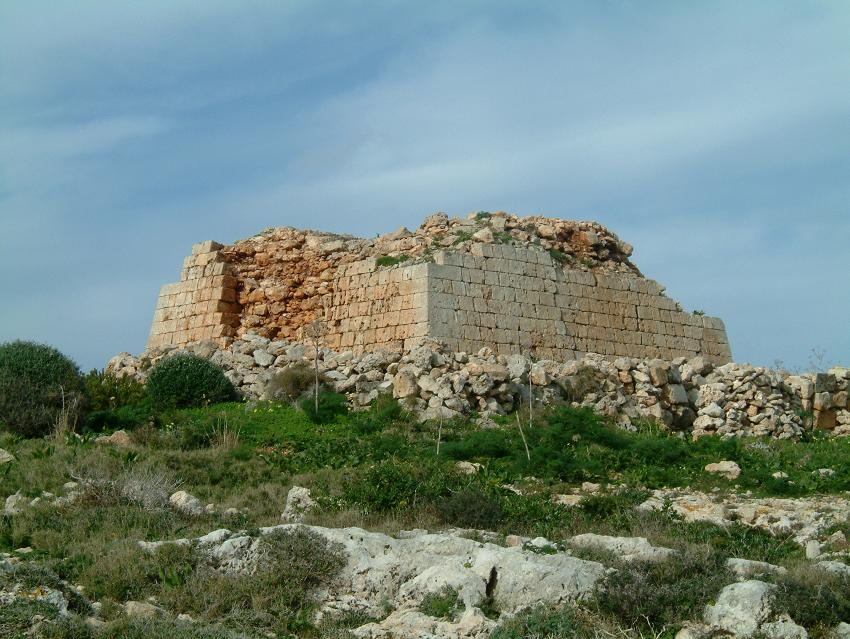
Ruins of the Għajn Ħadid Tower, which collapsed during the 1856 Heraklion earthquake

Physical damage from an earthquake will vary depending on the intensity of shaking in a given area and the type of population. Underserved and developing communities frequently experience more severe impacts (and longer lasting) from a seismic event compared to well-developed communities. Impacts may include:

- Injuries and loss of life
- Damage to critical infrastructure (short and long-term)
  - Roads, bridges, and public transportation networks
  - Water, power, sewer and gas interruption
  - Communication systems
- Loss of critical community services including hospitals, police, and fire
- General property damage
- Collapse or destabilization (potentially leading to future collapse) of buildings

With these impacts and others, the aftermath may bring disease, a lack of basic necessities, mental consequences such as panic attacks and depression to survivors, and higher insurance premiums. Recovery times will vary based on the level of damage and the socioeconomic status of the impacted community.

It has been calculated by the Food and Agriculture Organization of the United Nations that earthquakes had caused US$336 billion of damage between 1991 and 2023. While earthquakes may not directly destroy crops in the same manner as floods or storms, they can cause severe damage to agricultural processing facilities, storage infrastructure, irrigation systems and livestock housing, creating cascading effects throughout agricultural supply chains.

=== Landslides ===
China stood out in several categories in a study group of 162 earthquakes (from 1772 to 2021) that included landslide fatalities. Due to the 2008 Sichuan earthquake, it had 42% of all landslide fatalities within the study (total event deaths were higher). They were followed by Peru (22%) from the 1970 Ancash earthquake, and Pakistan (21%) from the 2005 Kashmir earthquake. China was also on top with the highest area affected by landslides with more than 80,000 km^{2}, followed by Canada with 66,000 km^{2} (1988 Saguenay and 1946 Vancouver Island). Strike-slip (61 events) was the dominant fault type listed, followed closely by thrust/reverse (57), and normal (33).

=== Fires ===
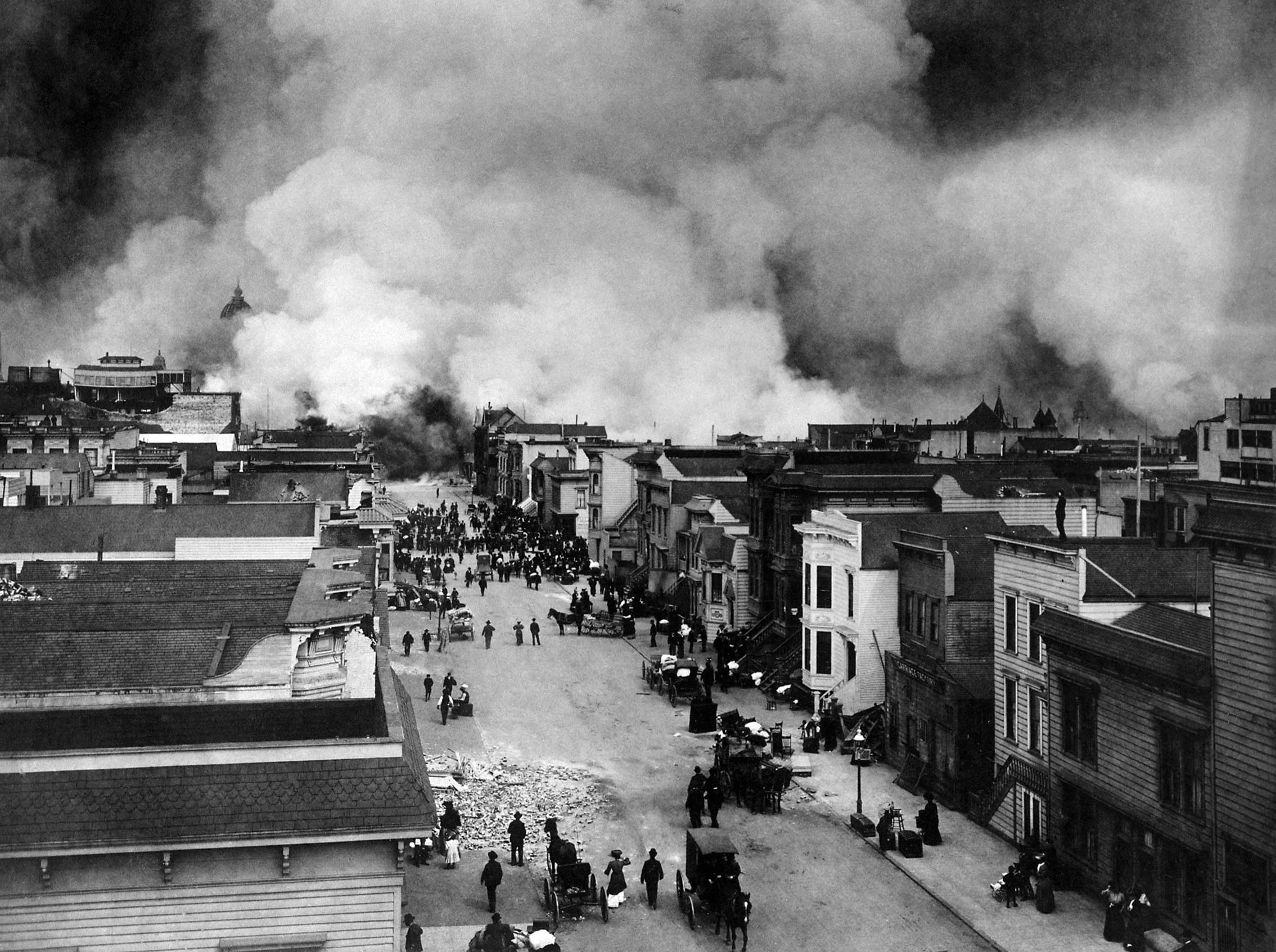
Fires of the 1906 San Francisco earthquake

Earthquakes can cause fires by damaging electrical power or gas lines. In the event of water mains rupturing and a loss of pressure, it may also become difficult to stop the spread of a fire once it has started. For example, more deaths in the 1906 San Francisco earthquake were caused by fire than by the earthquake itself.

=== Tsunami ===
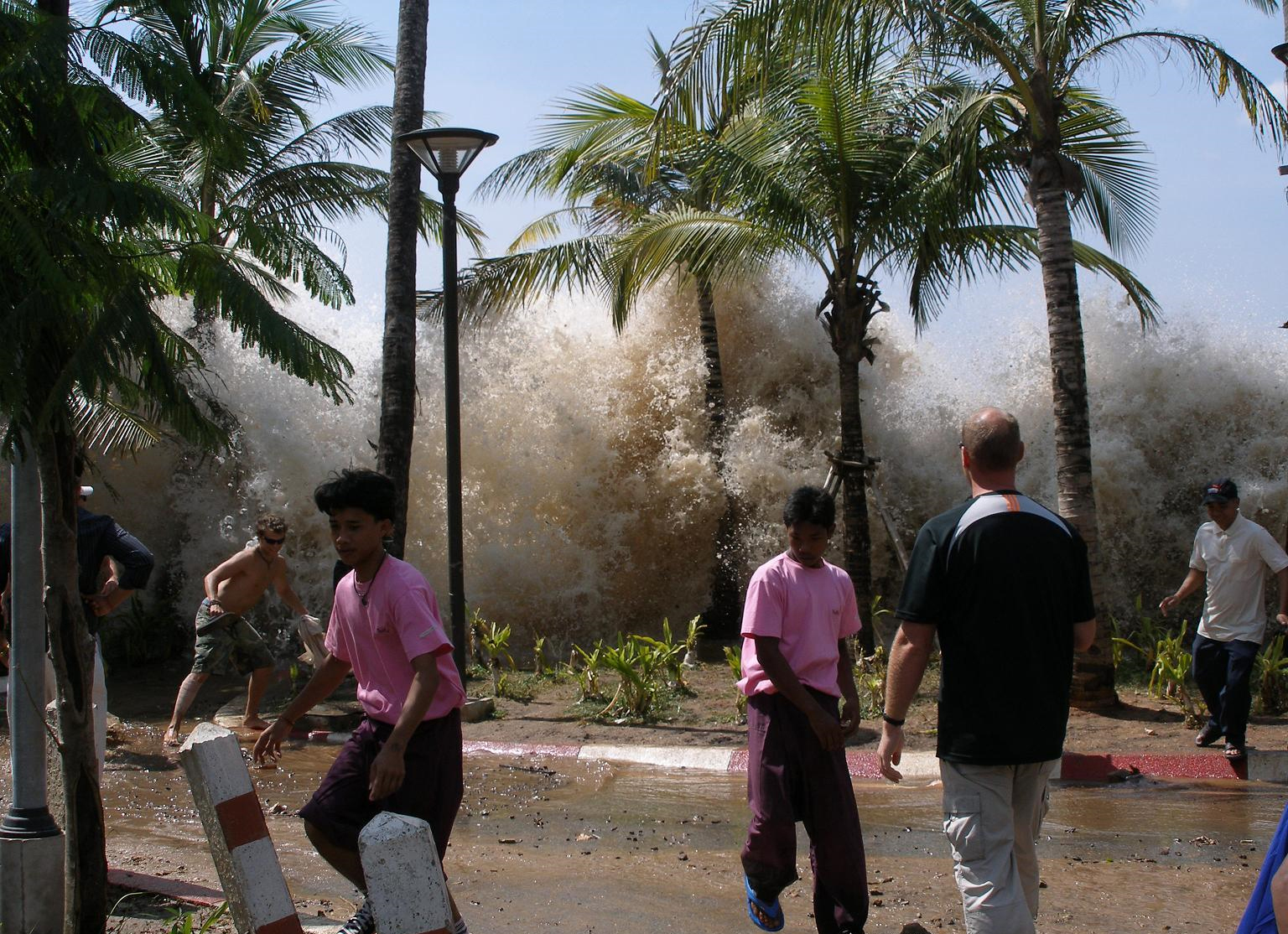
The tsunami of the 2004 Indian Ocean earthquake

Tsunamis are long-wavelength, long-period sea waves produced by the sudden or abrupt movement of large volumes of water—including when an earthquake occurs at sea. In the open ocean, the distance between wave crests can surpass 100 kilometres (62 mi), and the wave periods can vary from five minutes to one hour. Such tsunamis travel 600–800 kilometers per hour (373–497 miles per hour), depending on water depth. Large waves produced by an earthquake or a submarine landslide can overrun nearby coastal areas in a matter of minutes. Tsunamis can also travel thousands of kilometers across open ocean and wreak destruction on far shores hours after the earthquake that generated them.

Ordinarily, subduction earthquakes under magnitude 7.5 do not cause tsunamis, although some instances of this have been recorded. Most destructive tsunamis are caused by earthquakes of magnitude 7.5 or more.

=== Floods ===
Floods may be secondary effects of earthquakes if dams are damaged. Earthquakes may cause landslips to dam rivers, which collapse and cause floods.

The terrain below the Sarez Lake in Tajikistan is in danger of catastrophic flooding if the landslide dam formed by the earthquake, known as the Usoi Dam, were to fail during a future earthquake. Impact projections suggest the flood could affect roughly five million people.

== Management ==
=== Prediction ===
Earthquake prediction is a branch of the science of seismology concerned with the specification of the time, location, and magnitude of future earthquakes within stated limits. Many methods have been developed for predicting the time and place in which earthquakes will occur. Despite considerable research efforts by seismologists, scientifically reproducible predictions cannot yet be made to a specific day or month. Popular belief holds earthquakes are preceded by earthquake weather, in the early morning.

=== Forecasting ===
While forecasting is usually considered to be a type of prediction, earthquake forecasting is often differentiated from earthquake prediction. Earthquake forecasting is concerned with the probabilistic assessment of general earthquake hazards, including the frequency and magnitude of damaging earthquakes in a given area over years or decades. For well-understood faults the probability that a segment may rupture during the next few decades can be estimated.

Earthquake warning systems have been developed that can provide regional notification of an earthquake in progress, but before the ground surface has begun to move, potentially allowing people within the system's range to seek shelter before the earthquake's impact is felt.

=== Preparedness ===
The objective of earthquake engineering is to foresee the impact of earthquakes on buildings, bridges, tunnels, roadways, and other structures, and to design such structures to minimize the risk of damage. Existing structures can be modified by seismic retrofitting to improve their resistance to earthquakes. Earthquake insurance can provide building owners with financial protection against losses resulting from earthquakes. Emergency management strategies can be employed by a government or organization to mitigate risks and prepare for consequences.

Artificial intelligence may help to assess buildings and plan precautionary operations. The Igor expert system is part of a mobile laboratory that supports the procedures leading to the seismic assessment of masonry buildings and the planning of retrofitting operations on them. It has been applied to assess buildings in Lisbon, Rhodes, and Naples.

Individuals can also take preparedness steps like securing water heaters and heavy items that could injure someone, locating shutoffs for utilities, and being educated about what to do when the shaking starts. For areas near large bodies of water, earthquake preparedness encompasses the possibility of a tsunami caused by a large earthquake.

== In culture ==
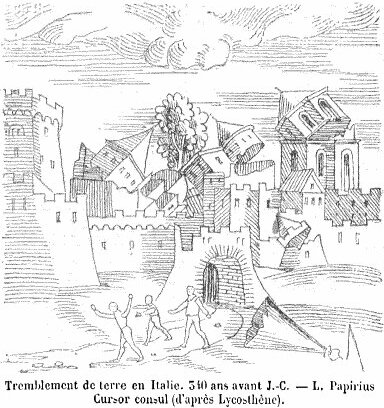
An image from a 1557 book depicting an earthquake in Italy in the 4th century BCE

From the lifetime of the Greek philosopher Anaxagoras in the 5th century BCE to the 14th century CE, earthquakes were usually attributed to "air (vapors) in the cavities of the Earth." Pliny the Elder called earthquakes "underground thunderstorms". Thales of Miletus (625–547 BCE) was the only documented person who believed that earthquakes were caused by tension between the earth and water.

In Norse mythology, earthquakes were explained as the violent struggle of the god Loki being punished for the murder of Baldr, god of beauty and light. In Greek mythology, Poseidon was the cause and god of earthquakes. In Japanese mythology, Namazu (鯰) is a giant catfish who causes earthquakes. In Taiwanese folklore, the Tē-gû (地牛) is a giant earth buffalo who causes earthquakes.

In the New Testament, Matthew's Gospel refers to earthquakes occurring both after the death of Jesus (Matthew 27:51, 54) and at his resurrection (Matthew 28:2).

In modern popular culture, the portrayal of earthquakes is shaped by the memory of great cities laid waste, such as Kobe in 1995 or San Francisco in 1906. Fictional earthquakes tend to strike suddenly and without warning. For this reason, stories about earthquakes generally begin with the disaster and focus on its immediate aftermath, as in Short Walk to Daylight (1972), The Ragged Edge (1968) or Aftershock: Earthquake in New York (1999). A notable example is Heinrich von Kleist's classic novella, The Earthquake in Chile, which describes the destruction of Santiago in 1647. Haruki Murakami's short fiction collection After the Quake depicts the consequences of the Kobe earthquake of 1995.

The most popular single earthquake in fiction is the hypothetical "Big One" expected of California's San Andreas Fault someday, as depicted in the novels Richter 10 (1996), Goodbye California (1977), 2012 (2009), and San Andreas (2015), among other works.

== Outside of Earth ==
Phenomena similar to earthquakes have been observed on other planets such as Mars or the Moon; see marsquakes and moonquakes. There are even quakes on stars, as well as neutron stars which are a type of stellar remnant following a supernova on a high mass star. One such starquake was from a neutron star named SGR 1806−20, located approximately halfway across the Milky Way from Earth, which approximately 42,000 years ago had such a quake and by the time the light from the starquake reached Earth in 2004, it was determined to have released more energy than the Sun releases in 150,000 years.

== See also ==
- Statistical seismology - the study of earthquake patterns using stochastic modeling.
- Alpide belt – Belt of Eurasian mountain ranges
- European-Mediterranean Seismological Centre (EMSC), also known as Centre Sismologique Euro-Méditerranéen
- Helioseismology – Study of the structure and dynamics of the Sun through its oscillation
- Injection well – Device that places fluid deep underground
- IRIS Consortium – Former research group using seismographic data
- Lists of earthquakes
- Seismological Society of America (SSA) – International scientific society
- Seismotectonics
- Vertical displacement – Vertical shift of land in plate tectonics

== Sources ==
This article incorporates text from a free content work. Licensed under CC BY 4.0 (license statement/permission). Text taken from The Impact of Disasters on Agriculture and Food Security 2025, The Food and Agriculture Organization of the United Nations.

== Sources ==
- Allen, Clarence R. (December 1976), "Responsibilities in earthquake prediction", Bulletin of the Seismological Society of America, 66 (6): 2069–2074, Bibcode:1976BuSSA..66.2069A, doi:10.1785/BSSA0660062069.
- Bolt, Bruce A. (1993), Earthquakes and geological discovery, Scientific American Library, ISBN 978-0-7167-5040-6.
- Chung, D.H.; Bernreuter, D.L. (1980), Regional Relationships Among Earthquake Magnitude Scales, doi:10.2172/5073993, OSTI 5073993, archived from the original on 2020-01-22, NUREG/CR-1457.
- Deborah R. Coen. The Earthquake Observers: Disaster Science From Lisbon to Richter (University of Chicago Press; 2012) 348 pages; explores both scientific and popular coverage
- Geller, Robert J.; Jackson, David D.; Kagan, Yan Y.; Mulargia, Francesco (14 March 1997), "Earthquakes Cannot Be Predicted" (PDF), Science, 275 (5306): 1616, doi:10.1126/science.275.5306.1616, S2CID 123516228, archived from the original (PDF) on 12 May 2019.
- International Commission on Earthquake Forecasting for Civil Protection (30 May 2011), "Operational Earthquake Forecasting: State of Knowledge and Guidelines for Utilization" (PDF), Annals of Geophysics, 54 (4) 2: 315–391, Bibcode:2011AnGp...54.5350J, doi:10.4401/ag-5350, S2CID 129825964, archived (PDF) from the original on 17 July 2021.
- Kanamori, Hiroo (2003), "72 Earthquake prediction: An overview", in William H.K. Lee; Hiroo Kanamori; Paul C. Jennings; Carl Kisslinger (eds.), International Handbook of Earthquake and Engineering Seismology, Part B, International Geophysics, vol. 81, Part B, pp. 1205–1216, Bibcode:2003InGeo..81.1205K, doi:10.1016/s0074-6142(03)80186-9, ISBN 978-0-12-440658-2.
- Wood, H.O.; Gutenberg, B. (6 September 1935), "Earthquake prediction", Science, 82 (2123): 219–320, Bibcode:1935Sci....82..219W, doi:10.1126/science.82.2123.219, PMID 17818812.
