= Gutenberg–Richter law =

Law in seismology describing earthquake frequency and magnitude

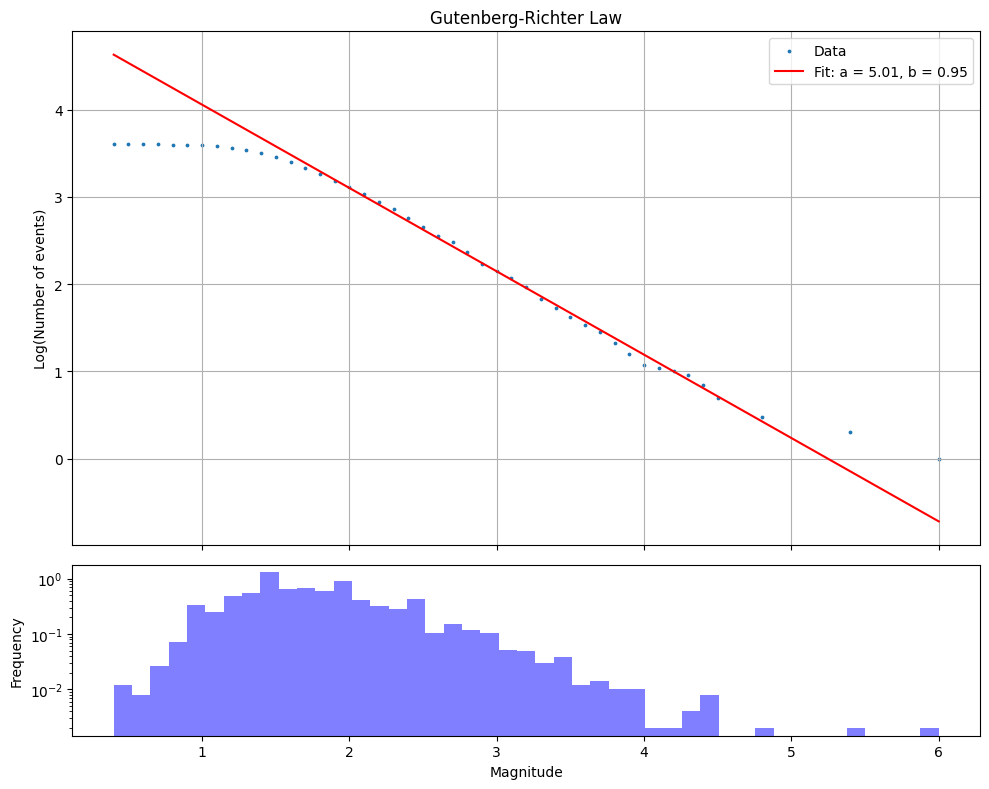
Gutenberg–Richter law fitted to the aftershocks of the August 2016 Central Italy earthquake, during the Aug 22 – Sep 1 period. Notice that the linear fit fails at the upper and lower end, due to lack of registered events. Since the recording period is only 10 days, events of magnitude greater than 6 has not yet appeared. Since the recording devices are unable to detect earthquake events near or below the background noise level, most of the events with magnitude lower than 1.5 are not detected.

In seismology, the Gutenberg–Richter law (GR law) expresses the relationship between the magnitude and total number of earthquakes in any given region and time period of at least that magnitude.

$$\log_{10} N = a - b M$$

or

$$N = 10^{a - b M}$$

where

- $N$ is the number of events having a magnitude $\ge M$,
- $a$ and $b$ are constants, i.e. they are the same for all values of $N$ and $M$.

Since magnitude is logarithmic, this is an instance of the Pareto distribution.

The Gutenberg–Richter law is also widely used for acoustic emission analysis due to a close resemblance of acoustic emission phenomenon to seismogenesis.

== Background ==
The relationship between earthquake magnitude and frequency was first proposed by Charles Francis Richter and Beno Gutenberg in a 1944 paper studying earthquakes in California, and generalised in a worldwide study in 1949. This relationship between event magnitude and frequency of occurrence is remarkably common, although the values of a and b may vary significantly from region to region or over time.

GR law plotted for various b-values

The parameter b (commonly referred to as the "b-value") is commonly close to 1.0 in seismically active regions. This means that for a given frequency of magnitude 4.0 or larger events there will be 10 times as many magnitude 3.0 or larger quakes and 100 times as many magnitude 2.0 or larger quakes. There is some variation of b-values in the approximate range of 0.5 to 2 depending on the source environment of the region. A notable example of this is during earthquake swarms when b can become as high as 2.5, thus indicating a very high proportion of small earthquakes to large ones.

There is debate concerning the interpretation of some observed spatial and temporal variations of b-values. The most frequently cited factors to explain these variations are: the stress applied to the material, the depth, the focal mechanism, the strength heterogeneity of the material, and the proximity of macro-failure. The b-value decrease observed prior to the failure of samples deformed in the laboratory has led to the suggestion that this is a precursor to major macro-failure. Statistical physics provides a theoretical framework for explaining both the steadiness of the Gutenberg–Richter law for large catalogs and its evolution when the macro-failure is approached, but application to earthquake forecasting is currently out of reach. Alternatively, a b-value significantly different from 1.0 may suggest a problem with the data set; e.g. it is incomplete or contains errors in calculating magnitude.

Roll-off compared to ideal GR law with b=1

Magnitude of the August 2016 Central Italy earthquake (red dot) and aftershocks (which continued to occur after the period shown here)

There is an apparent b-value decrease for smaller magnitude event ranges in all empirical catalogues of earthquakes. This effect is described as "roll-off" of the b-value, a description due to the plot of the logarithmic version of the GR law becoming flatter at the low magnitude end of the plot. This may in large part be caused by incompleteness of any data set due to the inability to detect and characterize small events. That is, many low-magnitude earthquakes are not catalogued because fewer stations detect and record them due to decreasing instrumental signal to noise levels. Some modern models of earthquake dynamics, however, predict a physical roll-off in the earthquake size distribution.

The a-value represents the total seismicity rate of the region. This is more easily seen when the GR law is expressed in terms of the total number of events:

$$N = N_\mathrm {TOT} 10^{-bM} \$$

where

$$N_\mathrm {TOT} = 10^a, \$$

the total number of events (above M=0). Since $10^a \$ is the total number of events, $10^{-bM} \$ must be the probability of those events.

Modern attempts to understand the law involve theories of self-organized criticality or self similarity.

== Generalization ==
New models show a generalization of the original Gutenberg–Richter model. Among these is the one released by Oscar Sotolongo-Costa and A. Posadas in 2004, of which R. Silva et al. presented the following modified form in 2006,

$$\log N_{>m}=\log N+\left(\frac{2-q}{1-q}\right)\log \left[1-\left(\frac{1-q}{2-q}\right)\left(\frac{10^{2m}}{a^{2/3}}\right)\right]$$

where N is the total number of events, a is a proportionality constant and q represents the non-extensivity parameter introduced by Constantino Tsallis to characterize systems not explained by the Boltzmann–Gibbs statistical form for equilibrium physical systems.

It is possible to see in an article published by N. V. Sarlis, E. S. Skordas, and P. A. Varotsos, that above some magnitude threshold this equation reduces to original Gutenberg–Richter form with

$$b=\frac{2(2-q)}{q-1}$$

In addition, another generalization was obtained from the solution of the generalized logistic equation. In this model, values of parameter b were found for events recorded in Central Atlantic, Canary Islands, Magellan Mountains and the Sea of Japan. The generalized logistic equation is applied to acoustic emission in concrete by N. Burud and J. M. Chandra Kishen. Burud showed the b-value obtained from generalized logistic equation monotonically increases with damage and referred it as a damage compliant b-value.

A new generalization was published using Bayesian statistical techniques, from which an alternative form for parameter b of Gutenberg–Richter is presented. The model was applied to intense earthquakes occurred in Chile, from the year 2010 to the year 2016.

== Bibliography ==
- Pathikrit Bhattacharya, Bikas K Chakrabarti, Kamal, and Debashis Samanta, "Fractal models of earthquake dynamics", Heinz Georg Schuster (ed), Reviews of Nonlinear Dynamics and Complexity, pp. 107–150 V.2, Wiley-VCH, 2009 ISBN 3-527-40850-9.
- B. Gutenberg and C. F. Richter, Seismicity of the Earth and Associated Phenomena, Princeton University Press, 1949 OCLC 1323229850.
- Jon D. Pelletier, "Spring-block models of seismicity: review and analysis of a structurally heterogeneous model coupled to the viscous asthenosphere" Geocomplexity and the Physics of Earthquakes, American Geophysical Union, 2000 ISBN 0-87590-978-7.
