= Beno Gutenberg =

German-American seismologist

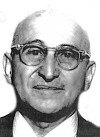
- Born: June 4, 1889; Darmstadt, Grand Duchy of Hesse, German Empire
- Died: January 25, 1960 (aged 70); Pasadena, California, U.S.
- Education: University of Göttingen
- Known for: Gutenberg discontinuity Gutenberg–Richter law Body-wave magnitude scale Surface-wave magnitude scale Low-velocity zone Microbarom
- Spouse: Hertha Gutenberg
- Awards: William Bowie Medal (1953)
- Scientific career
- Fields: Seismology
- Workplaces: California Institute of Technology
- Doctoral advisor: Emil Wiechert

Beno Gutenberg (/ˈɡuːtənbɜːrɡ/; June 4, 1889 – January 25, 1960) was a German-American seismologist who made several important contributions to the science. He was a colleague and mentor of Charles Francis Richter at the California Institute of Technology and Richter's collaborator in developing the Richter scale for measuring an earthquake's magnitude.

== Early life, family and education ==
Gutenberg was born in Darmstadt, Germany. His father owned a factory.

He obtained his doctorate in physics from the University of Göttingen in 1911. His advisor was Emil Wiechert.

== Career ==
During World War I, Gutenberg served in the German Army as a meteorologist in support of gas warfare operations.

Gutenberg held positions at the University of Strasbourg, which he lost when Strasbourg became French in 1918. After some years during which he had to sustain himself with managing his father's soap factory, he obtained in 1926 a junior professorship at University of Frankfurt-am-Main, which was poorly paid.

Although he was already one of the leading seismologists worldwide and definitely the leading seismologist in Germany during the 1920s, he was still dependent on the position in his father's factory; however, he continued his research in his spare time.

In 1928, the attempt to become the successor of his academic teacher, Emil Wiechert, in Göttingen, failed. There are hints that Gutenberg's Jewish background might have played a role because, already in the 1920s, there were strong antisemitic tendencies in German universities. For similar reasons, he was also not accepted for a professorship in Potsdam to become the successor of Gustav Angenheister.

=== Move to the US ===
Since Gutenberg could not sustain a career of scientific work in Germany, he accepted a position as Professor of Geophysics at the California Institute of Technology in Pasadena in 1930, becoming founding director of the Seismological Laboratory when it was transferred to Caltech from Carnegie. Even if he had obtained a full professorship in Germany, he would have lost it in 1933 anyway like so many other scientists of Jewish ancestry, at least 30 of whom emigrated to the United States under Gutenberg's sponsorship.

Gutenberg made the California Institute of Technology Seismological Laboratory the leading seismological institute worldwide, especially in his collaboration with Charles Francis Richter. Together, they developed a relationship between seismic magnitude and energy, represented in this equation:

$$\!\ \log E(s) = 11.8 + 1.5 M$$

which gives the energy $E(s)$ given from earthquakes from seismic waves in ergs. Another famous result, known as Gutenberg–Richter law, provides probability distribution of earthquakes for a given energy.

Gutenberg also worked on determining the depth of the core-mantle boundary as well as other properties of the interior of the earth.

In 1952, Gutenberg received the Prix Charles Lagrange from the Académie royale des Sciences, des Lettres et des Beaux-Arts de Belgique. Gutenberg remained director of the Seismological Laboratory until 1957. He was succeeded by Frank Press. He died of cancer in California at age 70.

== Personal life ==
Beno Gutenberg's personal life was marked by the challenges of immigration amidst political turmoil in Germany during the rise of the Nazi regime. Gutenberg faced challenges obtaining visas due to growing Nazi influence in the 1930s.

After leaving Germany to the United States, Beno Gutenberg and his wife, Hertha, were instrumental in aiding individuals seeking refuge from Nazi persecution during the 1930s. Among those they sponsored were former colleagues, students, and friends, including Professor Helmut Landsberg and Professor Victor Conrad. These individuals received support for their education and basic needs, ensuring they were not reliant on welfare or student loans.

Hertha Gutenberg's involvement extended beyond financial support; she played a crucial role in facilitating connections and assistance through organizations like the Catholic group in New York, which helped Professor Victor Conrad secure his relocation to the United States.

== Works ==
- Gutenberg, B (1960), "Low-Velocity Layers in the Earth, Ocean, and Atmosphere.", Science, vol. 131, no. 3405 (published Apr 1, 1960), pp. 959–965, Bibcode:1960Sci...131..959G, doi:10.1126/science.131.3405.959, PMID 17756389
- Buwalda, JP; Gutenberg, B (1935), "Investigation of overthrust faults by seismic methods", Science, vol. 81, no. 2103 (published Apr 19, 1935), pp. 384–386, Bibcode:1935Sci....81..384B, doi:10.1126/science.81.2103.384, PMID 17769434

== See also ==
- Seismicity
- Core–mantle boundary
- Lithosphere–asthenosphere boundary
- Macroseismic magnitude
- List of geophysicists
