= List of tsunamis =

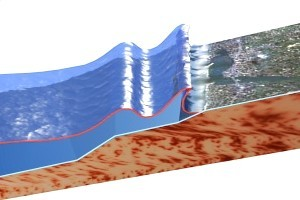
A tsunami hitting a coastline

This article lists notable tsunamis, which are sorted by the date and location that they occurred.

Because of seismic and volcanic activity associated with tectonic plate boundaries along the Pacific Ring of Fire, tsunamis occur most frequently in the Pacific Ocean, but are a worldwide natural phenomenon. They are possible wherever large bodies of water are found, including inland lakes, where they can be caused by landslides and glacier calving. Very small tsunamis, non-destructive and undetectable without specialized equipment, occur frequently as a result of minor earthquakes and other events.

Around 1600 BC, the eruption of Thira devastated Aegean sites including Akrotiri (prehistoric city). Some Minoan sites in eastern Crete may have been damaged by ensuing tsunamis.

The oldest recorded tsunami occurred in 479 BC. It destroyed a Persian army that was attacking the town of Potidaea in Greece.

As early as 426 BC, the Greek historian Thucydides inquired in his book History of the Peloponnesian War (3.89.1–6) about the causes of tsunamis. He argued that such events could only be explained as a consequence of ocean earthquakes, and could see no other possible causes.

== Prehistoric ==
| Year | Location | Main Article | Primary Cause | Description |
|---|---|---|---|---|
| ≈3,260 Ma | South Africa | S2 impact | Impact event | An astronomical object between 37 and 58 kilometres (23 and 36 mi) wide traveling at 20 kilometres per second (12 mi/s) struck the Earth east of what is now Johannesburg, South Africa, near South Africa's border with Eswatini, in what was then an Archean ocean that covered most of the planet, creating a crater about 500 kilometres (300 mi) wide. The impact generated a megatsunami that probably extended to a depth of thousands of metres beneath the surface of the ocean and rose to the height of a skyscraper when it reached shorelines. |
| ≈66 Ma | Yucatán Peninsula | Chicxulub event | Impact event | An asteroid 10 kilometres (6 mi) in diameter struck the Earth, generating a megatsunami with an initial wave height of 1,500 metres (5,000 ft) which struck coastlines in the Gulf of Mexico with waves 100 metres (330 ft) tall and reached heights of up to 14 metres (46 ft) in the North Atlantic and South Pacific. The impact also triggered giant landslides and slumps which produced additional megatsunamis of various sizes in the region, and seismic waves from it caused seiches of 10 to 100 metres (33 to 330 ft) in height in an inland sea at Tanis, 3,000 kilometres (1,900 mi) away. |
| ≈5.33 Ma | Algeciras, Spain | Zanclean Flood | Reservoir-induced seismicity | At the end of or shortly after the Zanclean Flood, which rapidly filled the Mediterranean Basin with water from the Atlantic Ocean, a megatsunami with a height of nearly 100 metres (330 ft) struck the coast of Spain near what is now Algeciras. |
| ≈1.4 Ma | Molokai, Hawaii | East Molokai Volcano | Landslide | One-third of the East Molokai volcano collapsed into the Pacific Ocean, generating a tsunami with an estimated local height of 600 metres (2,000 ft). The wave traveled as far as California and Mexico. |
| ≈220,000–170,000 BC | Tenerife, Canary Islands | Mount Teide | Eruption and landslide | A destructive series of eruptions caused a large collapse of part of the northern flank of the island and the central pre-Teide volcanic structure (known as the Cañadas edifice), causing a megatsunami in two phases, leaving deposits 132 metres (433 ft) high on the north-west of the island. |
| ≈103,000 BC | Hawaii | | Submarine landslide | A tsunami at least 400 metres (1,300 ft) in height deposited marine sediments at a modern-day elevation of 326 metres (1,070 ft) – 375 to 425 metres (1,230 to 1,394 ft) above sea level at the time the wave struck – on Lanai. The tsunami also deposited such sediments at an elevation of 60 to 80 metres (200 to 260 ft) on Oahu, Molokai, Maui, and the island of Hawaii. |
| ≈71,000 BC | Cape Verde Islands | | Landslide | The eastern flank of the island of Fogo collapsed into the sea, generating a megatsunami. The wave struck Santiago, 55 kilometres (34 mi; 30 nmi) away, where it was at least 170 metres (560 ft) tall and had a run-up height of 270 metres (890 ft). The wave deposited giant boulders on Santiago at elevations of up to 220 metres (720 ft) and as far as 650 metres (2,100 ft) inland. |
| ≈7,910–7,290 BC | Dor, Israel | | Unknown | A megatsunami had a run-up of at least 16 metres (52 ft) and traveled between 1.5 and 3.5 km (0.9 and 2.2 mi) inland from the ancient Eastern Mediterranean coast. |
| ≈7000–6000 BC | Lisbon, Portugal | | Unknown | A series of giant rocks and cobblestones have been found 14 metres (46 ft) above mean sea level near Guincho Beach. |
| ≈6370 BC | Eastern Mediterranean | | Unknown | A 25-cubic-kilometre (6 cu mi) landslide on the eastern slope of Mount Etna in Sicily reached the Mediterranean Sea and triggered a megatsunami in the Eastern Mediterranean with an initial wave height of 40 metres (130 ft) along the eastern coast of Sicily, where it felled millions of trees. Models indicate it had heights of 30 metres (100 ft) near Syracuse, Sicily; 15 to 34 metres (49 to 110 ft) along the southern coast of Italy; 20 metres (70 ft) along the southeastern coast of Sicily; 15 metres (50 ft) at the northeastern tip of Sicily; 18 metres (59 ft) at Malta; 12 metres (39 ft) on the western coast of Greece; 6 metres (20 ft) in southern Greece; 5 to 10 metres (16 to 33 ft) along the coast of Libya; 1 metre (3 ft) on the south coast of Crete; 0.5 metres (2 ft) at Cyprus; and 2.5 metres (8 ft) at the Neolithic village of Atlit Yam off the coast of Israel, prompting the village's permanent abandonment. |
| ≈6225–6170 BC | Norwegian Sea | Storegga Slide | Landslide | The Storegga Slides, 100 kilometres (60 mi) northwest of the coast of Møre in the Norwegian Sea, triggered a large tsunami in the North Atlantic Ocean. The collapse involved around 290 kilometres (180 mi) of coastal shelf, and a total volume of 3,500 km^{3} (840 cu mi) of debris. Based on carbon dating of plant material in the sediment deposited by the tsunami, the latest incident occurred around 6225–6170 BC. In Scotland, traces of the tsunami have been found in sediments from Montrose Basin, the Firth of Forth, up to 80 kilometres (50 mi) inland and 4 metres (13 ft) above current normal tide levels. |
| ≈5650 BC | Alluttoq Island, Greenland | | Landslide | A large landslide into Sullorsuaq Strait (known in Danish as Vaigat Strait) generated a megatsunami which had a run-up height of 41 to 66 metres (130 to 220 ft). |
| ≈5350 BC | Alluttoq Island, Greenland | | Landslide | A large landslide into Sullorsuaq Strait (known in Danish as Vaigat Strait) generated a megatsunami which had a run-up height of 45 to 70 metres (148 to 230 ft). |
| 5,500 BP | Northern Isles, Scotland | Garth tsunami | Unknown | The tsunami may have been responsible for contemporary mass burials. |
| ≈1800 BC | Chile | | Earthquake | A magnitude 9.5 earthquake generated tsunamis 15 to 20 metres (50 to 70 ft) in height that struck 1,000 kilometres (621 mi) of the coastline of the Atacama Desert. People fled the area and did not begin to return until around 800 BC; some pre-tsunami settlements were not reoccupied until between 1000 and 1500 AD. |
| ≈1600 BC | Santorini, Greece | Minoan eruption | Volcanic eruption | The volcanic eruption in Santorini, Greece triggered tsunamis which caused damage to some Minoan sites in eastern Crete. |
| 1171 BC | Baltic Sea | | Unknown | A tsunami with wave heights of at least 10 metres (30 ft) had run-up heights in Sweden of up to 14.5 to 16.5 metres (48 to 54 ft). |
| ≈1100 BC | Lake Crescent, Washington, United States | | Landslide | An earthquake generated the 7,200,000-cubic-metre (9,400,000 cu yd) Sledgehammer Point Rockslide, which fell from Mount Storm King and entered waters at least 140 metres (460 ft) deep, generating a megatsunami with an estimated maximum run-up height of 82 to 104 metres (270 to 340 ft). |

== Before 1000 AD ==
| Year | Location | Main Article | Primary Cause | Description |
|---|---|---|---|---|
| 479 BC | Potidaea, Greece | 479 BC Potidaea earthquake | | The oldest recorded tsunami in history. During the Persian siege of the maritime city of Potidaea, Greece, Herodotus reports how Persian attackers attempting to take advantage of an unusual retreat of the water were suddenly surprised by "a great tide, higher, as the locals say, than any one of many that had been before". Herodotus attributes the cause of the flash flood to Poseidon's wrath. |
| 426 BC | Malian Gulf, Greece | 426 BC Malian Gulf tsunami | | In the summer of 426 BC, a tsunami struck the gulf between the northwestern tip of Euboea and Lamia. The Greek historian Thucydides (3.89.1–6) described how the tsunami and a series of earthquakes affected the Peloponnesian War (431–404 BC) and, for the first time, associated earthquakes with waves in terms of cause and effect. |
| 373 BC | Helike, Greece | | Earthquake | An earthquake and a tsunami destroyed the prosperous Greek city of Helike, 2 km (1.2 mi) from the sea. The fate of the city, which remained permanently submerged, was often commented on by ancient writers and may have inspired contemporary Plato to create the myth of Atlantis. |
| 60 BC | Portugal and Galicia | | Earthquake | An earthquake of intensity IX and an estimated magnitude of 6.7 caused a tsunami on the coasts of Portugal and Galicia. Little else is known due to the paucity of records of Roman possession of the Iberian Peninsula. |
| 79 AD | Gulf of Naples, Italy | Eruption of Mount Vesuvius in 79 AD | Volcanic eruption | Pliny the Younger witnessed a smaller tsunami in the Bay of Naples during the eruption of Mount Vesuvius on 24 October 79 AD. |
| 115 AD | Caesarea, Israel | 115 Antioch earthquake | Earthquake | Underwater geoarchaeological excavations on the shallow shelf – around 10 metres (30 ft) depth – at Caesarea, Israel, documented a tsunami hitting the ancient port. Talmudic sources record a tsunami on 13 December 115 AD that affected Caesarea and Yavneh. The tsunami was likely triggered by an earthquake that destroyed Antioch, and was generated somewhere along the Cyprian Arch fault system. |
| 262 AD | Southwest Anatolia (Turkey) | 262 Southwest Anatolia earthquake | Earthquake | Many cities were inundated by the sea, with cities in Roman Asia reporting the worst tsunami damage. In many places fissures appeared in the earth and filled with water; in others, towns were inundated by the sea. |
| 365 AD | Alexandria, Southern and Eastern Mediterranean | 365 Crete earthquake | Earthquake | On the morning of 21 July 365 AD, an earthquake triggered a tsunami more than 30 metres (100 ft) high, devastating Alexandria and the eastern and southern shores of the Mediterranean, killing thousands, and throwing ships nearly 2 miles (3 km) inland. This tsunami also devastated many large cities in what is now Libya and Tunisia. The anniversary of the disaster was still commemorated annually in the late sixth century in Alexandria as a "day of horror." Researchers at the University of Cambridge recently carbon dated corals off the coast of Crete that were raised 10 metres (30 ft) and out of the water during the earthquake, indicating that the tsunami was generated by an earthquake on a pronounced fault in the Hellenic Trench. Scientists estimate that such an uplift is likely to only occur once every 5,000 years; however, the other segments of the fault could slip on a similar scale every 800 years or so. |
| 551 AD | Lebanese coast | 551 Beirut earthquake | Earthquake | The earthquake of 9 July 551 AD was one of the largest seismic events in and around Lebanon during the Byzantine period. The earthquake was associated with a tsunami along the Lebanese coast and a local landslide near Al-Batron. A large fire in Beirut also continued for almost two months. |
| 563 AD | Lake Geneva, Switzerland and France | Tauredunum event | Underwater mudslide | Probably generated by a landslide that triggered a collapse of sediments at the mouth of the River Rhône, the tsunami traveled the length of Lake Geneva, reaching a height of 16 metres (52 ft) in some places. The wave probably killed hundreds, or even thousands, of people. |
| 684 AD | Nankai, Japan | 684 Hakuhō earthquake, Nankai earthquake | Earthquake | The first recorded tsunami in Japan struck on 29 November 684 AD off the coast of the Kii, Shikoku, and Awaji region. The earthquake, estimated at a magnitude of 8.4, was followed by a large tsunami, but there are no estimates of the number of deaths. From then on, the Japanese would keep meticulous records of tsunamis. |
| 701 AD | Tanba, Japan | | Earthquake | On 12 May 701 AD, an earthquake and a tsunami measuring up to 40 metres (100 ft) hit the coast of Tanba Province (Kyoto Prefecture). |
| 869 AD | Sanriku, Japan | 869 Jōgan earthquake | Earthquake | The Sanriku region was hit by a large tsunami on 13 July 869 AD, causing floods to spread 4 km (2.5 mi) inland from the coast. Tagajō was destroyed, with an estimated 1,000 casualties. |
| 887 AD | Nankai, Japan | 887 Ninna Nankai earthquake | Earthquake | On 26 August 887 AD, there was a strong commotion in the Kyoto region, causing great destruction. A tsunami inundated the coastal region and some people died. The coast of Settsu Province (Osaka Prefecture) suffered especially, and the tsunami was also observed on the coast of the Sea of Hyūga (Miyazaki Prefecture). |

== 1000–1700 AD ==
| Year | Location | Main Article | Primary Cause | Description |
|---|---|---|---|---|
| 1026 | Iwami, Japan | 1026 Manju tsunami | Earthquake or landslide | On 16 June 1026, a 10 m (30 ft) tsunami struck the Sea of Japan coast of then Iwami Province, killing more than 1,000 people. |
| 1033 | Jordan Valley, Levant | 1033 Jordan Valley earthquake | Earthquake | On 5 December 1033, a large earthquake struck along the Dead Sea Transform, causing extreme devastation. At least 70,000 killed. Several killed by a moderate tsunami. |
| 1169 | Sicily, Italy | 1169 Sicily earthquake | Earthquake | On 4 February 1169, a tsunami affected most of the Ionian coast of Sicily. |
| 1202 | Eastern Mediterranean | 1202 Syria earthquake | Earthquake | On 20 May 1202, a tsunami probably associated with this event was observed in eastern Cyprus and along the Syrian and Lebanese coasts. |
| 1293 | Kamakura, Japan | 1293 Kamakura earthquake | Earthquake | On 27 May 1293, a magnitude 7.1 earthquake and tsunami hit Kamakura, then the de facto capital of Japan, killing 23,000 in the resulting fires. |
| 1303 | Eastern Mediterranean | 1303 Crete earthquake | Earthquake | A team from Southern Cross University in Lismore, New South Wales, Australia, has found evidence of five tsunamis hitting Greece in the last 2000 years. "Most were small and local, but on August 8, 1303 a larger one hit Crete, Rhodes, Alexandria and Acre in Israel." |
| 1343 | Gulf of Naples, Italy | 1343 Naples tsunami | Landslide (possibly volcanic) | A 2019 study attributes the event to a massive submarine landslide caused by the collapse of the flank of the Stromboli volcano on 25 November 1343. |
| 1361 | Nankai, Japan | 1361 Shōhei earthquake | Earthquake | On 3 August 1361, during the Shōhei era, an 8.4 earthquake struck Nankaidō, followed by a tsunami. A total of 660 deaths were reported. The earthquake struck Awa, Settsu, Kii, Yamato and Awaji Provinces provinces (Tokushima, Osaka, Wakayama and Nara Prefectures and Awaji Island). A tsunami hit Awa and Tosa Provinces (Tokushima and Kōchi Prefectures), in Kii Strait and in Osaka Bay. The hot spring of Yunomine, Kii (Tanabe, Wakayama) stopped. The port of Yuki, Awa (Minami, Tokushima) was destroyed and more than 1,700 houses were razed. |
| 1420 | Caldera, Chile | 1420 Caldera earthquake | Earthquake | On 31 August 1420, a huge earthquake shook what is now the Atacama Region of Chile. Landslides occurred along the coast and tsunamis affected not only Chile but also Hawaii and Japan. |
| 1454 | Mutsu Province, Japan | 1454 Kyōtoku earthquake and tsunami | Earthquake | On 23 November 1454, during the Kyōtoku era, an earthquake, possibly 8.4 or higher, shook the Kantō and Tōhoku regions at midnight, generating a tsunami that inundated 1–2.5 km (0.6–1.6 mi) of land, sweeping people away in Mutsu Province. |
| 1498 | Nankai, Japan | 1498 Meiō earthquake | Earthquake | On 20 September 1498, during the Meiō era, a 7.5 earthquake occurred. The ports of Kii Province (Wakayama Prefecture) were damaged by a tsunami of several metres in height. Between 30,000 and 40,000 deaths were estimated. The building around the great Buddha of Kamakura (at an altitude of 7 m or 23 ft) was swept away by the tsunami. |
| 1531 | Lisbon, Portugal | 1531 Lisbon earthquake | Earthquake | The earthquake of 26 January 1531 was accompanied by a tsunami in the Tagus River that destroyed ships in the port of Lisbon. |
| 1541 | Nueva Cadiz, Venezuela | | Earthquake | In 1528, Cristóbal Guerra founded Nueva Cádiz on the island of Cubagua, the first Spanish settlement in Venezuela. Nueva Cádiz, with a population of 1,000 to 1,500, may have been destroyed by an earthquake followed by tsunami on 25 December 1541; it could also have been a major hurricane. The ruins were declared a National Monument of Venezuela in 1979. |
| 1585 | Aleutian Islands, Alaska | 1585 Aleutian Islands earthquake | Earthquake | On 11 June 1585, a moderate tsunami struck the Japanese coast of Sanriku. At the same time, several native Hawaiians died after their settlements were hit by a tsunami-like event described in oral traditions. Evidence of a paleotsunami was also found in the Hawaiian Islands corresponding to a large tsunami in the 16th century. Modelling of a magnitude 9.25 earthquake in the Aleutian Islands matched descriptions and geological evidence in Japan and Hawaii. |
| 1586 | Honshu, Japan | 1586 Tenshō earthquake | Earthquake | A magnitude 7.9 earthquake struck central Honshu on 18 January 1586. The earthquake triggered tsunami waves in Lake Biwa, Wakasa Bay and Ise Bay, destroying villages and drowning residents. Waves of up to 5 metres (16 ft) were estimated. The events killed 8,000 people. |
| 1605 | Nankai, Japan | 1605 Keichō earthquake | Earthquake | On 3 February 1605, in the Keichō era, an 8.1 magnitude earthquake and tsunami struck Japan. A tsunami with a known maximum height of 30 m (98 ft) was observed from the Bōsō Peninsula to the eastern part of Kyushu Island. The eastern part of the Bōsō Peninsula, Edo Bay (Tokyo Bay), Sagami and Tōtōmi Provinces (Kanagawa and Shizuoka Prefectures), and the southeastern coast of Tosa Province (Kōchi Prefecture) suffered particularly severely. 700 houses (41%) in Hiro, Kii (Hirogawa, Wakayama) were razed and 3,600 people drowned in Shishikui, Awa (Kaiyō, Tokushima) area. Wave heights reached 5 to 6 metres (16 to 20 ft) in Kannoura, Tosa (Tōyō, Kōchi) and 8 to 10 metres (26 to 33 ft) in Sakihama, Tosa (Muroto, Kōchi). 350 drowned in Kannoura and 60 at Sakihama. In total more than 5,000 drowned. |
| 1608 | Sendai Plains, Japan | | | On 23 November 1608, a major earthquake hit Sendai beach, generating a tsunami that swept away and killed over 50 people. |
| 1611 | Sanriku, Japan | 1611 Sanriku earthquake | Earthquake | An 8.1M_{s} earthquake in the Pacific Ocean off the Sanriku Coast on 2 December 1611 generated a tsunami that reached its maximum estimated height of about 20 metres (70 ft) at Ōfunato, Japan. About 5,000 people were killed. |
| 1674 | Banda Sea, Indonesia | 1674 Ambon earthquake and megatsunami | Earthquake | On 17 February 1674, an earthquake triggered a landslide that generated waves of up to 100 metres (330 ft) along the coast of Ambon Island, killing more than 2,000. |
| 1677 | Bōsō Peninsula, Japan | 1677 Bōsō earthquake | Earthquake | On 4 November 1677, a low-intensity earthquake was felt in the area around the Bōsō Peninsula, but was followed by a large tsunami, which killed an estimated 569 people. |
| 1693 | Sicily | 1693 Sicily earthquake | Earthquake | A major earthquake on 9 January 1693 was followed on 11 January 1693 by the most powerful earthquake in Italian history. The ensuing tsunami devastated the Ionian Sea coast and the Strait of Messina. The wave struck about 230 kilometres (140 mi) of the coast of Sicily, reaching a height of between 2.4 and 26 metres (8 and 85 ft) at Augusta and penetrating 1.5 kilometres (0.9 mi) inland at Mascali. It is unclear whether the tsunami was caused directly by the earthquake or by a large underwater landslide triggered by the event. |

== 1700s ==
| Year | Location | Main Article | Primary Cause | Description |
|---|---|---|---|---|
| 1700 | Pacific Northwest, U.S. and Canada | 1700 Cascadia earthquake | Earthquake | On 26 January 1700, the Cascadia earthquake, with an estimated magnitude of 9.0, ruptured the Cascadia subduction zone (C SZ) from Vancouver Island to California, and triggered a massive tsunami recorded in Japan and by the oral traditions of indigenous peoples of the Pacific Northwest. The wave caught the Japanese off guard, not knowing its origin, and was explained in the book, The Orphan Tsunami. |
| 1703 | Kanto, Japan | 1703 Genroku earthquake | Earthquake | On 31 December 1703, an 8.2 magnitude earthquake struck Edo. A tsunami up to 11.7 metres (38 ft) high was recorded along the coast of the Kantō Region. Official reports put the death toll of the earthquake disaster at 5,233 people, but some estimates put it as high as 200,000. |
| 1707 | Nankai, Japan | 1707 Hōei earthquake | Earthquake | On 28 October 1707, during the Hōei era, an 8.4 magnitude earthquake and tsunami up to 10 metres (30 ft) high hit Tosa Province (Kōchi Prefecture). More than 29,000 houses were destroyed, causing around 30,000 deaths. In Tosa, 11,170 houses were razed to the ground, and 18,441 people drowned. Some 700 drowned and 603 houses were razed to the ground in Osaka. The hot springs of Yunomine, Kii (Tanabe, Wakayama), Sanji, Ryujin, Kii (Tanabe, Wakayama) Kanayana (Shirahama, Wakayama) and Dōgo, Iyo (Matsuyama, Ehime) stopped flowing. |
| 1731 | Storfjorden, Norway | Storfjorden | Landslide | On 8 January 1731, a landslide in the Storfjorden off Stranda caused a tsunami up to 100 metres (330 ft) high, killing 17 people. |
| 1737 | Kamchatka Peninsula, Russia | 1737 Kamchatka earthquake | Earthquake | On 17 October 1737, a 9.0-9.3 M_{W} earthquake in the Pacific Ocean off the southeastern coast of the Kamchatka Peninsula generated a tsunami. The tsunami reached a height of 30 metres (100 ft) in Avacha Bay, and elsewhere on the peninsula's coast waves of 6.3 metres (21 ft) and 63 metres (207 ft) were reported and evidence of a run-up height of 70 metres (200 ft) was found on one ridge. In the northern Kuril Islands, the wave was 20 metres (70 ft) tall, while on Amchitka in the Aleutian Islands it reached 12 to 16 metres (39 to 52 ft). |
| 1741 | Western Oshima, Japan | 1741 eruption of Oshima–Ōshima and the Kampo tsunami | Volcano | On 29 August 1741, the western side of the Oshima Peninsula, Ezo (Hokkaido) was hit by a tsunami caused by an eruption of the volcano on the island of Ōshima. The tsunami itself is believed to have been the result from a landslide of a partly underwater landslide triggered by the eruption. 1,467 people died in Ezo. |
| 1743 | Apulia, Italy | 1743 Salento earthquake | Earthquake | On 20 February 1743, a magnitude 7.1 earthquake in the Strait of Otranto triggered a tsunami up to 11 metres (36 ft) high. Between 180 and 300 people died. |
| 1755 | Lisbon, Portugal | 1755 Lisbon earthquake | Earthquake | Tens of thousands of Portuguese people who survived the Great Lisbon earthquake on 1 November 1755 were killed by a tsunami 40 minutes later. Many fled to the coast, an area safe from fires and debris during aftershocks. These people watched the sea recede, revealing a seabed littered with lost cargo and shipwrecks. The tsunami then struck with a maximum height of 15 metres (49 ft), traveling inland. The earthquake, tsunami, and fires killed 40,000 to 50,000 people. Historical records of early navigators such as Vasco da Gama were lost, and among the destroyed buildings were most of Portugal's examples of Manueline architecture. Eighteenth-century Europeans struggled to understand the disaster within religious and rational belief systems, and Enlightenment philosophers, notably Voltaire, wrote about the event. The philosophical concept of the sublime, as described by Immanuel Kant was inspired by attempts to understand the enormity of the Lisbon earthquake and tsunami. The tsunami took just over 4 hours to travel over 1,000 miles (1,610 km) to Cornwall in the United Kingdom. An account by Arnold Boscowitz claimed "great loss of life." It also struck Galway, Ireland, and caused heavy damage to the Spanish Arch section of the city wall. |
| 1756 | Langfjorden, Norway | Langfjorden | Landslide | On 22 February 1756, a landslide in Langfjorden generated three megatsunamis in Langfjorden and Eresfjorden with heights of 40 to 50 metres (130 to 160 ft). The waves killed 32 people and destroyed 168 buildings, 196 boats, large amounts of forest, roads and boat landings. |
| 1761 | Lisbon, Portugal | 1761 Lisbon earthquake | Earthquake | More than five years after the 1755 earthquake, on 31 March 1761, another event with an estimated magnitude of 8.5 shook the Iberian Peninsula. It generated a tsunami up to 2.4 metres (7.9 ft) at Lisbon. In Cornwall, the tsunami reached more than 1 metre (3 ft) in height. The details of this earthquake are largely unknown, censored by the Portuguese government to prevent panic. |
| 1762 | Rahkine, Burma | 1762 Arakan earthquake | Earthquake | On 2 April 1762, the west coast of Myanmar (Burma) and Chittagong was hit by an earthquake with an estimated magnitude of 8.8, triggering a tsunami in the Bay of Bengal and killing more than 200 people. |
| 1771 | Yaeyama Islands, Ryūkyū | 1771 Great Yaeyama Tsunami | Earthquake | An underwater earthquake with an estimated magnitude of 7.4 occurred near the Yaeyama Islands in the former Ryūkyū Kingdom (present day Okinawa, Japan) on 24 April 1771 at about 08:00. The earthquake is not believed to have directly caused any deaths, but the resulting tsunami killed an estimated 12,000 people. Advance estimates at Ishigaki Island range from 30 to 85.4 metres (100 to 280 ft). The tsunami was followed by malaria epidemics and crop failures. It took 148 years for the population to return to pre-tsunami levels. |
| 1781 | Pingtung, Taiwan | | | In April or May 1781, according to Taiwan County records, in Jiadong, Pingtung, a 3-metre (10 ft) wave hit the city. Fish and shrimp rampaged wildly on the shore and nearby fishing villages were wiped out. However, no earthquake was reported. A different source claims that a 30-metre (100 ft) wave also hit Tainan. One possibility is a misrecording of the date, corresponding to the Great Yaeyama event mentioned above. |
| 1783 | Calabria, Italy | 1783 Calabrian earthquakes | Earthquake | The earthquake was the second of a sequence of five shocks that shook Calabria between 5 February and 28 March 1783. The citizens of Scilla spent the night after the first earthquake on the beach, where they were washed away by the tsunami, causing 1,500 deaths. The tsunami was caused by the collapse of Monte Paci into the sea, near the city. Estimated deaths from earthquake and tsunami are 32,000 to 50,000. |
| 1792 | Kyūshū, Japan | 1792 Unzen earthquake and tsunami | Volcanic processes | Tsunamis were the main cause of death in the worst volcanic disaster in Japanese history, an eruption of Mount Unzen, Hizen Province (Nagasaki Prefecture), Kyushu, Japan. Towards the end of 1791, a series of earthquakes on the western flank of Mount Unzen moved towards Fugen-dake, one of the peaks of Mount Unzen. In February 1792, Fugen-dake erupted, starting two months of lava flows. The earthquakes continued, approaching the city of Shimabara. On the night of 21 May 1792, two major earthquakes preceded the collapse of the eastern flank of Mount Unzen's Mayuyama dome. An avalanche swept across Shimabara and Ariake Bay, causing a tsunami. The tsunami hit Higo Province (Kumamoto Prefecture) along Ariake Bay before recovering. Of the estimated 15,000 deaths, around 5,000 are believed to have died from the landslide, around 5,000 from the tsunami in Higo Province, and around 5,000 from the tsunami that returned to Shimabara. The waves reached a height of 100 m (330 ft), making it a small megatsunami. |
| 1793 | Sanriku, Japan | | Earthquake | On 7 January 1793, a major earthquake struck around 12:00 at the southern coast of Sanriku. It swept away 72 houses and killed 11 people in Otsuchi. |
| 1797 | Sumatra, Indonesia | 1797 Sumatra earthquake | Earthquake | On 10 February 1797, a massive earthquake estimated to be approximately 8.4 on the moment magnitude scale struck Sumatra in Indonesia. Many deaths occurred, although it is not known how many. |

== 1800s ==
| Year | Location | Main Article | Primary Cause | Description |
|---|---|---|---|---|
| 1806 | Goldau, Switzerland | 1806 Goldau landslide | Landslide | On 2 September 1806, a landslide of 120,000,000 tons of rock, much of which displaced water from Lake Lauerz and caused a tsunami that inundated lakeside villages, killing 457 people. |
| 1812 | Santa Barbara Channel, Alta California | 1812 Ventura earthquake | Earthquake or landslide | On 21 December 1812, a magnitude 7.1 to 7.5 earthquake triggered a 3.4-metre (11 ft) tsunami (eyewitness reported more than 15 metres [50 ft]) in the Lompoc area, leveling homes and missions in the area. It left a ship inland before taking it back out to sea. Its origin may be due to faults or landslides. |
| 1815 | Tambora, Indonesia | 1815 eruption of Mount Tambora | Volcanic eruption | On 10 April 1815, an eruption of VEI 7 caused a localized tsunami. Tsunami of 4 metres (13 ft) in Sanggar, 1 to 2 m (3 to 7 ft) in Besuki, Java Island and 2 m in the Molucca Islands. |
| 1819 | Gujarat, India | 1819 Rann of Kutch earthquake | Earthquake | On 16 June 1819, a local tsunami inundated the Great Rann of Kutch |
| 1833 | Sumatra, Dutch East-Indies | 1833 Sumatra earthquake | Earthquake | On 25 November 1833, an earthquake with an estimated moment magnitude between 8.8 and 9.2 struck Sumatra in the Dutch East-Indies. The coast of Sumatra, near the epicenter of the earthquake, was the most affected by the resulting tsunami. |
| 1837 | Valdivia, Chile | 1837 Valdivia earthquake | Earthquake | On 7 November 1837, an earthquake hit south-central Chile, also striking Hawaii, French Polynesia, and Japan. In Japan, it was considered strange as they had felt no earthquake prior to the tsunami. |
| 1841 | Kamchatka Peninsula, Russia | 1841 Kamchatka earthquake | Earthquake | On 17 May 1841, an earthquake with an estimated moment magnitude of at least 9.0 in the Pacific Ocean off the Kamchatka Peninsula generated a tsunami with a maximum run-up height of 15 metres (50 ft) along the peninsula's eastern coast. The tsunami reached Hilo, Hawaii, where it measured 4.6 metres (15 ft). |
| 1843 | Sumatra, Dutch East-Indies | 1843 Nias earthquake | Earthquake | On 5 January 1843, a 7.8 earthquake collapsed many homes in Sumatra and Nias, also generating a tsunami. |
| 1843 | Guadeloupe, Lesser Antilles | 1843 Guadeloupe earthquake | Earthquake | On 8 February 1843, an 8.5 earthquake generated a 1.2-metre (3.9 ft) high tsunami which hit Antigua. |
| 1843 | Honshu, Japan | 1843 Tokachi earthquake | Earthquake | On 25 April 1843, an 8.0 earthquake hit around 6:00, causing waves 4 to 7 metres (13 to 23 ft) high. It damaged houses in Akamae, Miyako, as well as damaging 14 or 15 huts in Shirogane, Hachinohe. |
| 1853–1854 | Lituya Bay, Alaska | | Landslide | Sometime between August 1853 and May 1854, a large tsunami traveled through the bay. The wave had a maximum height of 120 metres (390 ft) and inundated the bay shoreline up to 230 metres (750 ft) inland. |
| 1854 | Nankai, Tōkai, and Kyushu, Japan | Ansei great earthquakes | Earthquake | The Ansei earthquakes which hit the south coast of Japan, were actually a series of three earthquakes over the course of several days.: An 8.4 magnitude earthquake on 23 December 1854, near Mikawa Province (Aichi Prefecture) and Tōtōmi Province (Shizuoka Prefecture) produced tsunami heights of 4 to 6 metres (13 to 20 ft), with localized heights of up to 16.5 metres (54 ft), which is believed to be due to the shape of the port.; Another magnitude 8.4 earthquake on 24 December 1854 in Kii Province (Wakayama Prefecture). The resulting tsunami reached a height of 8.4 metres (28 ft), and swept away 15,000 homes away. The number of homes directly destroyed by the earthquake was 2,598; 1,443 people died.; A magnitude 7.4 earthquake on 26 December 1854 in Iyo Province (Ehime Prefecture) and Bungo Province (Ōita Prefecture).; The total result was 80,000 to 100,000 deaths. |
| 1855 | Edo, Japan | 1855 Edo earthquake | Earthquake | The following year, on 11 November 1855, the Great Ansei Edo earthquake of 1855 struck the Edo (Tokyo) region of Japan, killing between 4,500 and 10,000 people. Popular stories of the time blamed the earthquakes and tsunamis on a wallowing giant catfish named Namazu thrashing about. The name of the Japanese era was changed to bring good luck after four disastrous earthquakes and tsunamis in two years. |
| 1856 | Sanriku, Japan | | Earthquake | On 23 July 1856, at around 12:00, an earthquake generated a tsunami affecting communities similar to the 1896 Sanriku earthquake. 108 houses were damaged in the vicinity of what is now Miyako City. |
| 1856 | Jijel, Algeria | 1856 Djijelli earthquakes | Earthquake | On August 22, 1856, an earthquake generated a tsunami that affected the Mediterranean Sea. |
| 1867 | Virgin Islands | 1867 Virgin Islands earthquake and tsunami | Earthquake | On 18 November 1867, a large doublet earthquake occurred in the Virgin Islands archipelago. The crash likely occurred between the islands of Saint Thomas and Saint Croix. The highest run of 7.6 m (25 ft) was observed at Frederiksted on Saint Croix, and occurred within minutes of the tremors. |
| 1867 | Keelung, Taiwan | 1867 Keelung earthquake | Earthquake | On 18 December 1867, a major earthquake struck Keelung, Taiwan, causing the crust of the mountains to deform and fissures to open. The water drained out of Keelung Harbor to reveal the sea floor, then returned in a large wave. The boats were dragged to the center of the city. In many places, the ground and the mountains split open and water gushed out of fissures. Hundreds of deaths resulted. |
| 1868 | Hawaiian Islands | 1868 Hawaii earthquake | Earthquake | On 2 April 1868, a local earthquake estimated to be between 7.5 and 8.0 magnitude struck off the southeastern coast of the island of Hawaii. It triggered a landslide on the slopes of the volcano Mauna Loa, 8 kilometres (5 mi) north of Pahala, killing 31 people. Then a tsunami claimed an additional 46 lives. The villages of Punaluu, Ninole, Kawaa, Honuapo, and Keauhou Landing were heavily damaged, and the village of Apua was destroyed. According to one account, the tsunami "passed over the tops of coconut palms, probably 60 feet [18 m] high .... inland for a distance of a quarter of a mile [0.4 km] in places, carrying into the sea as it returned, houses, men, women, and almost all furniture." |
| 1868 | Arica, Peru (now part of Chile) | 1868 Arica earthquake | Earthquake | On 13 August 1868, an earthquake with an estimated magnitude of 8.5 struck the Peru–Chile Trench. A resulting tsunami hit the port of Arica, then part of Peru, killing an estimated 25,000 in Arica and 70,000 in total. Three military ships anchored in Arica, the American warship USS Wateree and the freighter Fredonia, and the Peruvian warship America, were swept away by the tsunami. |
| 1871 | Molucca Sea | 1871 Ruang eruption and tsunami | Volcanic eruption | In March 1871, an explosive eruption from the Ruang volcano triggered a locally devastating tsunami measuring 25 m (80 ft). It flooded many villages on nearby islands, killing about 400 people. |
| 1874 | Lituya Bay, Alaska | | Landslide | Sometime around 1874, perhaps in May 1874, a megatsunami occurred in Lituya Bay. It had a maximum rise height of 20 metres (80 ft), flooding the bay shoreline as far as 640 metres (2,100 ft) inland. |
| 1877 | Iquique, Chile | 1877 Iquique earthquake | Earthquake | On 9 May 1877, an earthquake with an estimated magnitude of 8.5 occurred off the coast of what is now Chile, causing a tsunami that killed an estimated 2,541 people. This event followed the destructive earthquake and tsunami at Arica by only nine years. |
| 1881 | Andaman Islands, Nicobar Islands | 1881 Nicobar Islands earthquake | Earthquake | On 31 December 1881 a tsunami caused by an earthquake was recorded on all the coasts of the Bay of Bengal by tide gauges. This information has been used to estimate the rupture area and magnitude of the earthquake. |
| 1883 | Krakatoa, Sunda Strait, Netherlands East Indies | 1883 eruption of Krakatoa | Volcanic eruption | The volcano on the island of Krakatoa in the Dutch East-Indies (present-day Indonesia) exploded on 27 August 1883, partially emptying its subterranean magma chamber, causing much of the land and seabed to collapse onto it. The collapse generated a series of large tsunami waves, some more than 40 metres (130 ft) above sea level. Tsunami waves were observed throughout the Indian Ocean, the Pacific Ocean, and as far away as the west coast of the United States and South America. On the opposing coasts of Java and Sumatra flooding from the sea reached many miles inland and caused such loss of life that one area was never resettled, reverting to jungle and is now the Ujung Kulon Nature Reserve. |
| 1888 | Ritter Island, Netherlands East Indies | 1888 Ritter Island eruption and tsunami | Volcanic eruption | On 13 March 1888, a significant portion of Ritter Island collapsed into the sea, generating tsunamis up to 12 to 15 metres (39 to 49 ft) high that struck nearby islands and traveled as far south as New Guinea, where they were 8 metres (26 ft) high. The waves killed about 3,000 people. |
| 1896 | Sanriku, Japan | 1896 Sanriku earthquake | Earthquake | On 15 June 1896, at around 19:32 local time, a large undersea earthquake off the coast of Sanriku, northeastern Honshu, Japan, triggered tsunami waves that hit the shore approximately half an hour later. Although the earthquake itself is not believed to have caused any deaths, the waves, which reached a height of 30 metres (100 ft), killed an estimated 27,000 people. In 2005, the same general area was hit by the 2005 Sanriku Japan earthquake, but without a major tsunami. |

== 1900–1950 ==
| Year | Location | Main Article | Primary Cause | Description |
|---|---|---|---|---|
| 1905 | Loenvatnet, Norway | | Rockfall | On 15 January 1905, a rockslide hit lake Loenvatnet in Sogn og Fjordane, creating a 40 m (130 ft) flood wave that destroyed the villages of Ytre Nesdal and Bødal, killing 61 people. The slide, which started 500 metres (1,640 ft) up the side of Mount Ramnefjell, had a mass of about 870,000 metric tons (860,000 long tons; 960,000 short tons) when it entered the lake. |
| 1905 | Disenchantment Bay, Alaska | | Glacier collapse | On 4 July 1905, a tsunami at Disenchantment Bay in Alaska snapped tree branches 34 metres (110 ft) above ground level 0.8 kilometres (0.5 mi) away from its source, killed vegetation to a height of 20 metres (65 ft) as far as 5 kilometres (3 mi) away, and reached heights of 15 to 35 metres (50 to 115 ft) at various locations on the Haenke Island shoreline. At a distance of 24 kilometres (15 mi), observers at Russell Fjord reported a series of large waves that caused the water level to rise and fall 5 to 6 metres (15 to 20 ft) for a half an hour. |
| 1906 | Tumaco-Esmeraldas, Colombia-Ecuador | 1906 Ecuador–Colombia earthquake | Earthquake | On 31 January 1906 an earthquake caused a tsunami that killed 500 people in Tumaco and Esmeraldas and hit Colombia, Ecuador, California, Hawaii, and Japan. The waves were 5 metres (20 ft) high. |
| 1907 | Simeulue, Nias off Sumatra | 1907 Sumatra earthquake | Earthquake | On 4 January 1907, an earthquake triggered a transoceanic tsunami, causing 2,188 deaths in Simeulue and Nias. |
| 1908 | Messina, Italy | 1908 Messina earthquake | Earthquake-triggered underwater landslide | The aftermath of the tsunami that struck Messina in 1908 On 28 December 1908 an earthquake combined with a tsunami claimed an estimated 80,000 lives. |
| 1917 | Halifax Harbour, Nova Scotia, Canada | Halifax Explosion | Explosion | After the cargo ship SS Mont-Blanc caught fire on 6 December 1917, her cargo of high explosives detonated in a massive explosion that displaced water around the ship and briefly exposed the bottom of Halifax Harbour. Water rushing in to fill the void generated a tsunami which reached a height of 18 metres (59 ft) along the harbour's western shore at Halifax. |
| 1918 | Puerto Rico | 1918 San Fermín earthquake | Earthquake-triggered underwater landslide | On 11 October 1918 an underwater earthquake in the Mona Passage which may have been associated with an underwater landslide generated a tsunami with a run-up height of 6 metres (20 ft) along the northern and western coasts of Puerto Rico, killing 116 people and leaving 100 missing. |
| 1923 | Nha Trang, French Indochina | | Volcano | Generated by either a 6.1-magnitude earthquake in the Hon Tro Islands or a volcanic eruption, the tsunami flooded the coast, reportedly damaging a stable 5 to 6 metres (16 to 20 ft) from the shoreline. |
| 1923 | Kamchatka Peninsula, Soviet Union | February 1923 Kamchatka earthquake | Underwater earthquake | An 8.4-magnitude earthquake in the Pacific Ocean east of the Kamchatka Peninsula on 4 February 1923 generated a tsunami which reached a height of 8 metres (26 ft) along the peninsula's coast. The wave caused property damage there and in Hawaii, and also was observed in Japan and California. |
| 1923 | Kantō, Japan | 1923 Great Kantō earthquake | Earthquake | The Great Kantō earthquake, which occurred in eastern Japan on 1 September 1923, and devastated Tokyo, Yokohama, and surrounding areas, triggered tsunamis that struck the Shōnan coast, the Bōsō Peninsula, the Izu Islands and the east coast of the Izu Peninsula, in a matter of minutes in some cases. In Atami, waves that reached 12 metres (39 ft) were recorded. Examples of tsunami damage include about 100 people killed along Kamakura's Yuigahama beach and about 50 people on the Enoshima causeway. However, tsunamis only accounted for a small proportion of the final death toll of more than 100,000, most of whom died in fires. |
| 1927 | Southern California, United States | 1927 Lompoc earthquake | Earthquake | On 4 November 1927 a 7.3 earthquake struck Southern California causing a 2-metre (7 ft) tsunami that caused some damage. |
| 1929 | Venezuela | 1929 Cumaná earthquake | Earthquake | On 17 January 1929 a 6.9 earthquake hit the city of Cumaná in Venezuela causing major damage and a 3-metre (10 ft) tsunami that swept away homes and killed 40 people. |
| 1929 | Grand Haven, Michigan, United States | | Meteorology | On 4 July 1929, a meteotsunami struck Grand Haven, Michigan, on the eastern shore of Lake Michigan, following an early-morning storm. A wave measuring approximately 6 meters (20 ft) surged over the Grand Haven pier, sweeping people into the lake, while strong rip currents carried others away from the shore. Ten people died in the incident."New buoy is detecting meteotsunamis in the Great Lakes". NOAA Great Lakes Environmental Research Laboratory. |
| 1929 | Newfoundland | 1929 Grand Banks earthquake | Earthquake | On 18 November 1929, a magnitude 7.2 earthquake occurred below the Laurentian Slope on the Grand Banks. The earthquake was felt throughout Canada's Atlantic provinces and as far away as Ottawa and Claymont, Delaware. The resulting tsunami measured more than 7 metres (23 ft) high and took about 2 1/2 hours to reach the Burin Peninsula on the south coast of Newfoundland, where 28 people in various communities were killed. It also broke telegraph cables laid under the Atlantic Ocean. |
| 1930 | Gulf of Martaban, Burma (Myanmar) | 1930 Bago earthquake | Earthquake | On 5 May 1930, a 7.5 magnitude earthquake along the Sagaing Fault triggered a 1.06-metre (3.5 ft) high tsunami that inundated the southern coast of Myanmar. It traveled up rivers, destroying harbors and anchored ships. The earthquake killed more than 500 people in Bago, Rangoon, and many other cities. |
| 1932 | Mexico | 1932 Jalisco earthquakes | Earthquake | Three very large to large earthquakes off the coast of Jalisco in June 1932 each generated tsunamis. The last and smallest event in the series occurred upslope relative to the mainshock and generated the largest tsunami. |
| 1933 | Sanriku, Japan | 1933 Sanriku earthquake | Earthquake | On 3 March 1933, the coast of Sanriku in northeastern Honshu, Japan, which suffered a devastating tsunami in 1896 (see above), was struck again by tsunami waves resulting from a magnitude 8.1 offshore earthquake. The earthquake destroyed around 5,000 homes and killed 3,068 people, the vast majority as a result of the tsunami waves. The coastal town of Tarō (now part of Miyako city) in Iwate Prefecture was particularly hard hit, losing 42% of its total population and 98% of its buildings. Tarō is now protected by a tsunami wall, currently 10 metres (30 ft) high and over 2 kilometres (1.2 mi) long. |
| 1934 | Tafjorden, Norway | Tafjorden | Rockslide | On 7 April 1934, a rockslide of about 2,000,000 cubic metres (2,600,000 yd^{3}) of rock fell from Langhamaren Mountain from a height of about 700 metres (2,300 ft). The rock landed in Tafjorden creating a local tsunami that killed 40 people living on the fjord's shore. Waves reached a height of 62 metres (200 ft) near the landslide, about 7 metres (23 ft) at Sylte, and about 16 metres (52 ft) at Tafjord. It was one of the worst natural disasters in Norway in the 20th century. |
| 1936 | Loenvatnet, Norway | | Rockfall | On 13 September 1936, approximately 1,000,000 m^{3} (1,300,000 cu yd) of mountain broke off the Mount Ramnefjell at a height of 800 metres (2,620 ft) and fell into lake Loenvatnet in Sogn og Fjordane, creating a 70 m (230 ft) flood wave that destroyed several farms, killing 74 people. The second such incident in 31 years, the disaster caused the permanent depopulation of the area. |
| 1936 | Lituya Bay, Alaska | | Unknown | On 27 October 1936, a megatsunami occurred in Alaska's Lituya Bay with a maximum breakthrough height of 490 feet (149 m) in Crillon Inlet at the head of the bay. All four eyewitnesses to the wave in Lituya Bay survived and described it as being between 100 and 250 feet (30 and 76 m) high as it traveled across the bay. The maximum flood distance was 2,000 feet (610 m) inland along the north shore of the bay. The cause of the megatsunami remains unclear, but it may have been an underwater landslide. |
| 1944 | Columbia Reservoir, Washington, United States | | Landslide | A 4,000,000-to-5,000,000-cubic-yard (3,100,000 to 3,800,000 m^{3}) landslide along the shore of what later was renamed Franklin D. Roosevelt Lake about 98 miles (158 km) above Grand Coulee Dam on 8 April 1944 generated a tsunami which reached a maximum height of 30 feet (9.1 m) along the opposite shore 5,000 feet (1,524 m) away. |
| 1944 | Tōnankai, Japan | 1944 Tōnankai earthquake | Earthquake | An 8.0 magnitude earthquake on 7 December 1944, about 20 kilometres (12.4 mi) off Japan's Shima Peninsula, striking the Pacific coast of central Japan, primarily Mie, Aichi, and Shizuoka Prefectures. Authorities downplayed news of the event to protect wartime morale during World War II, and as a result the full extent of the damage is unknown, but the earthquake is estimated to have killed 1,223 people, with the tsunami being the main cause of deaths. |
| 1945 | Arabian Sea, Indian Ocean | 1945 Balochistan earthquake | Earthquake | The earthquake with a moment magnitude of 8.1 and a maximum perceived intensity of X (Extreme) on the Mercalli intensity scale, occurred in British India at 01:26 on 28 November 1945. It was the result of a fault near the Makran Trench. The resulting tsunami caused damage along the Makran coastal region affecting Pakistan, Iran, Oman and India. |
| 1946 | Aleutian Islands | 1946 Aleutian Islands earthquake | Earthquake | Residents running from an approaching tsunami in Hilo, Hawaii On 1 April 1946, the Aleutian Islands tsunami killed 159 people in Hawaii and five in Alaska (the lighthouse keepers of the Scotch Cap Light in the Aleutian Islands). The wave reached Kauai, Hawaii, 4 1/2 hours after the quake, and Hilo, Hawaii, almost 5 hours later. Residents of these islands were completely caught off guard by the onset of the tsunami due to the inability to broadcast any warnings from the destroyed poles at the Scotch Cap Light on Unimak Island in Alaska. The tsunami is known as the Hawaii April Fools' Day Tsunami because it happened on 1 April and many people thought it was an April Fool's Day prank. The result was the creation of a tsunami warning system known as the Pacific Tsunami Warning Center (PTWC), established in 1949 for the countries of Oceania. |
| 1946 | Nankai, Japan | 1946 Nankai earthquake | Earthquake | The Nankai earthquake of 21 December 1946 had a magnitude of 8.4 and occurred at 04:19 (local time) to the southwestern Japan in the Nankai Trough. This event was one of the Nankai megathrust earthquakes, periodic earthquakes observed off the southern coast of the Kii Peninsula and Shikoku, Japan, every 100 to 150 years. The subsequent tsunami leveled 1451 houses and caused 1500 deaths in Japan, and was observed on tide gauges in California, Hawaii, and Peru. The coastal cities of Kushimoto and Kainan on the Kii Peninsula were particularly hard hit. The earthquake caused more than 1400 deaths, with the tsunami being the main cause. |
| 1947 | Gisborne, New Zealand | 1947 Gisborne earthquakes and tsunami | Earthquake | On 26 March 1947 a M_{w} 7.0-7.1 earthquake struck west of Gisborne, New Zealand, which caused a maximum run-up height of 10 metres (33 ft). Almost two months later, a M_{w} 6.9-7.1 earthquake occurred, which caused a maximum run-up height of 6 metres (20 ft). |
| 1949 | Franklin D. Roosevelt Lake, Washington, United States | | Landslide | A 2,000,000-to-3,000,000-cubic-yard (1,500,000 to 2,300,000 m^{3}) landslide near the mouth of Hawk Creek, about 35 miles (56 km) north of Grand Coulee Dam, entered the lake on 27 July 1949 and generated a 65-foot (20 m) tsunami that struck the town of Lincoln. The wave was noted by observers as far as 20 miles (32 km) away. |

== 1950–2000 ==
| Year | Location | Main Article | Primary Cause | Description |
|---|---|---|---|---|
| 1952 | Hokkaido, Japan | 1952 Tokachi earthquake | Earthquake | On 4 March 1952 a magnitude 8.1 earthquake off the southeast coast of Hokkaido generated a tsunami that reached it greatest height of 6.5 metres (21 ft) in Akkeshi Bay. A 2-metre (6 ft 7 in) wave struck Hachinohe. The earthquake and tsunami combined killed 28 people, injured 287, and left five missing. Property damage included 815 houses completely destroyed, 1,324 half-damaged, and 6,395 partially damaged, with 20 lost to fire and 1,621 rendered uninhabitable. The tsunami swept away 91 houses, flooded 328 others, and damaged 451 ships and boats. In Hamanaka. where it destroyed numerous homes, the tsunami apparently pushed drift ice ashore, exacerbating the damage. |
| 1952 | Franklin D. Roosevelt Lake, Washington, United States | | Landslide | A 15,000,000-cubic-yard (11,000,000 m^{3}) landslide 3 miles (4.8 km) below the Kettle Falls Bridge in April 1952 generated a tsunami which reached a maximum height of 65 feet (20 m) along the opposite shore of the lake. The wave was observed on the lake as far as 6 miles (9.7 km) away. |
| 1952 | Severo-Kurilsk, Kuril Islands, USSR | 1952 Severo-Kurilsk earthquake | Earthquake | On 5 November 1952, a magnitude 9.0 earthquake off the coast of the Kamchatka Peninsula triggered a tsunami. Three waves with heights of 12 to 18 metres (39 to 59 ft) killed 2,336 people at Severo-Kurilsk on the Kuril Islands in the Soviet Union. The tsunami also caused property damage in Hawaii. |
| 1952 | Sullorsuaq Strait, Greenland | | Landslide | On 15 December 1952, a landslide that began at an elevation of 500 to 700 metres (1,640 to 2,297 ft) on a slope of the mountain Niiortuut on the southern coast of western Greenland′s Nuussuaq Peninsula deposited between 1,800,000 and 4,500,000 cubic metres (2,400,000 and 5,900,000 cu yd) of material in Sullorsuaq Strait (known in Danish as Vaigat Strait), generating a tsunami. With a run-up height of 4.5 to 7.7 metres (15 to 25 ft), it struck a group of four fishermen 10 kilometres (6.2 mi) away on the southern coast of the Nuussuaq Peninsula, killing one. Then it struck the town of Qullissat 30 kilometres (19 mi) away across the strait on Disko Island, where it had a run-up height of 2.2 to 2.7 metres (7 ft 3 in to 8 ft 10 in). |
| 1953 | Franklin D. Roosevelt Lake, Washington, United States | | Landslides | A series of landslides about 100 miles (161 km) upstream from Grand Coulee Dam in February 1953 generated a series of tsunamis with a maximum run-up height of 16 feet (4.9 m) along the opposite shore of the lake. Waves crossed the 5,000-foot (1,520 m) wide lake in an average of 90 seconds, indicating an average speed of almost 38 miles per hour (61 km/h). |
| 1953 | Franklin D. Roosevelt Lake, Washington, United States | | Landslides | A series of landslides at Reed Terrace between April and August 1953 generated tsunamis at least 11 times. The largest of them reached a maximum height of 65 feet (20 m) along the opposite shore of the lake and was observed as far as 6 miles (9.7 km) away. One of the waves reached a speed of 45 miles per hour (72 km/h). |
| 1956 | Amorgos, Greece | 1956 Amorgos earthquake | Earthquake | On 9 July 1956, 53 deaths occurred during the largest earthquake of the 20th century in Greece. Santorini was damaged, and a localized tsunami affected the Cyclades and Dodecanese island groups. A maximum run-up of 30 m (98 ft) was observed off the south coast of Amorgos. |
| 1957 | Andreanof Islands, United States | 1957 Andreanof Islands earthquake | Earthquake | On 9 March 1957 an 8.6 earthquake struck the Andreanof Islands, triggering a tsunami. The wave was highest on Unimak Island in the Aleutian Islands, where it was as high as 23 m (75 ft), and where a run-up height of 12 to 15 metres (39 to 49 ft) was observed at Scotch Cap Light, Trappers Cove recorded a wave height of 13.7 m (45 ft), and an 8-metre (26 ft) wave hit Sand Bay. In Hawaii, the wave was 16.1 metres (53 ft) tall at Haena, Kauai, 7 m (23 ft) along the north coast of Oahu, 1.8 m (5 ft 11 in) at Kahului, Maui, and up to 9.8 m (32 ft) along the coast of the island of Hawaii, including 3.9 m (13 ft) at Hilo. The highest wave to strike Chile was 2.0 m (6.7 ft) at Valparaíso. Smaller waves were observed on the coasts of mainland Alaska, California, Mexico, Central America, Peru, American Samoa, the Marshall Islands, Chuuk, and Guam. |
| 1958 | Lituya Bay, Alaska, United States | 1958 Lituya Bay earthquake and megatsunami | Earthquake-triggered landslide | On the night of 9 July 1958, an earthquake on the Fairweather Fault in Alaska loosened about 40 million cubic yards (30 million cubic metres) of rock 3,000 feet (910 m) above the northeast shore of Lituya Bay. The impact in the waters of Gilbert Inlet generated a local tsunami that crashed against the southwest coast and swept the spur separating Gilbert Inlet from the main Lituya Bay. The wave continued through Lituya Bay, over La Chaussee Spit and into the Gulf of Alaska. The force of the wave removed all trees and vegetation from a height of 1,720 feet (520 m) above sea level. This is the highest wave ever recorded. The scale of this wave was much larger than ordinary tsunamis, eventually leading to the new category of megatsunamis. |
| 1958 | Kuril Islands, Soviet Union | 1958 Kuril Islands earthquake | Earthquake-triggered landslide | A magnitude 8.3 to 8.4 earthquake in the Pacific Ocean off Iturup in the Kuril Islands on 6 November 1958 generated a tsunami with a height of up to 5 metres (16 ft) at Shikotan, 2 to 4 metres (7 to 13 ft) at Iturup, and up to 2 metres (6.6 ft) in northern Hokkaido, Japan. The wave also was noted at Wake Island, Midway Atoll, Hawaii, Attu Island in the Aleutian Islands, Alaska, the Marshall Islands, American Samoa, California, and Peru. An aftershock on 12 November produced a 1-metre (3 ft 3 in) tsunami at Iturup, with wave action also noted at Hachinohe, Japan, and on Adak Island in the Aleutians. |
| 1960 | Valdivia, Chile, and Pacific Ocean | 1960 Valdivia earthquake or Great Chilean earthquake | Earthquake | The magnitude 9.5 earthquake of 22 May 1960, the largest earthquake ever recorded, generated one of the most destructive tsunamis of the 20th century. The tsunami spread across the Pacific Ocean, with waves measuring up to 25 metres (82 ft) high in places. The first tsunami wave hit Hilo, Hawaii, approximately 15 hours after its origin. The highest wave at Hilo Bay was measured at around 10.7 m (35 ft). 61 people died, allegedly due to people not heeding the warning sirens. Nearly 22 hours after the earthquake, waves up to 3 metres (10 ft) above high tide hit the coast of Sanriku in Japan, killing 142 people. Up to 6,000 people died in total worldwide from the earthquake and tsunami. |
| 1963 | Vajont Dam, Monte Toc, Italy | Vajont Dam | Landslide | The Vajont Dam as seen from Longarone on 25 September 2012, showing the top 60 to 70 metres (197 to 230 ft). The 200–250-metre (656–820-foot) megatsunami would have obscured virtually all of the sky in this picture. The Vajont Dam was completed in 1961 under Monte Toc, 100 km (62 mi) north of Venice, Italy. At 262 metres (860 ft), it was one of the tallest dams in the world. On 9 October 1963 a landslide of some 260,000,000 cubic metres (340,000,000 cu yd) of forest, dirt, and rock fell into the reservoir at speeds of up to 110 km/h (68 mph). The resulting water displacement caused 50,000,000 cubic metres (65,000,000 cu yd) of water to overflow the dam in a megatsunami wave 250 metres (820 ft) high. The resulting flood destroyed the villages of Longarone, Pirago, Rivalta, Villanova, and Faè, killing 1,450 people. Almost 2,000 people perished in total. |
| 1963 | Urup, Kuril Islands | | Earthquake | A magnitude 8.5 earthquake in the Pacific Ocean off Urup on 13 October 1963 generated a tsunami in the Pacific Ocean and Sea of Okhotsk with run-up heights of as much as 4 to 5 metres (13.1 to 16.4 ft) |
| 1964 | Alaska, U.S. and Pacific Ocean | 1964 Alaska earthquake | Earthquake | After the magnitude 9.2 Good Friday earthquake of 27 March 1964, tsunamis hit Alaska, British Columbia, California, and coastal cities in the Pacific Northwest, killing 121 people. Waves reached 100 feet (30 m) high and killed 11 people as far away as Crescent City, California. |
| 1964 | Niigata, Japan | 1964 Niigata earthquake | Earthquake | On 16 June 1964, 28 people died, and entire apartment buildings were destroyed by soil liquefaction. The subsequent tsunami destroyed the port of Niigata. |
| 1965 | Shemya Island, Alaska | 1965 Rat Islands earthquake | Earthquake | The Rat Islands earthquake of 3 February 1965, generated a 10.7-metre (35 ft) tsunami on Shemya Island. |
| 1968 | Aomori and Hokkaido, Japan | 1968 Tokachi earthquake | Earthquake | On 16 May 1968, an 8.3 earthquake occurred off Aomori and Hokkaido Prefecture. A tsunami as high as 6 m (20 ft) hit the shores. |
| 1969 | Portugal, Morocco | 1969 Portugal earthquake | Earthquake | On 28 February 1969, a large underwater earthquake off the coast of Portugal generated a tsunami that affected both Portugal and Morocco. |
| 1975 | Hawaii, United States | 1975 Hawaii earthquake | Earthquake | On 29 November 1975 a 7.4 earthquake affected Hawaii, triggering a 14-metre (46 ft) tsunami and a small brief eruption of the Kilauea volcano. |
| 1976 | Moro Gulf, Mindanao, Philippines | 1976 Moro Gulf earthquake | Earthquake | On 17 August 1976 at 00:11, a magnitude 7.9 earthquake struck the island of Mindanao, Philippines. The resulting tsunami devastated more than 700 km (430 mi) of the coastline bordering the Gulf of Moro in the North Celebes Sea. Estimated casualties included 5,000 dead, 2,200 missing, 9,500 injured, and 93,500 homeless. Affected cities include Cotabato, Pagadian, and Zamboanga, and the provinces of Basilan, Lanao del Norte, Lanao del Sur, Maguindanao, Sultan Kudarat, Sulu, and Zamboanga del Sur. |
| 1977 | Sumba | 1977 Sumba earthquake | Earthquake | A tsunami was generated with observed run-up heights of up to 5.8 meters (19 ft) and inundation distances of up to 1,200 metres (3,900 ft) at several locations on Sumba and Sumbawa. The maximum tsunami height recorded was 15 meters above high tide.The combined number of victims from both the earthquake and tsunami in Indonesia was at least 107 confirmed dead and several dozen others missing, presumed dead |
| 1978 | Vela Luka, Korčula, Croatia | | Meteorology | On 21 June 1978, a meteotsunami struck Vela Luka on the island of Korčula in the Adriatic Sea, Croatia. The event produced sea-level oscillations with a trough-to-crest height of approximately 6 m (19.5 ft) in Vela Luka Bay, flooding the town and severely damaging the port and boats. No casualties were reported in Vela Luka. The waves were attributed to a travelling atmospheric pressure disturbance that propagated across the Adriatic Sea and generated the waves through Proudman resonance. |
| 1979 | Tumaco, Colombia | 1979 Tumaco earthquake | Earthquake | An 8.1 magnitude earthquake occurred on 12 December 1979 at 02:59 along the Pacific coast of Colombia and Ecuador. The earthquake and resulting tsunami destroyed at least six fishing villages and killed hundreds of people in the Colombian Department of Nariño. The earthquake was felt in Bogotá, Cali, Popayán, Buenaventura, Guayaquil, Esmeraldas, and Quito. The tsunami caused great destruction in the city of Tumaco, as well as in the towns of El Charco, San Juan, Mosquera, and Salahonda on the Pacific coast of Colombia. Casualties included 259 dead, 798 injured and 95 missing or presumed dead. |
| 1979 | Nice, France | 1979 Nice tsunami | Landslide | Two tsunamis struck the coast of France near Nice, accompanied by a landslide at the Nice Airport, and an aseismic submarine landslide. The two waves struck the coast between the Italian border and the town of Antibes 60 miles (97 km) to the west.They reached a height of 3 m (9.8 ft) near Nice and 3.5 m (11 ft) at La Salis (Antibes) and decreased in amplitude from there. |
| 1980 | Spirit Lake, Washington, United States | Spirit Lake (Washington), 1980 eruption of Mount St. Helens, Mount St. Helens | Volcanic eruption | On 18 May 1980, in the course of a major eruption of Mount St. Helens, the upper 460 metres (1,510 ft) of the mountain failed, causing a major landslide. One lobe of the landslide slid into nearby Spirit Lake, creating a megatsunami 260 metres (850 ft) high. |
| 1983 | Sea of Japan | 1983 Sea of Japan earthquake | Earthquake | On 26 May 1983 at 11:59 local time, a magnitude 7.7 earthquake occurred in the Sea of Japan, about 100 km (62 mi) west of the Noshiro coast in Akita Prefecture. Of the 107 fatalities, all but four were killed by the resulting tsunami, which hit communities along the coast, especially Aomori and Akita Prefectures and the Noto Peninsula. Footage of the tsunami hitting the fishing port of Wajima on Noto Peninsula was broadcast on TV. The waves exceeded 10 metres (33 ft) in some areas. Three of the deaths occurred along the east coast of South Korea (whether North Korea was affected is not known). The tsunami also hit Okushiri Island. |
| 1992 | Daytona Beach, Florida, United States | | Meteorology | On 3–4 July 1992, a meteotsunami struck Daytona Beach, Florida, United States. The wave rose approximately 3 meters (10 ft) above the normal tide and caused at least 75 injuries and property damage along the beach. The event was associated with a southward-propagating squall line, which generated the long water wave through atmospheric forcing. |
| 1992 | Nicaragua | 1992 Nicaragua earthquake | Earthquake | On 1 September 1992, a 7.2 earthquake struck off the coast of Nicaragua and sent a devastating tsunami to the coast of the department of Rivas, killing an estimated 116 people. The magnitude of the wave, 9.9 m (32 ft) high, was unusually large given the magnitude of the earthquake. |
| 1992 | Indonesia | 1992 Flores earthquake and tsunami | Earthquake | A magnitude 7.8 earthquake struck Flores, Indonesia, on 12 December 1992. The earthquake produced a devastating 25-metre (82 ft) high tsunami that hit the island and ran inland up to 300 metres (980 ft) shortly after the earthquake. About 2,500 people were killed or missing, including 1,490 at Maumere and 700 in Babi. More than 500 people were injured and 90,000 left homeless. Damage was assessed at more than 100 million US dollars. |
| 1993 | Okushiri, Hokkaido, Japan | 1993 Hokkaido earthquake | Earthquake | A devastating tsunami wave hit Hokkaido in Japan as a result of a magnitude 7.8 offshore 80 miles (130 km) on 12 July 1993. Within minutes, the Japan Meteorological Agency issued a tsunami warning that was broadcast on NHK in English and Japanese (archived at NHK library). However, on Okushiri, a small island near the epicenter, some waves reaching 30 metres (98 ft) hit two to five minutes after the earthquake. Despite being surrounded by tsunami barriers, Aonae, a town on a low-lying peninsula, was hit over the next hour by 13 waves over two metres (6 ft 7 in) high that came from multiple directions, including waves that bounced off Hokkaido. Of the 250 people killed as a result of the earthquake, 197 were victims of the tsunami that hit Okushiri; the waves also caused deaths in Hokkaido. While many residents, recalling the May 1983 tsunami (see above), survived by evacuating on foot, many others underestimated how soon the waves would arrive (the 1983 tsunami took 17 minutes to hit Okushiri) and died trying to evacuate by car. The highest tsunami wave was 31 metres (102 ft) high. |
| 1994 | Java | 1994 Java earthquake | Earthquake | 250 dead as a magnitude 7.8 earthquake and tsunami hit east Java and Bali on 3 June 1994. |
| 1994 | Shikotan, Kuril Islands | | Earthquake | A magnitude 8.3 earthquake in the Pacific Ocean off Shikotan on 4 October 1994 generated a tsunami with a run-up height of as much as 10 metres (33 ft) on Shikotan. |
| 1998 | Papua New Guinea | 1998 Papua New Guinea earthquake | Earthquake | On 17 July 1998, a tsunami in Papua New Guinea killed an estimated 2,200 people. An earthquake of magnitude 7.1, 24 km (15 mi) from the coast was followed in 11 minutes by a tsunami about 15 metres (49 ft) high. The tsunami was generated by an underwater landslide, which was triggered by the earthquake. The towns of Arop and Warapu were destroyed. |
| 1999 | Sea of Marmara | 1999 İzmit earthquake | Earthquake | On 17 August 1999 an earthquake caused a tsunami in the Sea of Marmara, with a maximum water height of 2.52 m. 150 people died when the city of Degirmendere was flooded and another five were washed into the sea in Ulaşlı. |

== 2000–2010 ==
| Year | Location | Main Article | Primary Cause | Description |
|---|---|---|---|---|
| 2000 | Paatuut, Greenland | | Landslide | On 21 November 2000, a 90,000,000-cubic-metre (120,000,000 cu yd) landslide with a mass of 260,000,000 tons fell from an elevation of 1,000 to 1,400 metres (3,300 to 4,600 ft) at Paatuut on the Nuussuaq Peninsula on the west coast of Greenland, reaching a speed of 140 kilometres per hour (87 mph). About 30,000,000 cubic metres (39,000,000 cu yd) of material with a mass of 87,000,000 tons entered Sullorsuaq Strait (known in Danish as Vaigat Strait), generating a megatsunami. The wave had a run-up height of 50 metres (160 ft) near the landslide and 28 metres (92 ft) at Qullissat, the site of an abandoned settlement across the strait on Disko Island, 20 kilometres (11 nmi; 12 mi) away, where it inundated the coast as far as 100 metres (330 ft) inland. Refracted energy from the tsunami created a wave with a run-up height of 3 metres (10 ft) that destroyed boats at the closest populated village, Saqqaq, on the southwestern coast of the Nuussuaq Peninsula 40 kilometres (25 mi) from the landslide. |
| 2002 | Tyrrhenian Sea | 2002 Stromboli tsunami | Landslide | In May 2002, the volcanic island of Stromboli entered a new phase of explosive activity that was initially characterized by gas and ash emission from the summit craters. On 30 December 2002, a seismic network recorded two large collapses of a huge portion of the Sciara del Fuoco, which resulted in tsunamis. |
| 2002 | Bird's Head Peninsula, Indonesia | 2002 West Papua earthquake | Earthquake | A magnitude 7.6 earthquake off the eastern coast of West Papua triggered a tsunami which struck the towns of Ransiki and Oranbaru at a height of 3–5 m (10–16 ft), with a 1 m (3 ft) surge damaging dozens of homes in Manokwari and other areas surrounding the Doreri Bay. |
| 2003 | Hokkaido, Japan | 2003 Tokachi earthquake | Earthquake | A magnitude 8.3 earthquake in the Pacific Ocean off the southeastern coast of Hokkaido on 26 September 2003 created a tsunami that struck Hokkaido with a height of up to 4 metres (13 ft). |
| 2004 | Indian Ocean | 2004 Indian Ocean earthquake and tsunami | Earthquake | Animation showing the tsunami radiation from the 1,600 km (1,000 mi) rupture The 2004 Indian Ocean earthquake (moment magnitude 9.1–9.3) triggered a series of tsunamis on 26 December 2004 that devastated coastlines surrounding the Indian Ocean, killing an estimated 227,898 people (167,540 in Indonesia alone), making it the deadliest tsunami and one of the deadliest natural disasters in recorded history. The earthquake was the second largest earthquake in recorded history. The initial surge was measured at a height of approximately 33 meters (108 ft), making it one of the largest earthquake-generated tsunamis in recorded history. The tsunami killed people from the immediate vicinity of the earthquake in Indonesia, Thailand, and the northwest coast of Malaysia, to thousands of miles away in Bangladesh, India, Sri Lanka, the Maldives, and as far afield as Somalia, Kenya, and Tanzania. This tsunami that crossed the Indian Ocean is an example of a teletsunami, which travels great distances across the open ocean, and an ocean-wide tsunami. It became known as the "Boxing Day Tsunami" because it hit on Boxing Day (26 December). Unlike the Pacific Ocean, there was no organized warning service covering the Indian Ocean. This was due in part to the absence of major tsunamis since August 1883 (the Krakatoa eruption, see above). In light of the 2004 Indian Ocean tsunami, UNESCO and other world bodies called for an international tsunami monitoring system. |
| 2006 | South of Java Island | 2006 Pangandaran earthquake and tsunami | Earthquake | A magnitude 7.7 earthquake shook the seabed of the Indian Ocean on 17 July 2006, 200 km (120 mi) south of Pangandaran, a beach famous among surfers for its perfect waves. This earthquake triggered tsunamis with heights ranging from 2 metres (7 ft) at Cilacap to 6 metres (20 ft) at Cimerak beach, where it flattened and leveled buildings up to 400 metres (1,300 ft) from the coastline. More than 800 people were reported missing or dead. |
| 2006 | Kuril Islands | 2006 Kuril Islands earthquake | Earthquake | On 15 November 2006, a magnitude 8.3 earthquake occurred off the coast near the Kuril Islands. A relatively large tsunami was generated, with waves reaching 21.9 m (72 ft). This tsunami was also observed in Japan and at distant locations throughout the Pacific. In Crescent City, California, a 1.76 m (5.8 ft) high tsunami caused an estimated $10 million USD in damages. |
| 2007 | Solomon Islands | 2007 Solomon Islands earthquake | Earthquake | On 2 April 2007, a magnitude 8.1 earthquake struck about 40 km (25 mi) south of Ghizo Island in the western Solomon Islands at 07:39, triggering a tsunami of up to 12 metres (39 ft) tall. The wave, which hit the coast of the Solomon Islands (mainly Choiseul, Ghizo Island, Ranongga, and Simbo), triggered tsunami watches and warnings that spread from Japan to New Zealand, Hawaii and eastern Australia. The tsunami killed 52 people and dozens were injured as the waves inundated cities. A state of national emergency was declared for the Solomon Islands. On Choiseul Island, a 9.1-metre (30 ft) high wall of water was reported to have swept nearly 400 metres (1,300 ft) inland. The largest waves hit the northern tip of Simbo Island, where two villages, Tapurai and Riquru, were completely destroyed by a 12-metre (39 ft) wave, killing 10 people. Authorities estimated that the tsunami displaced more than 5,000 residents throughout the archipelago. |
| 2007 | Chile | 2007 Aysén Fjord earthquake | Earthquake and landslide | On 21 April 2007, an earthquake of magnitude 6.2 occurred in the Aysén Fjord. In the mountains around the fjord, the earthquake triggered landslides that in turn created waves up to 50 m (160 ft) high, severely damaging some salmon aquaculture facilities. The drinking water systems of the cities of Puerto Chacabuco and Puerto Aisén were broken, forcing firefighters and the army to supply water. The electricity network of Puerto Chacabuco was also cut. Ten people were reported dead or missing. |
| 2007 | British Columbia | | Landslide | On 4 December 2007, a landslide entered Chehalis Lake in British Columbia, generating a large tsunami in the lake that destroyed camps and vegetation many metres above the shoreline. The wave had a run-up height of 37.8 m (124 ft) on the lake's opposite shore, 0.8 km (0.5 mi) away from the slide, and was 6.3 m (21 ft) tall at the lake's exit point, 7.5 km (4.7 mi) away to the south.The wave then continued down the Chehalis River for about 15 km (9.3 mi). |
| 2009 | Franklin D. Roosevelt Lake, Washington, United States | | Landslide | A section of the shoreline about 7 hectares (17 acres) in area adjacent to the mouth of the Spokane River collapsed into the lake on January 16, 2009, generating a tsunami which reached a maximum height of 9.1 metres (30 ft) along the opposite shore 900 metres (3,000 ft) away. |
| 2009 | Franklin D. Roosevelt Lake, Washington, United States | | Landslide | A section of a hillside collapsed into the lake on August 25, 2009, generating a tsunami with an initial wave height of 6.1 metres (20 ft) which reached the opposite shore less than 900 metres (3,000 ft) away with a height of 3.7 metres (12 ft). It struck a campground there and washed a number of people into the lake, but all survived. |
| 2009 | Samoa | 2009 Samoa earthquake and tsunami | Earthquake | An undersea earthquake occurred in the Samoan Islands region at 06:48 local time on 29 September 2009. This magnitude 8.1 earthquake in the outer elevation of the Kermadec-Tonga subduction zone was the largest earthquake of 2009. The subsequent tsunami caused substantial damage and loss of life in Samoa, American Samoa, and Tonga. The Pacific Tsunami Warning Center recorded a 76 mm (3.0 in) rise in sea level near the epicenter, and New Zealand scientists noted waves up to 14 m (46 ft) off the coast of Samoa. More than 189 people, especially children, were killed, most of them in Samoa. Large waves without major damage were reported in Fiji, the north coast of New Zealand and Rarotonga in the Cook Islands. People from the low-lying atolls of Tokelau moved to higher ground as a precautionary measure. |
| 2010 | Chile | 2010 Chile earthquake | Earthquake | On 27 February 2010, an 8.8 earthquake off the coast of Chile triggered a tsunami that caused severe damage and loss of life, also causing minor effects in other Pacific nations. |
| 2010 | Sumatra | 2010 Mentawai earthquake and tsunami | Earthquake | On 25 October 2010, a 7.7 earthquake struck near the island of South Pagai in Indonesia, triggering a localized tsunami that killed at least 408 people. |

== 2011–2020 ==
| Year | Location | Main Article | Primary Cause | Description |
|---|---|---|---|---|
| 2011 | New Zealand | 2011 Christchurch earthquake | Earthquake-triggered ice fall | On 22 February 2011, a magnitude 6.3 earthquake struck the Canterbury region of the South Island of New Zealand. About 200 kilometres (120 mi) from the epicenter of the earthquake, around 30 million tons of ice fell from the Tasman Glacier into Tasman Lake, producing a series of 3.5-metre (11 ft) high tsunami waves, which hit tourist boats on the lake. |
| 2011 | Pacific coast of Japan | 2011 Tōhoku earthquake and tsunami | Earthquake | NOAA animation of the tsunami's propagation On 11 March 2011, off the Pacific coast of Japan, a magnitude 9.1 earthquake produced a 10-metre (30 ft) high tsunami along the northeast coast of Japan. The wave caused widespread devastation, with an official count of 18,550 people confirmed dead or missing. The highest recorded tsunami in Miyako, Iwate, reached a total height of 40.5 metres (133 ft). Additionally, the tsunami precipitated multiple hydrogen and hydrogen/oxygen explosions at the Fukushima I Nuclear Power Plant. Tsunami warnings were issued for the entire Pacific Rim. |
| 2012 | Philippines | 2012 Negros earthquake | Earthquake | The 6.7 earthquake on February 6, 2012, earthquake in the Tañon Strait generated a tsunami up to 5 metres (16 ft) high on the coast of Negros which swept away houses and cars in several small villages. |
| 2012 | El Salvador, Honduras and Nicaragua | 2012 El Salvador earthquake | Earthquake | On 26 August 2012, a magnitude 7.3 earthquake triggered local tsunami waves of up to 6 metres (20 ft) along a small stretch of the coast of El Salvador, injuring at least 40 people. Smaller waves were recorded in Honduras, Nicaragua and the Galápagos Islands. |
| 2013 | Solomon Islands | 2013 Solomon Islands earthquake | Earthquake | On 6 February 2013, an earthquake measuring 8.0 on the Moment Magnitude scale struck the island nation of the Solomon Islands. This earthquake created tsunami waves up to around 1 metre (3 ft) high. The tsunami also affected other islands such as New Caledonia and Vanuatu. |
| 2014 | Iceland | Askja | Landslide | At 23:24 on 21 July 2014, in a period experiencing an earthquake swarm related to the upcoming eruption of Bárðarbunga, an 800-metre (2,600 ft) wide section gave way on the slopes of the Icelandic volcano Askja. Starting at 350 metres (1,150 ft) above water height, it caused a tsunami 20 to 30 metres (70 to 100 ft) high through the caldera and potentially larger at localized impact points. Thanks to the late hour, there were no tourists present; however, search and rescue personnel noted a cloud of steam rising from the volcano, apparently geothermal steam released by the landslide. It is not known if geothermal activity played a role in the landslide. The landslide involved a total of 30 to 50 million cubic metres (39 to 65 million cubic yards) of material, which raised the water level in the caldera by 1 to 2 metres (3 to 7 ft). |
| 2015 | Chile | 2015 Chile earthquake | Earthquake | On Wednesday 16 September 2015, a large earthquake measuring 8.3 on the Moment Magnitude scale struck the west coast of Chile, causing a tsunami up to 13.6 metres (44.6 ft) high along the Chilean coast. |
| 2015 | Taan Fiord, Alaska, U.S. | Icy Bay (Alaska) | Landslide | On Saturday 17 October 2015, a large landslide occurred at the head of Taan Fiord, a finger of Icy Bay. It triggered a mega-tsunami with an initial height of 100 metres (330 ft) and a breakthrough on the opposite shore of the fjord of 193 metres (633 ft). As the wave traveled up Taan Fiord towards Icy Bay, surges along the fjord's shoreline ranged from 20 metres (70 ft) to more than 100 metres (330 ft). |
| 2016 | Santa Catarina, Brazil | | Meteorology | On 16 October 2016, a meteotsunami struck Balneário Rincão and nearby areas in southern Santa Catarina, Brazil. A sudden rise in the sea inundated the beach and swept vehicles and other objects inland, causing property damage. The event occurred during the passage of an intense atmospheric instability line, with changes in atmospheric pressure, the storm's movement and local bathymetry contributing to the amplification of the waves. |
| 2016 | New Zealand | 2016 Kaikōura earthquake | Earthquake | On 14 November 2016, a major earthquake struck the South Island of New Zealand with a magnitude of 7.5 to 7.8. A 2.5-metre (8.2 ft) tsunami hit Kaikōura and other small waves of less than 1 metre (3 ft) hit several New Zealand coasts. |
| 2017 | Iran | | Meteorology | On 19 March 2017, a series of waves from the Persian Gulf inundated significant parts of the Port of Dayyer on the southern coast of Iran. The waves reportedly capsized about 300 boats, caused approximately US$10 million in damage, and resulted in one death and five people missing. |
| 2017 | North Holland, Netherlands | | Meteorology | On 29 May 2017, a meteotsunami struck the Dutch coast, particularly around Zandvoort and Bloemendaal in North Holland. The wave reached approximately 2–3 metres (6.6–9.8 ft) in height and swept across the beaches, carrying away beach furniture, boats and parasols. The event was caused by a rapidly moving squall line that generated sudden atmospheric pressure changes, with Proudman resonance contributing to the amplification of the wave as it approached the coast. No fatalities or serious injuries were reported, although some property damage occurred. |
| 2017 | Greenland | | Landslide | On 17 June 2017, a 300 m × 1,100 m (980 ft × 3,610 ft) landslide fell approximately 1,000 m (3,280 ft) into Karrat Fjord in the Uummannaq area of western Greenland. The resulting tsunami hit the Nuugaatsiaq settlement, killing four people, injuring nine, and dragging eleven buildings into the water. The tsunami was initially 90 m (300 ft) high, but was significantly lower once it hit the settlement. It was initially unclear if the landslide was caused by a small earthquake (magnitude 4), but it was later confirmed that the landslide had caused the tremors. |
| 2018 | Sulawesi | 2018 Sulawesi earthquake and tsunami | Earthquake-triggered underwater landslide | On 28 September 2018, a localized tsunami struck Palu, sweeping away homes and buildings on the coast in its way; the earthquake, tsunami and soil liquefaction killed at least 4,340 and injured more than 10,670. Waves up to 10.7 m (35 ft) hit the cities of Palu, Donggala and Mamuju. |
| 2018 | Sanibel, Florida, United States | | Meteorology | On 20 December 2018, a meteotsunami affected the southwestern coast of Florida, particularly Sanibel and Captiva islands and the Naples area. The event produced waves of approximately 1.5 m (4.9 ft) and flooded coastal areas and damaged infrastructure. It was associated with a cold front that caused sudden changes in atmospheric pressure and temperature. |
| 2018 | Java and Sumatra | 2018 Sunda Strait tsunami | Volcanic-eruption-triggered landslide | At 21:03 local time (14:03 UTC) on 22 December 2018, Anak Krakatoa erupted, damaging local seismographic equipment, although a nearby seismographic station detected continuing tremors. BMKG detected a tsunami event around 21:27 local time (14:27 UTC) off the western coast of Banten, but the agency had not detected any previous tectonic event. On 23 December it was confirmed via satellite data and helicopter footage that the southwestern sector of the Anak Krakatoa had collapsed, triggering the tsunami and the main conduit is now erupting underwater producing Surtseyan-style activity. The Indonesian National Disaster Management Board initially reported 20 deaths and 165 injuries. By 29 December, the number of dead had risen to 426, while the wounded numbered 7,202 and the missing 24. |
| 2020 | Aegean Sea | 2020 Aegean Sea earthquake | Earthquake | On 30 October 2020, a magnitude 7.0 earthquake triggered a tsunami that inundated the Greek islands of Ikaria, Kos, Chios, and Samos as well as several other islands and coastal areas in Greece and Turkey, where it mainly affected Sığacık in Seferihisar. An 87-year-old woman drowned in Sığacık, Turkey. Tsunami heights were as high as 6 metres (20 ft). |
| 2020 | Elliot Creek, British Columbia, Canada | | Landslide | On 28 November 2020, unseasonably heavy rainfall triggered an 18-million-cubic-metre (24-million-cubic-yard) landslide into a glacial lake at the head of Elliot Creek, generating a magnitude 5.0 earthquake and a 100 m (330 ft) high megatsunami that rushed down Elliot Creek and the Southgate River to the head of Bute Inlet, covering a total distance of over 60 km (37 mi) and destroying over 8.5 km (5.3 mi) of salmon habitat along Elliot Creek. |

== 2021–present ==
| Year | Location | Main Article | Primary Cause | Description |
|---|---|---|---|---|
| 2021 | South Pacific | 2021 Kermadec Islands earthquake | Earthquake | On 5 March 2021, a magnitude 8.1 earthquake occurred in the Kermadec-Tonga subduction zone, generating a minor tsunami that primarily affected Norfolk Island and New Zealand. Major evacuations were carried out along the New Zealand coast in Northland, Auckland, Bay of Plenty, and Gisborne following tsunami warnings. A tsunami surge 64 centimetres (25 in) high hit Norfolk Island and tsunami waves 30 to 40 centimetres (12 to 16 in) high hit New Zealand, while a much larger tsunami 2.64 m (8.7 ft) in height hit Raoul Island, closest to the epicentre of the earthquake. |
| 2021 | Ambon | | Earthquake-triggered underwater landslide | On 16 June 2021, a magnitude 5.9 (USGS) or 6.1 (BMKG) undersea earthquake near Ambon Island in Indonesia, triggered an underwater landslide. The landslide then triggered a small tsunami up to 0.5 metres (1.6 ft) high that hit the shoreline four minutes later. Both the earthquake and tsunami caused some damage to homes, but there were no casualties. |
| 2021 | Alaska | 2021 Chignik earthquake | Earthquake | A magnitude 8.2 earthquake struck the Aleutian Islands in Alaska. The earthquake was the seventh largest to strike the United States and was preceded by a magnitude 7.8 foreshock in 2020. The mainshock triggered a tsunami that reached 2.63 m (8.6 ft). |
| 2021 | South Atlantic | 2021 South Sandwich Islands earthquakes | Earthquake | On 12 August 2021, a magnitude 7.5 earthquake, followed several minutes later by a magnitude 8.1 mainshock struck the South Atlantic, in the South Sandwich Islands archipelago, a British Overseas Territory. They were some of the most complex earthquakes ever recorded, and generated a tsunami that was quite small for the quakes' size, reaching a maximum height of 0.75 m (2.5 ft). However the tsunami reached detectable wave heights as far as Portugal and Madagascar, becoming the first tsunami to be detected in four or more oceans since the 2004 Indian Ocean tsunami. |
| 2022 | Tonga | 2022 Hunga Tonga–Hunga Haʻapai eruption and tsunami | Volcanic-eruption | NOAA animation of the tsunami's propagation A major eruption of Hunga Tonga, a volcanic island in Tonga in the Pacific Ocean, occurred on 15 January 2022. The eruption caused tsunamis in Tonga and Fiji. Tsunami warnings were issued for Fiji, Samoa, New Zealand, Australia, the United States, Japan and Canada. The tsunami reached 15 metres (50 ft) in Tonga. |
| 2022 | Philippines | Tropical Storm Megi | Landslide | On 12 April 2022, a landslide caused by heavy rain due to Tropical Storm Megi created tsunami waves in Abuyog that killed two people and injured dozens more. |
| 2022 | Mexico | 2022 Michoacán earthquake | Earthquake | A magnitude 7.6-7.7 earthquake struck near the coast of western Mexico on 19 September 2022. A tsunami about 1.75 m (5.7 ft) high was reported near the epicentre. The tsunami was detected as far away as Ecuador, where tsunami waves as high as 12 cm (4.7 in) were observed. |
| 2023 | Greenland | 2023 Greenland landslide | Landslide | On 16 September 2023, a large landslide originating 300–400 m (1,000–1,300 ft) above sea level entered Dickson Fjord, triggering a megatsunami exceeding 200 m (660 ft) in run-up height. A run-up of 60 m (200 ft) was observed along a 10 km (6 mi) stretch of coast, forming a seiche oscillation that decayed over a period of nine days. |
| 2023 | Japan | | Volcanic-eruption / Earthquake | Many "peculiar" earthquakes associated with a volcanic eruption were recorded on 9 October 2023. The source was later determined to be the Sofu seamount. A pumice raft was recorded on 20 October, suggesting recent eruptive activity. The maximum height of the October 9 event was 60 cm (2.0 ft). In addition, three earthquakes in the area with M≥6.0 were recorded on October 3, 5, and 6, two of which generated tsunamis with a height of 0.2 m (0.66 ft). |
| 2023 | Santa Catarina, Brazil | | Meteorology | On 11 November 2023, a meteotsunami struck Praia do Cardoso in Laguna, Santa Catarina, Brazil, at around 4:00 p.m. The sudden advance of the sea flooded the beach and swept several vehicles into the water, causing property damage but no reported injuries. Tide gauges in Laguna and nearby Imbituba recorded multiple long-period waves lasting approximately 14–16 minutes. The event was associated with a line of instability that generated sudden atmospheric pressure changes and strong wind gusts, with resonance between the atmospheric disturbance and ocean waves amplifying the phenomenon. |
| 2024 | Japan | 2024 Noto earthquake | Earthquake | On 1 January 2024, a magnitude 7.5 earthquake struck the western coast of Japan, triggering the first major tsunami warning since the 2011 Tōhoku earthquake, being issued for Ishikawa Prefecture at an estimated height of 5 metres (16 ft). Joetsu city in Niigata Prefecture observed a tsunami with a height of more than 6.6 metres (21.7 ft), Wajima experienced a tsunami with a height of more than 11.3 metres (37.1 ft). Kanazawa City in Ishikawa Prefecture observed a tsunami at a height of 0.9 metres (3 ft). Toyama City in Toyama Prefecture and Sakata City in Yamagata Prefecture both observed a tsunami with a height of 0.8 metres (31 in). In Suzu City in Ishikawa Prefecture, some homes were left with only their foundations, being washed inland. Small towns such as Shiromaru and Ukai reported severe damage with houses swept off their foundations several blocks inland. Research found that at least 26 of the 645 deaths from the earthquake were likely caused by the tsunami. |
| 2024 | Pedersen Lagoon, Alaska, United States | | Landslide | On 7 August 2024, a landslide originating from north of Pedersen Glacier entered a lagoon, triggering a localised tsunami that damaged wooden boardwalks in the tidal zone at a lodge and struck a National Park Service campsite easement. The tsunami reached a maximum height of 17 metres (56 ft). |
| 2024 | Santa Catarina, Brazil | | Meteorology | On 2 December 2024, a meteotsunami struck Jaguaruna, Santa Catarina, Brazil, during the early morning. The sea suddenly advanced inland, while a tide gauge in nearby Balneário Rincão recorded a temporary rise in sea level of approximately 1 m. The event was associated with an intense line of thunderstorms that caused rapid changes in atmospheric pressure and strong winds. No injuries or serious damage were reported. |
| 2025 | Kamchatka, Russia | 2025 Kamchatka earthquake | Earthquake | On 30 July 2025, a magnitude 8.8 earthquake struck off the eastern coast of the Kamchatka Peninsula and triggered tsunami warnings across the Pacific. Waves with estimated heights of 15 to 19 metres (49 to 62 ft) struck unpopulated sections of the Kamchatka coastline, though in populated areas waves were limited to 5 to 6 metres (16 to 20 ft). |
| 2025 | Tracy Arm, Alaska, United States | | Landslide | On 10 August 2025, a landslide with a volume of at least 100,000,000 cubic metres (130,000,000 cubic yards) occurred near the terminus of South Sawyer Glacier in Tracy Arm, a fjord in Southeast Alaska. Some or most of the landslide entered the waters of Tracy Arm, triggering a tsunami with a run-up on the opposite shore of 470 to 500 metres (1,542 to 1,640 ft) and of at least 30 metres (98 ft) on nearby Sawyer Island. The tsunami damaged tents and kayaks at a camping site on Harbour Island at the mouth of Tracy Arm, where tsunami waves reached an estimated height of 3.0 to 4.6 metres (10 to 15 ft) and water rose to at least 7.6 metres (25 ft) above the high tide line. A gauge at Juneau, Alaska, 80 miles (129 km) from the landslide, recorded tsunami waves with a maximum height of 36 centimetres (14 in). |
| 2026 | Buenos Aires, Argentina | | Meteorology | On 12 January 2026, a meteotsunami affected the Buenos Aires coast of Argentina, particularly Santa Clara del Mar, Mar Chiquita, Camet, and Mar del Plata. The sudden rise in sea level swept people and belongings from the beaches, resulting in one death and at least 35 injuries. |
| 2026 | Honshu, Japan | 2026 Sanriku earthquake | Earthquake | On 20 April 2026, a magnitude 7.7 earthquake struck off the coast of Sanriku, northeastern Honshu, Japan, prompting the JMA to issue tsunami warnings for parts of Iwate Prefecture, Aomori, and Hokkaido, where waves of up to 3 metres (9.8 ft) were expected. The warnings were later downgraded to advisories, and were lifted at 23:50 JST. A tsunami measuring 80-centimeter-high (31 in) was recorded at Kuji, Iwate. Waves of 40 centimeters (16 in) were observed at Miyako and Urakawa, Hokkaido, while 30-centimeter (12 in) waves reached Hiroo, Erimo, and Sendai, Miyagi. |
| 2026 | Mindanao, Philippines | 2026 Mindanao earthquake | Earthquake | On 8 June 2026, a magnitude 7.8 earthquake struck offshore of Sarangani, Mindanao, Philippines, generating a tsunami that prompted warnings and evacuations across several coastal provinces in Mindanao and neighboring countries. Small tsunami waves and minor sea-level disturbances were recorded along the coasts of southern Mindanao, including Sarangani and General Santos, causing minor damage to six coastal shanties. The tsunami was recorded by DOST-PHIVOLCS sea level monitoring stations, with a maximum wave height of 1.48 m (4.9 ft) at Kiamba, Sarangani. Other stations recorded wave heights of 0.84 m at Kalamansig, Sultan Kudarat; 0.48 m at Maasim, Sarangani; 0.25 m at Zamboanga City; 0.21 m at Mati, Davao Oriental; and 0.09 m at Tandag, Surigao del Sur. Two people drowned and another was reported missing after being swept out to sea off General Santos, while four others were rescued. The tsunami warning was lifted later the same day after sea-level monitoring data indicated that the observed waves were too small to cause significant damage. |
| 2026 | Adriatic Sea | | Meteorology | On 15–27 July 2026, a series of meteotsunamis affected the eastern Adriatic coast, including several locations in Croatia. Five events were recorded at seven tide-gauge stations between Mali Lošinj and Sobra on the island of Mljet, while eyewitnesses reported flooding and unusual sea-level oscillations at Mali Lošinj, the Kornati Islands, Stari Grad and Vrboska on Hvar, Milna on Brač, Vela Luka on Korčula, and Vis. The events were associated with convective weather systems and atmospheric disturbances propagating across the Adriatic. |
| 2026 | Flores, Indonesia | 2026 Flores earthquake | Earthquake | On 15 August 2026, a magnitude 7.8 earthquake struck the Flores region of Indonesia, with its epicenter approximately 30 km northeast of Nagekeo, East Nusa Tenggara, at a depth of 15 km. The earthquake generated a tsunami that affected coastal areas of Flores and surrounding regions, with waves of up to 1.61 m recorded at Riung. A tsunami warning was issued following the earthquake and was later lifted after the threat had subsided. |
| 2026 | Santa Catarina, Brazil | | Meteorology | On 21 September 2026, a meteotsunami struck the coast of Santa Catarina, Brazil, affecting Laguna, Jaguaruna and Imbituba. The event caused a sudden rise in sea level around 6:00 a.m., flooding beaches, streets and buildings and sweeping boats and fishing equipment inland. The meteotsunami was associated with a line of atmospheric instability, rapid atmospheric-pressure changes and southerly wind gusts of 60–90 km/h (37–56 mph). The surge caused flooding and damage to buildings and coastal infrastructure, while sand and debris were deposited on streets. No deaths or injuries were reported. |

== Highest or tallest ==
- The tsunami with the highest run-up was the 1958 Lituya Bay megatsunami, which had a record height of 524 m (1,719 ft).
- The only other recent megatsunamis are the 1963 Vajont Dam megatsunami, which had an initial height of 250 m (820 ft), the 1980 Spirit Lake megatsunami, which measured 260 m (850 ft) tall, the 2015 megatsunami in Taan Fiord, a finger of Icy Bay in Alaska, which had an estimated initial height of 100 metres (330 ft) and a run-up of 193 metres (633 ft), and the 2025 megatsunami in Tracy Arm, with an estimated run-up of 470–500 m (1,540–1,640 ft).
- A tsunami caused by a landslide during the 1964 Alaska earthquake reached a height of 70 m (230 ft), making it one of the largest tsunamis in recorded history.

== Deadliest ==
The deadliest tsunami in recorded history was the 2004 Indian Ocean tsunami, which killed almost 230,000 people in fourteen countries including (listed in order of confirmed fatalities) Indonesia, Sri Lanka, India, Thailand, Somalia, Myanmar, Maldives, Malaysia, Tanzania, Seychelles, Bangladesh, South Africa, Yemen and Kenya. There were also many injuries and extensive property damage.

== See also ==
- List of deadly earthquakes since 1900
- List of natural disasters by death toll
- List of tsunamis in Europe
- Lists of earthquakes
- Prehistoric tsunamis
- Tsunamis affecting the British Isles
- Tsunamis in lakes
