= Prehistoric tsunamis =

Tsunamis that occurred before recorded history

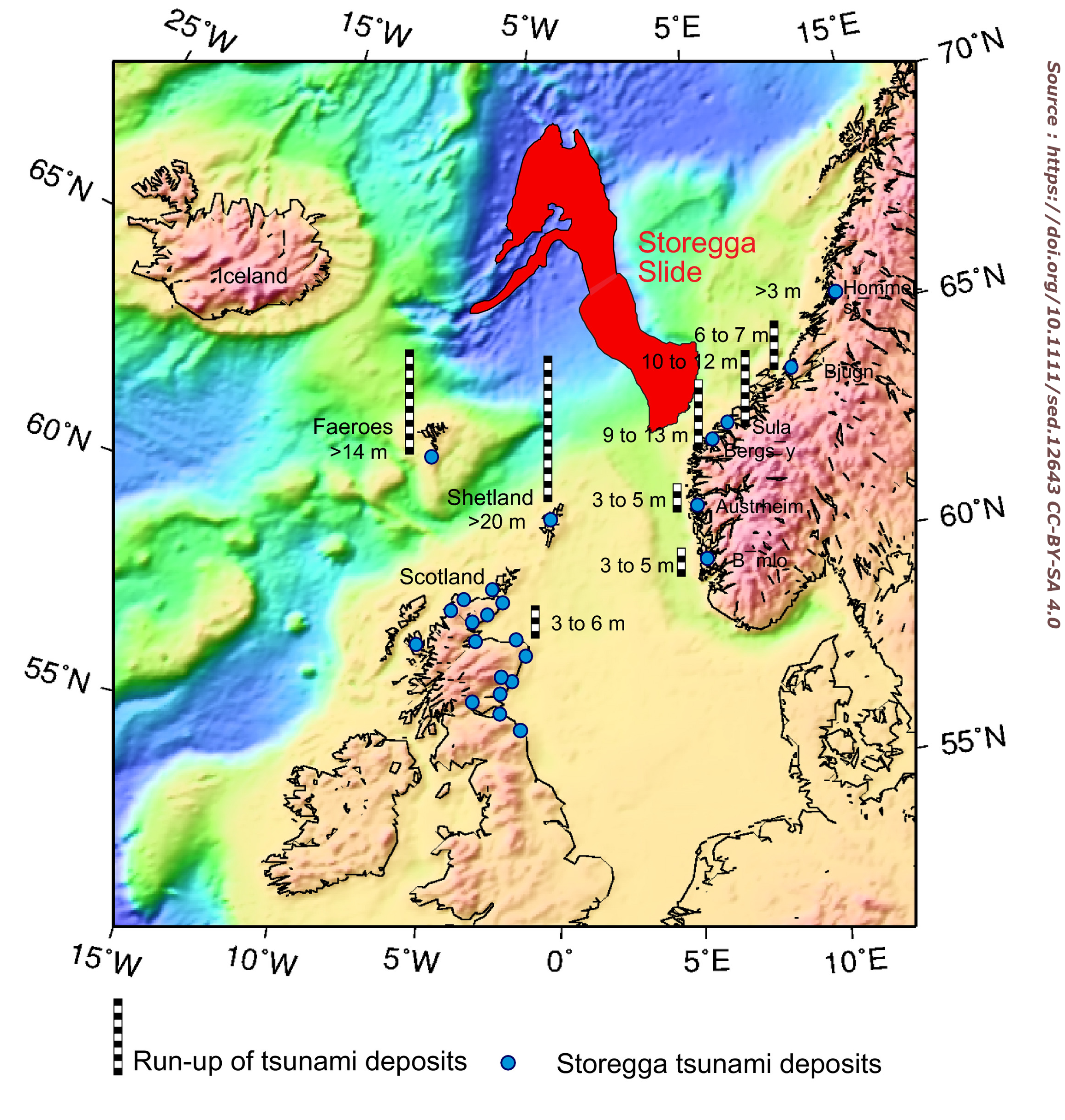
The Storegga Slide (red). The blue dots show locations where tsunami deposits have been identified.

Prehistoric tsunamis are tsunamis and so-called "megatsunamis" that occurred before recorded history. The events have been identified through oral tradition and/or geological evidence. Those events that have been identified through contemporary records are listed as historic tsunamis.

== List ==
Approx. date	Location	Cause	Evidence for tsunami
66 million years BP	Chicxulub crater, Yucatan	asteroid strike	presumed
35.5 million years BP	Chesapeake Bay	bolide impact	presumed
10,000 yrs BP	Seton Portage, British Columbia	landslide into lake	presumed
8,000 years BP	Mount Etna, Sicily	volcanic landslide	submarine sediments off Etna, submerged settlements off eastern Mediterranean coast, e.g. Atlit Yam
8,000 years BP	Norwegian Sea	submarine landslip (Storegga Slide)	deposited sediments in Scotland
5,500 BP	Northern Isles	tsunami (Garth tsunami)	deposits and contemporaneous mass burials
4,000 BP	Réunion island	landslide	presumed
