= 426 BC Malian Gulf tsunami =

Natural disaster in Ancient Greece

- Location within Greece
- Local date: 426 BC
- Magnitude: Unknown
- Epicenter: 38.87°N 22.62°E
- Areas affected: Ancient Greece
- Tsunami: Yes
- Casualties: Unknown

The 426 BC Malian Gulf tsunami devastated the coasts of the Malian and Euboean Gulfs, Greece, in the summer of 426 BC. Thucydides inquired into its causes, and concluded that the tsunami must have been caused by an earthquake. He was thus historically the first known to correctly interpret the cause of a tsunami as a preceding geological event. Herodotus, in contrast, had attributed the Potidaea tsunami to the divine wrath of Poseidon.

== Ancient records ==
The Malian Gulf paleotsunami was caused by one of a series of earthquakes in the summer of 426 BC which affected the course of the Peloponnesian War by forcing the advancing Spartans to abort their planned invasion of Attica. Strabo reported that throughout Greece parts of islands were submerged, rivers permanently displaced and towns devastated. The tsunami itself hit the coast of the Malian Gulf at three different places, reaching towns as far as three quarters of a mile inland. The force of the tsunami was such that at one place a trireme was lifted out of its dock and thrown over a city wall.

Thucydides gave the following account, noting the characteristic sequence of quake, receding water and huge wave:

About the same time that these earthquakes were so common, the sea at Orobiae, in Euboea, retiring from the then line of coast, returned in a huge wave and invaded a great part of the town, and retreated leaving some of it still under water; so that what was once land is now sea; such of the inhabitants perishing as could not run up to the higher ground in time. A similar inundation also occurred at Atalanta, the island off the Opuntian-Locrian coast, carrying away part of the Athenian fort and wrecking one of two ships which were drawn up on the beach. At Peparethus also the sea retreated a little, without however any inundation following; and an earthquake threw down part of the wall, the town hall, and a few other buildings.

...

The cause, in my opinion, of this phenomenon must be sought in the earthquake. At the point where its shock has been the most violent the sea is driven back, and suddenly recoiling with redoubled force, causes the inundation. Without an earthquake I do not see how such an accident could happen.

While the epicentre of the 426 BC Malian Gulf tsunami quake is yet to be located, evidence points at a crustal movement along one of the faults in the Euboean gulf, rather than submarine landslides.

== See also ==
- 365 Crete earthquake
- List of tsunamis
