= Orobiae =

Town on the western coast of ancient Euboea

Coordinates: 38°49′01″N 23°13′27″E

Orobiae or Orobiai (Ancient Greek: Ὀρόβιαι) was a town on the western coast of ancient Euboea, between Aedepsus and Aegae, which possessed an oracle of Apollo Selinuntius. The town was partly destroyed by an earthquake and an inundation of the sea in the 426 BC Malian Gulf tsunami. This town seems to be the one mentioned by Stephanus of Byzantium under the name of Orope (Ὀρόπη), who describes it as "a city of Euboea, having a very renowned temple of Apollo."

Its site is located near the modern village of Rovies.
