= Teletsunami =

Massive tsunamis that strike a thousand kilometers or more from their source

The 2004 Indian Ocean tsunami was a teletsunami.

A teletsunami (also called an ocean-wide tsunami, distant tsunami, distant-source tsunami, far-field tsunami, or trans-ocean tsunami) is a tsunami that originates from a distant source, defined as more than 1,000 km (620 mi) away or three hours' travel from the area of interest, sometimes travelling across an ocean. All known teletsunamis have been generated by major earthquakes such as the 1755 Lisbon earthquake, 1922 Vallenar earthquake, 1960 Valdivia earthquake, 1964 Alaska earthquake, 2004 Indian Ocean earthquake, 2011 Tohoku earthquake, and 2021 South Sandwich Islands earthquakes.

== Overview ==
Three types of faults: A. Strike-slip B. Normal thrust C. Reverse thrust

Teletsunamis can be generated several different ways, the most common being earthquakes with magnitudes higher than 7.5. Vertical displacement on a thrust fault is more likely to produce a teletsunami than lateral displacement from strike-slip fault. Because of this, subduction zones, which occur when dense oceanic crust burrows underneath less-dense continental crust, are at greater risk of producing teletsunamis. The Pacific coast of North America is an example of a subduction zone: it includes the Cascadia subduction zone, which lies off the coasts of British Columbia, Washington, Oregon, and Northern California. The regions around the Aleutian Islands and Gulf of Alaska are also capable of producing large offshore earthquakes and thus large tsunamis.

Natural precursors that may indicate the approach of a teletsunami include a drawback, when the ocean water recedes well below low tide. While drawbacks may not always occur, their presence are considered a sign of impending danger.

== Characteristics ==
The general characteristics of teletsunamis are similar to those of local tsunamis. The interval between waves can range from 5 to 60 minutes, although it usually falls between 10 and 30 minutes. The speed at which the teletsunami travels is dependent on the depth of the water, decreasing as the water becomes more shallow. On average, tsunamis in the Pacific Ocean travel at about 773 km/h (480 mph); however, due to the depth of the ocean, the height may only be a few feet. The low amplitude, along with the broad wavelength, which spans approximately 80 to 240 kilometres (50 to 149 mi), makes vessels in open water unaware of the passing tsunami. In shallow water, scuba divers caught in the 2004 Indian Ocean tsunami were reportedly tossed around underwater, yet boats floating above were unaffected and failed to notice the wave as it passed by.

Teletsunamis generally consist of a series of waves rather than a single wave. The number of waves can vary, but data have shown that there are usually between two and ten. The first wave is typically not the largest one. During the 2004 Indian Ocean tsunami, the second wave was the largest, and in the 1964 Alaska tsunami, it was the fourth. The retreat of the first wave may falsely imply that the tsunami has "finished", which can lead people to return to the beach out of curiosity, only to be swept away by the next incoming wave.

Coastal water usually recedes before the first tsunami strikes, and many witnesses have reported that the approaching teletsunami waves create a loud roaring sound similar to that of a train or a jet.

== Tsunami watches and warnings ==
Although teletsunamis are usually generated by a large earthquake, many of the areas affected by the tsunami are too far from the earthquake's epicenter to feel it (hence the prefix tele-, or "distant", in "teletsunami"). Teletsunamis are also virtually undetectable to the human eye until they approach the shoreline. Several scientific organisations have been developed to establish tsunami warning system, which are to provide sufficient forewarning of an approaching teletsunami to initiate emergency preparations and evacuations.

The Pacific Tsunami Warning Center (PTWC) in Hawaii provides warnings for Pacific-based teletsunamis to almost every country around the Pacific, including island states.

The National Tsunami Warning Center (NTWC) in Palmer, Alaska, watches for teletsunamis approaching the West Coast of the United States and Canada. In order to prevent confusion, the PTWC does not issue watches or warnings for the west coast unless the NTWC fails to do so.

There are several guidelines set by the NTWC for issuing watches and warnings:

- A watch is first issued if the arrival time for a potential teletsunami is more than 2 hours from the time of the warning. In this case, there would be enough time to verify the existence or nonexistence of a tsunami by way of NOAA buoys before a warning or cancellation message was issued.
- Either a watch or warning is immediately issued if a magnitude 7.5 or greater earthquake occurs anywhere in the Pacific Rim, depending on circumstances.
- A warning is issued if the potentially resulting tsunami would arrive onshore within 2 hours of the warning.

For example, if an 8.0 earthquake occurs in the Aleutian Islands, West Coast states such as Washington, Oregon, and California would receive a tsunami watch first; if the tsunami is verified, a warning would follow. If no wave is observed, a cancellation message would follow the watch instead. If an 8.0 earthquake were to occur off of the West Coast of the United States, a warning without verification of a tsunami would be issued, as there would not be enough time to first verify a wave and then conduct an evacuation of vulnerable areas.

== Historical documentations ==
Destructive teletsunamis have been recorded as happening once or twice a century. One of the oldest teletsunamis reported was in November 1755, when a major earthquake known as the 1755 Lisbon earthquake (or the Great Lisbon earthquake) resulted in a teletsunami that ravaged Lisbon, Portugal. The teletsunami crossed the Atlantic and was noticed throughout the eastern Caribbean, from Barbados to Antigua and as far west as Cuba. The amplitude of the tsunami was maintained at about 2–3 m (6.6–9.8 ft), and waves continued to arrive for many hours. No damage or casualties were reported. European sources also reported that the Azores fracture zone generated a second teletsunami in March 1761 (1761 Portugal earthquake), but no local confirmed observations were made in the Caribbean.

The most recent teletsunami resulting in mass casualties occurred in 2004 off the northern coast of Sumatra, Indonesia. Caused by an undersea megathrust earthquake, it led to nearly 230,000 deaths in several countries along the Indian Ocean.

A few destructive teletsunamis are generated each century by large earthquakes around the Pacific Rim. Such tsunamis can propagate across the entire Pacific in less than 24 hours, and cause widespread destruction along shorelines located thousands of miles from the source. The most recent of these was generated by the 2011 Japan earthquake, which crushed three dozen boats in Crescent City, California.

=== 1700: Japan ===
A tsunami struck Japan occurred on January 26, 1700, and was not associated with an earthquake offshore of the country like most in Japanese historical records. This event has been linked now to a powerful earthquake on the Cascadia subduction zone.

=== 1868: Pacific Ocean ===
A tsunami triggered by the 1868 Arica earthquake caused significant damage in Hawaii and New Zealand where one fatality occurred; it was also recorded in Japan.

=== 1946: Hawaii ===
In 1946, following a large earthquake in the Aleutian Islands, a teletsunami that originated in Alaska devastated Hilo, Hawaii. Waves 30 feet (9.1 m) tall were observed in Hilo, and at least 170 people were killed. As there had been no warning issued, concerns led to the establishment of the Pacific Tsunami Warning Center in Ewa Beach, Hawaii. The tsunami was also observed in California, but no casualties were reported and damage was slight – limited mostly to personal vessels in the harbors.

=== 1960: Pacific Ocean ===
In 1960, a teletsunami generated near the coast of Chile again devastated Hilo, resulting in 61 deaths. The earthquake responsible was the largest earthquake ever recorded, with a magnitude of 9.5 that caused waves 35 feet (11 m) tall in Hilo. A warning was issued in Hilo beforehand that correctly predicted the tsunami's arrival time, though it did not provide sufficient time for the majority of residents to evacuate. The tsunami also struck Japan killing 138 and the Philippines killing 32.

=== 1964: West Coast of North America ===
In 1964, a large tsunami originated as a result of the 9.2 earthquake from the Gulf of Alaska. As a result, California observed 20–25-foot (6.1–7.6 m) waves and some regions sustained heavy damages from flooding, resulting in 11 deaths. Other regions such as Alaska, British Columbia, Washington, Oregon, and Hawaii were also impacted by the teletsunami to varying degrees.

=== 2004: Indian Ocean ===
The 2004 Indian Ocean tsunami caused approximately 230,000 fatalities, the majority of which were in Indonesia. The teletsunami was generated by the 9.1 earthquake off the northern coast of Sumatra and also heavily impacted Thailand, Malaysia, Myanmar, Sri Lanka, India, and Somalia. It was the first teletsunami to have extensive video evidence.

== See also ==
- Cumbre Vieja tsunami hazard
- Deep-ocean Assessment and Reporting of Tsunamis (DART)
- List of tsunamis
- Megathrust earthquake
- Megatsunami
- Meteotsunami
- Submarine earthquake
