= Aegae (Euboea) =

Town on the west coast of ancient Euboea

Coordinates: 38°35′10″N 23°33′18″E

Aegae or Aigai (Ancient Greek: Αἰγαί) was a town on the west coast of ancient Euboea, north of Chalcis and a little south of Orobiae, opposite the mainland city of Anthedon. It had disappeared in the time of the geographer Strabo. Strabo records a sanctuary of Aegean Poseidon on a mountain nearby.

It seems to be distinct from legendary Aegae, the namesake of the Aegean Sea, which was situated on the east coast of the island, near modern Kymi. It's not unlikely that Aegae got actually switched to Kymi/Cuma, as the generic name Kymi/Cuma, just means city in the Aeolic dialect.

Legendary Aegae is mentioned e.g. by Homer in Book 5 of the Odyssey, in which Poseidon "lashed his long-maned horses and drove to Aegae, where he had his famous palace" after having destroyed Odysseus' raft with a storm. It was also mentioned by Homer in Book 13 of the Iliad, in which Poseidon "[took three strides], and with the fourth he reached his goal—Aegae, where is his glittering golden palace, imperishable, in the depths of the sea."

Its site is located near the modern Politika Kafkala.
