= 2021 South Sandwich Islands earthquakes =

Earthquakes in the Atlantic Ocean

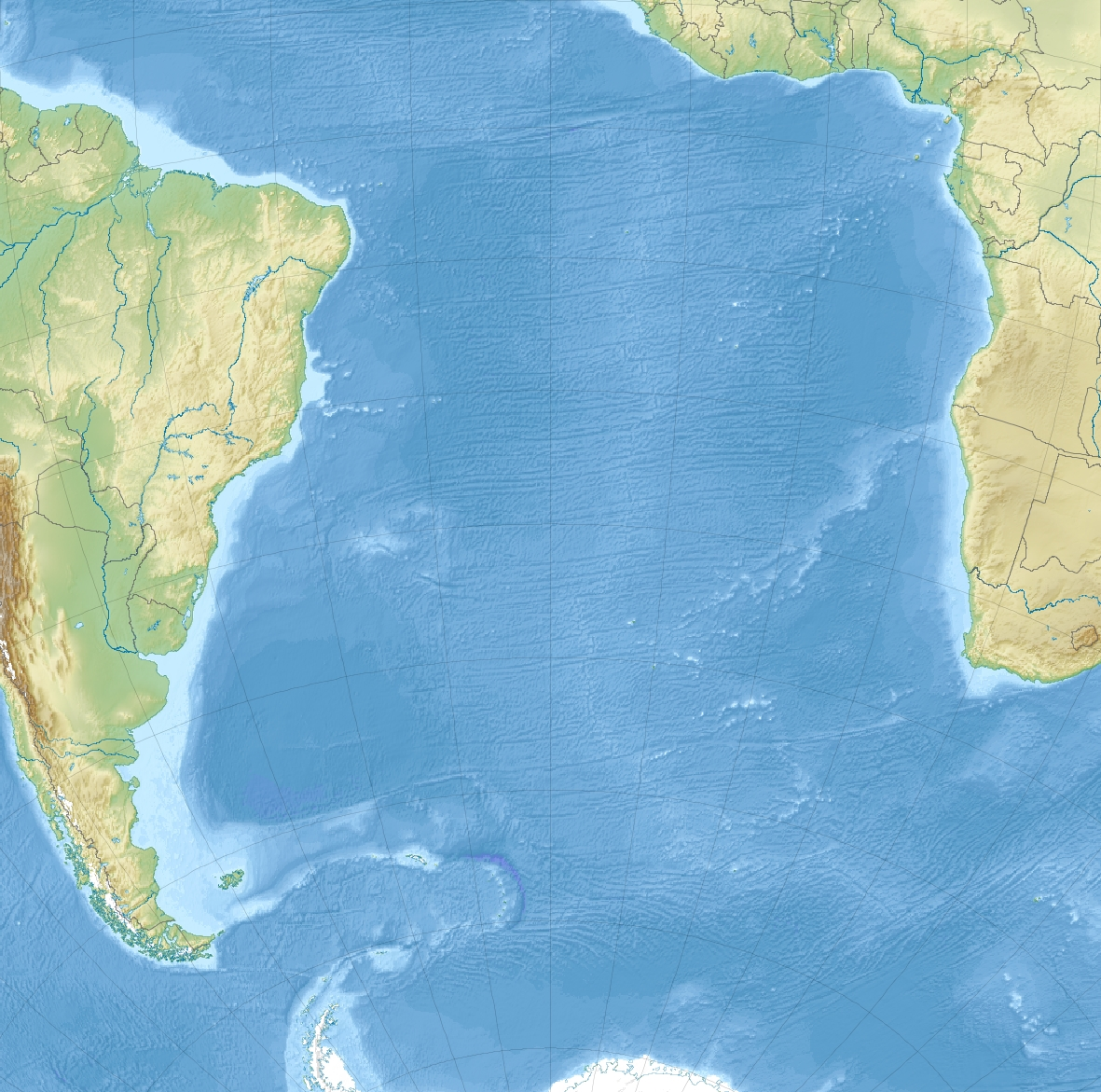
- Location within South Atlantic
- UTC time: 2021-08-12 18:32:52
- 2021-08-12 18:35:17
- ISC event: 621237435
- 620986442
- USGS-ANSS: ComCat
- ComCat
- Local date: August 12, 2021
- Local time: 16:32:52
- 16:35:17
- Duration: 4 minutes
- Magnitude: 7.5 M_{w} 7.8 M_{s}
- 8.1–8.3 M_{w} 7.8 M_{s}
- Depth: 47.2 km (29.3 mi)
- 22.8 km (14.2 mi) (USGS); 20.0 km (12.4 mi) (GCMT); 10.0 km (6.2 mi) (GEOFON)
- Epicenter: 58.416°S 25.321°W
- Type: Either megathrust or Intraplate
- Areas affected: South Georgia and the South Sandwich Islands
- Max. intensity: MMI VII (Very strong)
- Tsunami: Up to 2.46 ft (0.75 m) at South Georgia Island
- Aftershocks: 1,968 M_{w} 4.0+, up to 7.1 M_{w}
- Casualties: None

The 2021 South Sandwich Islands earthquakes were a pair of powerful earthquakes, followed by many strong aftershocks which struck along the South Sandwich Trench in August 2021. The quakes measured 7.5 and 8.1 on the moment magnitude scale, according to the United States Geological Survey. The mainshock is tied with another event in 1929 as the largest earthquake ever recorded in the South Atlantic region, and is tied with the 2021 Kermadec Islands earthquake as the second largest earthquake of 2021.

== Tectonic setting ==
These earthquakes occurred in the Scotia subduction zone, where the South American Plate subducts westward beneath the Scotia Plate and South Sandwich microplate (a component of the broader Scotia plate) at a rate of 71 mm/yr.

The 7.5 M_{w} foreshock was located at a depth of 47 km, placing it within the lower half of the lithosphere of the South American Plate, and it is likely to have been caused by compressional forces due to the downward bending of the plate. The mainshock occurred about 3 minutes later at a depth of approximately 56 km and 90 km to the south. Due to seismic interference from the earlier quake, the mechanism, faulting geometry, and rupture details of the mainshock are not yet fully understood. The focal mechanism solution indicates slip occurred on either a steep fault dipping to the northwest or a shallow plane dipping to the southeast within the lithosphere of the subducting plate.

Over the previous century, eight other M 7+ earthquakes, including the M 7.5 foreshock, occurred within 250 km of the August 2021 M 8.1 earthquake. The largest of these previous earthquakes was a M 7.8 earthquake in May 1964. M 7+ earthquakes in the South Sandwich Island region have historically occurred at intermediate depths (broadly defined as 70–300 km depth). However, the largest earthquake in the region was a shallow (10 km deep) M 8.1 earthquake on June 27 1929 that was located approximately 450 km northwest of the epicentre of the August 2021 M 8.1 earthquake along the northern boundary of the two plates. None of these earthquakes are known to have caused fatalities due to their remote location.

== Earthquakes ==
The first earthquake, measured at magnitude 7.5, struck at 16:32 local time, but did not cause any damage or casualties. The mainshock, which was the much stronger magnitude 8.1, occurred three minutes after the foreshock. A tsunami warning was issued by the Pacific Tsunami Warning Center, but was later cancelled for both events. The Global Centroid Moment Tensor only registered one event measuring M_{w} 8.3 or M_{s} 7.5.

Although the two earthquakes were considered intraslab events occurring within the South American Plate, rather than at the boundary of the two plates, the aftershock distribution suggested a rupture of the plate boundary megathrust as well. Aftershocks, some larger than magnitude 6.0, occurred along a 470-km-long segment of the subduction zone, as well as on the outer-rise, and on a transform fault. Seismic signals from the 8.1 mainshock initially went undetected by seismological agencies across the world, as the signals from the foreshock were still propagating and being detected just as it occurred. Several hours after the magnitude 7.5 quake, the U.S. Geologic Survey revealed that a second, much larger, and "complex" event had taken place three minutes after the occurrence of the 7.5. Current understandings of the quake, the strike and dip of the source fault vary between seismological agencies, with data suggesting a megathrust or intraslab quake. A day later it was revealed that it measured 8.1 on the moment magnitude scale, and that the 7.5 earthquake was a foreshock.

Based on the presence of numerous aftershocks on the subduction zone and outer-rise, the earthquake likely ruptured the megathrust all the way to the trench. The aftershock distribution also suggest a large rupture area for the main event.

=== Characteristics ===
The event was rather unusual due to its duration of 260 seconds; much longer than usual for its moment magnitude. An initial event measuring 7.5 M_{w} occurred at a depth of 47 km, lasting 50 seconds. The 7.5 M_{w} foreshock consisted of two smaller sub-events that initiated along the deeper portion of a thrust fault, but ruptured up-dip.

Shortly afterwards, a 8.16 M_{w} quake ruptured the shallow subduction zone, with a rupture duration of 180 seconds. The first sub-event ruptured 180 km along the subduction zone interface. Two other sub-events measuring 7.6 M_{w} and 7.7 M_{w} occurred 250 km and 300 km south. The 7.6 M_{w} sub-event involved breaking the shallow subduction zone, displaying characteristics of a tsunami earthquake. The larger and shallower mainshock was a slow-rupturing tsunami earthquake that released 70 percent of the seismic moment. The earthquake released seismic energy in the form of long-period energy, where its period was up to 500 seconds. This resulted in smaller body wave and surface-wave magnitudes, at 6.7–7.1 mb and 7.68 M_{s}, respectively. The range of depths from 10 to 70 km by various earthquake agencies are due to the interference of seismic data due to the complexity of the event. Deep thrusting also occurred during the mainshock rupture at depths beyond 50 km.

== Other events ==
The South Sandwich Islands mainshock came just two weeks after a magnitude 8.2 earthquake struck the Alaskan Peninsula and triggered a small tsunami. On March 4, 2021 an 8.1 magnitude earthquake struck New Zealand's Kermadec Islands. This temporal clustering is unusual, since earthquakes of magnitude eight or higher occur only about once per year on average. There is no evidence of a causal relationship between these three events, though 2021 has had the most M8+ earthquakes in one year since 2007.

=== Aftershocks ===
Date	M_{w}	MMI	Source
2021-08-12	7.5	VI	
2021-08-12	8.1	VII	
2021-08-12	6.7	I	
2021-08-12	6.1	IV	
2021-08-12	6.0	IV	
2021-08-13	6.1	IV	
2021-08-16	6.9	IV	
2021-08-17	6.1	IV	
2021-08-18	6.0	IV	
2021-08-22	6.6	IV	
2021-08-22	7.1	IV	
2021-10-04	6.2	IV	
2021-11-01	6.0	IV	
2021-12-03	6.0	III	
2021-12-16	6.0	III	
2021-12-20	6.0	III	
2022-01-25	6.0	III	
2022-03-06	6.0	IV	

In the 24 hours following the mainshock, 61 aftershocks of M 4.5 or larger were detected, including three aftershocks greater than M 6. These aftershocks spanned a distance of approximately 470 km along the South Sandwich Trench, stretching from the location of the M 7.5 foreshock southward to the triple junction between the South American Plate, South Sandwich Plate, and Antarctic Plate.

By August 24, there were approximately 500 aftershocks between magnitudes 4.5 and 5.1, more than 80 aftershocks between magnitudes 5.2 and 6.2, and three aftershocks between magnitudes 6.3 and 6.9. The largest aftershock, measuring 7.1 M_{w}, occurred on August 22 on a shallow normal fault near the outer rise, within the subducting South American Plate. It had an estimated maximum slip of 2 m (6.6 ft), and a very shallow depth of 6 km.

In total there were 1,968 aftershocks as of 11 December 2022.

== Tsunami ==
A tsunami with a maximum run-up height of around 75 cm (2.46 ft) was measured at King Edward Point, South Georgia Island. Tsunami signals were observed as far away as King Cove, Alaska [15 cm (0.49 ft)] and Rodrigues, Mauritius [23 cm (0.75 ft)]. Waves also hit the Portuguese Azores Islands and eastern Madagascar [20 cm (0.66 ft) and 6 cm (0.20 ft)]. It was also the first tsunami to be recorded in four oceans since the 2004 Indian Ocean tsunami.

== See also ==
- List of earthquakes in 2021
- Teletsunami
