= 2021 Kermadec Islands earthquakes =

Earthquakes in New Zealand

- Location within Oceania
- UTC time: 2021-03-04 17:41:25; 2021-03-04 19:28:31
- ISC event: 619918421; 620360228
- USGS-ANSS: ComCat; ComCat
- Local date: March 5, 2021
- Local time: 06:41:25 NZDT; 08:28:31 NZDT
- Magnitude: 7.4 M_{w}; 8.1 M_{w}
- Depth: 43.0 km (27 mi); 28.9 km (18 mi)
- Epicentre: 29.735°S 177.282°W
- Fault: Kermadec-Tonga subduction zone
- Type: Megathrust
- Areas affected: New Zealand; Pacific islands
- Total damage: Limited
- Max. intensity: MMI VIII (Severe)
- Peak acceleration: 0.75 g
- Tsunami: Up to 2.4 m (7.9 ft) in Raoul Island.
- Casualties: Several injured

The 2021 Kermadec Islands earthquakes were a series of earthquakes with magnitudes of 8.1 and 7.4 that occurred at 19:28:31 UTC on 4 March 2021. The epicentres were located southeast of Raoul Island in the Kermadec Islands, part of the New Zealand outlying islands. The main magnitude 8.1 earthquake was preceded by a magnitude 7.4 foreshock and followed by a magnitude 6.1 aftershock. A separate, unrelated magnitude 7.3 earthquake occurred off the coast of the North Island of New Zealand, approximately 900 km to the south, several hours before the main quakes. More than a dozen aftershocks exceeded magnitude 6.

== Tectonic setting ==
The Kermadec-Tonga subduction zone runs east of the Kermadec Islands and marks the boundary between the Australian and Pacific plates. This convergent boundary is where the denser Pacific plate subducts or dives beneath the less dense Australian plate.

== Earthquakes ==
The main magnitude 8.1 megathrust earthquake occurred at 08:28:31 NZDT on 5 March 2021 (19:28:31 UTC, 4 March) along the subduction zone due to reverse faulting. The USGS estimated that the rupture zone was 175 by 75 km (109 by 47 mi) in area. The main shock was preceded by a magnitude 7.4 foreshock less than two hours prior, at 06:41:25 NZDT (17:41:25 UTC).

=== Other events ===
About 6 hours before the main quake, at 02:27:36 NZDT on 5 March (13:27:36 UTC, 4 March) a magnitude 7.3 earthquake struck 100 km (60 mi) off East Cape in the North Island. This earthquake was felt largely across the country, and woke many people up, but no damage was caused. This earthquake was considered an independent event. A tsunami flooding warning was issued due to this quake, which was rescinded before the other quakes hit.

On 28 July 2021, nearly 5 months after the Kermadec Islands mainshock, an 8.2 magnitude earthquake struck the Alaska Peninsula, and another 8.1 magnitude earthquake struck the Sub-Antarctic British territory of the South Sandwich Islands on 12 August of that year. This is unusual since earthquakes of magnitude 8 or higher occur only about once every year on average. There is no evidence of a causal relationship between the three events. 2021 has had the most 8.0+ earthquakes in a single year since 2007.

=== Aftershocks ===
As of 27 January 2023, there have been at least 2,847 aftershocks above 4.0 magnitude, and 13 of them above magnitude 6. A magnitude 7.1 earthquake struck close to Raoul Island on 24 April 2023, over two years after the mainshock. It is currently the largest aftershock of the sequence.

== Impact ==
According to GeoNet, the mainshock caused more than 300 landslides on steep forest cliffs and rugged coastal cliffs on Raoul Island. The largest slide was at Pills Beach, where about 400 metres of coastal cliffs collapsed, leaving a column of sediment in the ocean.

A few buildings were damaged in Raoul Island. However, there were no casualties as the island was uninhabited at the time due to the COVID-19 pandemic.

=== Tsunami ===
The main quake led to tsunami warnings being issued around the Pacific, as far away as Peru, but particularly for the North Island of New Zealand. Thousands of New Zealanders evacuated to higher ground. NEMA said the first waves were due to reach New Zealand at around 9:49 am local time, with flooding expected along areas of the East and West Coasts of the North Island, and issued an evacuation order for areas of Northland, Bay of Plenty, Gisborne, and Great Barrier Island. The tsunami land threat was dropped at 1:27 pm NZDT to a "Beach and Marine threat."

While the tsunami heights were initially predicted to be 1–3 m (3.3–9.8 ft) high, tsunami heights measured by GeoNet ended up being around 0.35–0.40 m (1.1–1.3 ft) at East Cape and around 0.15–0.20 m (0.49–0.66 ft) at Great Barrier Island; 0.64 m (2.1 ft) waves were reported in Norfolk Island. The tsunami heights at Raoul Island from the main earthquake are estimated to have reached 2.4 m (7.9 ft), however, exact heights at the island from the main earthquake were not able to be measured because the earthquake destroyed the island's monitoring equipment. In Port-Vila, Vanuatu, a few boats were damaged and several people were injured.

== See also ==
- List of earthquakes in 2021
- List of earthquakes in New Zealand
- 2004 Tasman Sea earthquake
- 2016 Te Araroa earthquake
- 2016 Kaikōura earthquake
