= 479 BC Potidaea earthquake =

First historically recorded tsunami

Coordinates: 39.7°N 23.3°E

479 BC Potidaea tsunami
- Local date: 479 BC
- Magnitude: 7.0 M_{s}
- Epicenter: North Aegean Sea
- Areas affected: Ancient Greece
- Max. intensity: MMI IX (Violent)
- Tsunami: Yes
- Casualties: Many, possibly at least hundreds of fatalities

The 479 BC Potidaea tsunami is the oldest record of a paleotsunami in human history. The tsunami is believed to have been triggered by a M_{s} 7.0 earthquake in the north Aegean Sea. The associated tsunami may have saved the colony of Potidaea from an invasion by Persians from the Achaemenid Empire.

== Tectonic setting ==
The Aegean Sea is a seismically active region with complex plate tectonics interaction both within and surrounding the Aegean Sea plate. Seismicity in the Aegean Sea is due to active extension within the lithospheric plate.

The Aegean Sea plate is defined along several major plate boundaries including the North Anatolian Fault which runs through northern Turkey, where the Anatolian sub-plate slides past the Eurasian plate along this right-lateral strike-slip fault. The southern margin is dominated by active convergence of the African plate. It converges north towards the Aegean Sea plate at a rate of 5–10 mm/yr. The subduction rate along the Hellenic subduction zone at 35 mm/yr, however, greatly exceeds the velocity of the African plate. North–south extension within the Aegean Sea plate in the back-arc region compensates the subduction rate. Shallow crustal earthquakes within the Aegean Sea plate is a result of this extension, accommodated by east–west trending normal faults.

== Earthquake ==
The M_{s} 7.0 earthquake had an epicenter somewhere in Macedonia. It was given a maximum Mercalli intensity of IX (Violent).

== Tsunami ==
During the Persian siege of the sea town Potidaea, Greece, Herodotus reports how Persian attackers who tried to exploit an unusual retreat of the water were suddenly surprised by "a great flood-tide, higher, as the people of the place say, than any one of the many that had been before". Herodotus attributes the cause of the sudden flood to the wrath of Poseidon. The large tsunami was observed in the Toronean Gulf which devastated Potidaea. The tsunami sank multiple Persian ships attempting to invade the colony, drowning several hundred soldiers. The source of the tsunami is still controversial with its origins attributed to meteorological effects or a submarine landslide. Historical documents did not mention the occurrence of a storm however.

== See also ==
- List of earthquakes in Greece
- List of historical earthquakes
- List of tsunamis
