= Garth tsunami =

Suspected prehistoric tsunami in Scotland

The Garth tsunami is a likely prehistoric tsunami off the Shetland Islands that may have occurred 5,500 years ago (3,500 B.C.). Its origin is unknown; impact events, earthquakes, and submarine landslides similar to the Storegga Slide 8,100 years ago (6,100 B.C.) have been proposed as factors contributing to the event. Evidence suggests a run-up of more than 10 metres (33 ft) in the Shetland Islands. It probably had great impact on coastal communities in the region; mass burials dating approximately to that time in the Shetland and Orkney Islands have been interpreted to host its fatalities.

== Name, chronology and size ==
The tsunami is named after Garth Loch. It likely took place approximately 5,500 years ago and also is known as the "5,500 BP event". It generated a run-up of more than 10 metres (33 ft) in the Shetland Islands. This tsunami is one of three thought to have hit Scotland during the Holocene although the occurrence of this or a later one are considered uncertain.

== Deposits ==
Deposits from the tsunami have been recovered at Garth, South Nesting, in Garth Loch and Loch of Benston and Whale Firth; originally it was discovered at Sullum Voe, Shetland. Further evidence of environmental changes possibly caused by a tsunami 5,500 years ago have been identified at West Voe. Its deposits resemble those created by the tsunamis generated by the Storegga Slide 8,100 years ago. Evidence, later questioned, from this tsunami has also been found in Bergsøy, Norway, the second ocean transgression in southwestern Norway may be the Garth tsunami, and potential traces have been found in coastal lakes of Norway. No evidence of the tsunami has been found in Scotland or the Orkney Islands, which would be shielded by the Shetland Islands from a tsunami that originated at the Norwegian continental slope. Landscape changes in the Orkney Islands that occurred 5,500 years ago may be a consequence either of the tsunami or of a period of increased storm activity at that time.

== Origin ==
The Garth tsunami may have been generated by an earthquake, an underwater landslide, or a meteorite impact. A landslide within the backwall of the Storegga Slide that took place 5,700 years ago and the 900 cubic kilometres (220 cu mi) Trænadjupet slide farther north that took place 4,400 years ago, are candidate landslides, while the Afen landslide in the Faroe–Shetland Channel is probably too small, although it cannot be ruled out.

== Impact on humans ==
There is evidence that the Garth tsunami affected communities in the North Atlantic, resulting in significant death tolls. Approximately 5,000–5,500 years ago chambered cairns were built in the Orkney Islands. While the results from radiocarbon dating are uncertain, they imply that these tombs may have been constructed to hold the bodies of a mass fatality event. It is possible that these tombs were constructed for the victims of the Garth tsunami. Some mass burials at Sumburgh in the Shetland Islands may also be mass graves for tsunami victims. Historically, large tsunamis such as the 2004 Indian Ocean earthquake and tsunami killed thousands of people, leading to the construction of mass graves for the fatalities. The sudden abandonment of a Stone Age settlement at Hamre, Norway 5,500 years ago and the presence of an overwash deposit is also potentially linked to the Garth tsunami. Evidence of any tsunami impact on Norway is considered questionable.
