= Outer trench swell =

Seafloor ridge near an oceanic trench

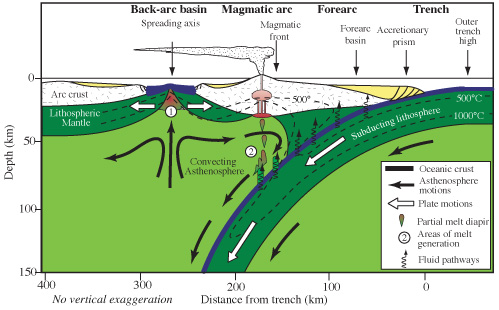

The outer trench swell, outer trench high, or outer rise is a subtle ridge on the seafloor near an oceanic trench, where a descending plate begins to flex and fault in preparation for its descent into the mantle at a subduction zone. The lithosphere is bent upwards by plate stresses, and is not in isostatic equilibrium (distinguish from the "outer ridge" of a forearc).

== Characteristics ==
Typically, the gravity field over the outer swell is about 50 mGal (0.5 mm/s²) higher than expected from isostasy, while gravity over the trench is about 200 mGal (2 mm/s²) less than that expected from isostatic considerations.

The bending of the plate is associated with tension in the upper 20 km, and shallow earthquakes, caused by tensional failure induced by the downward bending of the oceanic plate are common; about 20 extensional outer rise earthquakes with magnitude 5 or greater occur annually. Most tension axes are perpendicular to the trench, independent of the direction of relative motion between the two plates, indicating that failure is controlled by bending stresses in the plate. Plate bending also causes deeper (down to 50 km) earthquakes due to compression.

The wavelength and amplitude of this flexure can be used to constrain the state of stress across the plate boundary. The width of the outer rise is directly related to the flexural rigidity of the lithosphere. The thickness of the elastic lithosphere varies between 20 and 30 km for most trench profiles. Faulting related to plate bending and stair-stepping of the descending slab into the trench may allow seawater to infiltrate deep into the crust and perhaps upper mantle. This may lead to large scale formation of serpentinite in the upper mantle of the downgoing plate (Ranero et al., 2003).

Faulting of the downgoing plate results in a horst and graben structure that allows sediment that reaches the trench to be deposited in graben and carried downward. This faulting also breaks up seamounts as they approach the trench. The principal mechanism of frontal erosion may reflect combined effects of seamount tunneling, mass wasting and transport to the trench, deposition in a graben on the downgoing plate, and descent into the mantle.

Outer trench swells are geoscientific frontiers and much remains to be learned about them. Recent volcanoes have been discovered on ~135-million-year-old Pacific plate east of Japan (Hirano et al., 2006). These small alkalic volcanoes are small percent melts of asthenosphere that exploit bending-related lithospheric faults to reach the seafloor. Hirano et al., (2006) proposed that these small volcanoes erupted along lithospheric fractures in response to plate flexure during subduction. If bending-related faulting and serpentinization is an important process beneath outer trench swells, there are probably also abundant low-temperature hydrothermal vents on the swells, similar to those of the Lost City (hydrothermal field).
