= Storegga Slide =

Prehistoric landslide off Norway

Coordinates: 64°52′N 1°18′E

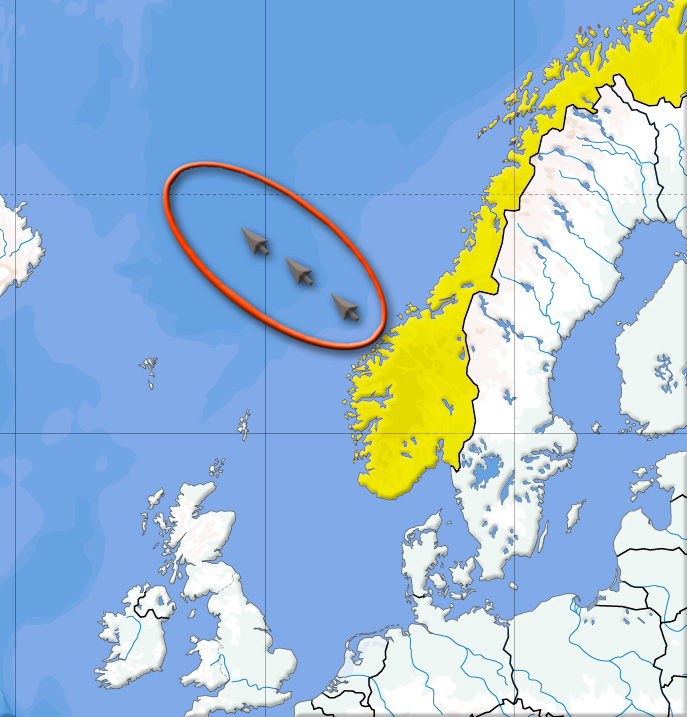
Map of Storegga Slides

The three Storegga Slides (Norwegian: Storeggaraset) are amongst the largest known submarine landslides. They occurred at the edge of Norway's continental shelf in the Norwegian Sea, approximately 6225–6170 BCE. The collapse involved an estimated 290 km (180 mi) length of coastal shelf, with a total volume of 3,500 km^{3} (840 cu mi) of debris, which caused a paleotsunami in the North Atlantic Ocean.

== Description ==
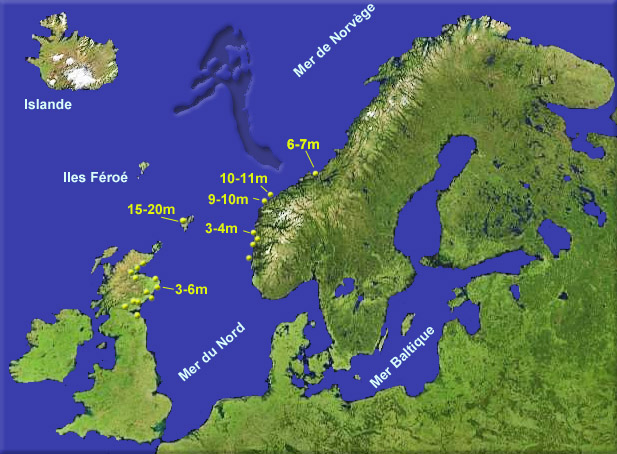
The yellow numbers give the height of the tsunami wave as indicated by tsunamites studied by researchers.

Storegga (Norwegian: 'Great Edge') is located at the edge of Norway's continental shelf in the Norwegian Sea, 100 km (62 mi) north-west of the Møre coast. In around 6200 BCE, structural failures of the shelf caused three underwater landslides, which triggered very large tsunamis in the North Atlantic Ocean.

Based on carbon dating of plant material recovered from sediment deposited by the tsunamis, the latest incident occurred around 6225–6170 BCE. In Scotland, traces of the subsequent tsunami have been recorded, with deposited sediment being discovered in Montrose Basin and the Firth of Forth up to 29 km (18 mi) inland and 4 m (13 ft) above current normal tide levels.

== Possible mechanism ==
The triggering mechanism is thought to have been an earthquake that induced a catastrophic expansion of methane clathrate, a solid compound consisting of large amounts of methane suspended within a crystal water structure that forms in deep oceans under extremely high pressure. If removed from a high-pressure, low-temperature environment, one cubic metre of solid methane clathrate expands to 164 cubic metres of gaseous methane. If such an expansion occurred, it may have weakened the integrity of the surrounding rock sufficiently to trigger the slide.

A second theory states that over time, streams from melting glaciers had carried trillions of tons of sediment to the edge of the continental shelf, where it accumulated in many layers. In this case, a trigger such as an earthquake could have caused a large area of seafloor to collapse into the deep Norwegian sea, thus carrying the enormous volume of accumulated sediment along with it.

== Impact on human populations ==
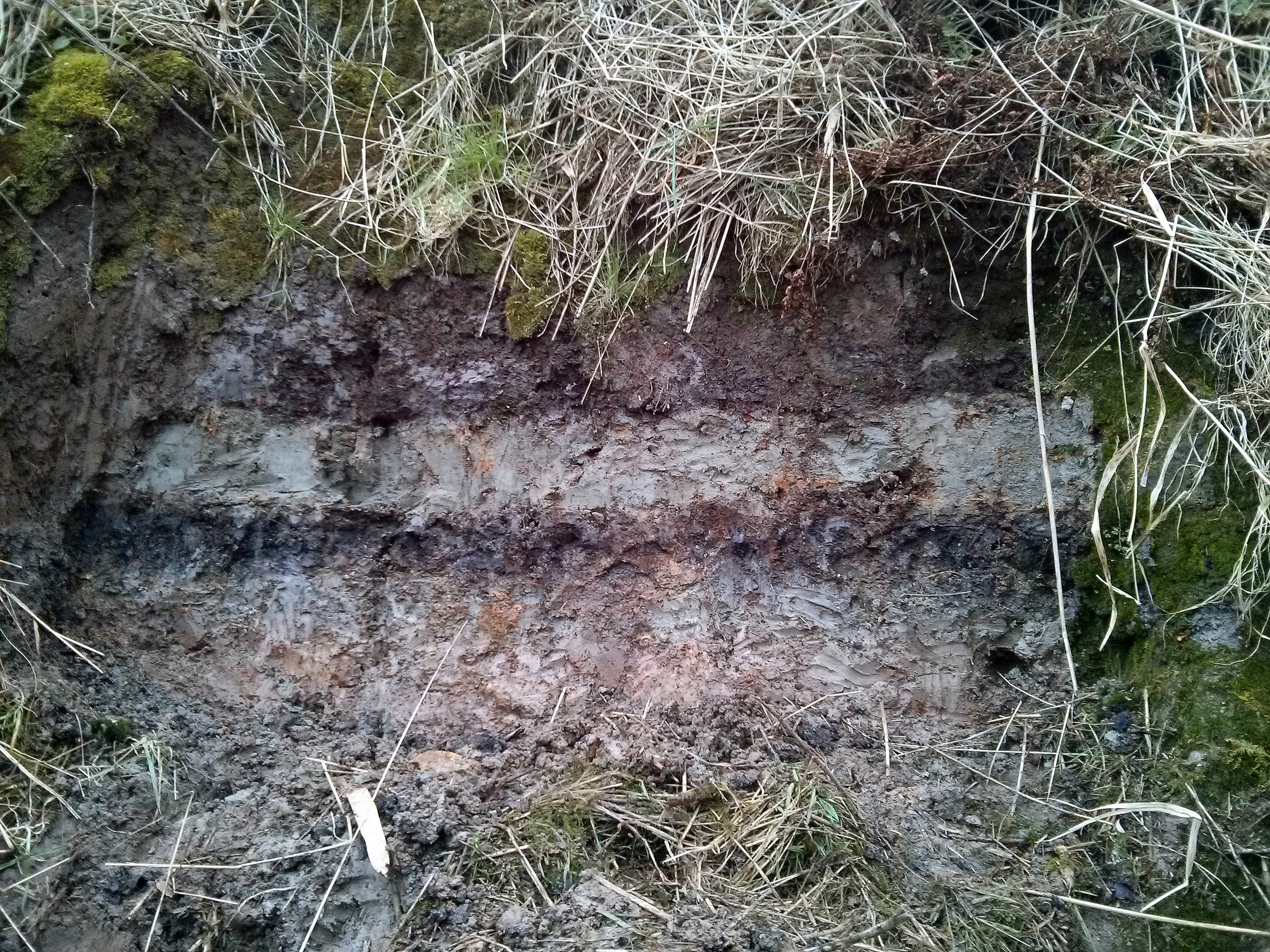
Storegga tsunami deposits (grey upper layer), bracketed by peat (dark brown layers), taken at Maryton on the Montrose Basin, Scotland

At, or shortly before, the time of the Second Storegga Slide, a land bridge known to archaeologists and geologists as Doggerland linked Britain, Denmark and the Netherlands across what is now the southern North Sea. This area is believed to have included a coastline of lagoons, marshes, mudflats and beaches, and to have been a rich hunting, fowling and fishing ground populated by Mesolithic human cultures.

Although Doggerland was permanently submerged through a gradual rise in sea level, it has been hypothesized that coastal areas of both Britain and mainland Europe, extending over areas which are now submerged, would have been temporarily inundated by a tsunami triggered by the Storegga Slide. This event would have had a catastrophic impact on the Mesolithic population at the time. It is estimated that up to a quarter of the Mesolithic population of Britain was killed.

A 2021 study found that about 600 km (370 miles) of Scotland's northern and eastern coastline were affected, with water encroaching 29 km (18 miles) inland. With present-day populations and sea levels, a similar event today could devastate and destroy seafront and port areas of Arbroath, Stonehaven, Aberdeen, Inverness, Wick, and Montrose.

While the tsunami caused by the Second Storegga Slide would have been devastating for those within the run-in zone, ultimately the tsunami was neither universally catastrophic nor the reason behind the inundation of the last vestiges of Doggerland.

== Future slides ==
Storegga has been thoroughly investigated as part of the preparation activities for the Ormen Lange gas field off the coast of Norway. The prevalent conclusion is that the slide was caused by glacial deposits left behind after the previous glacial period, making any recurrence only possible following a new glaciation. After facts and arguments supporting this conclusion were published in 2004, the development of the Ormen Lange gas field was considered unlikely to increase the risk of triggering a new slide.

== See also ==
- Arctic methane emissions
- Tsunamis affecting the British Isles
- Prehistoric submarine landslides
