= Mount Leeper =

Mountain in Alaska, United States

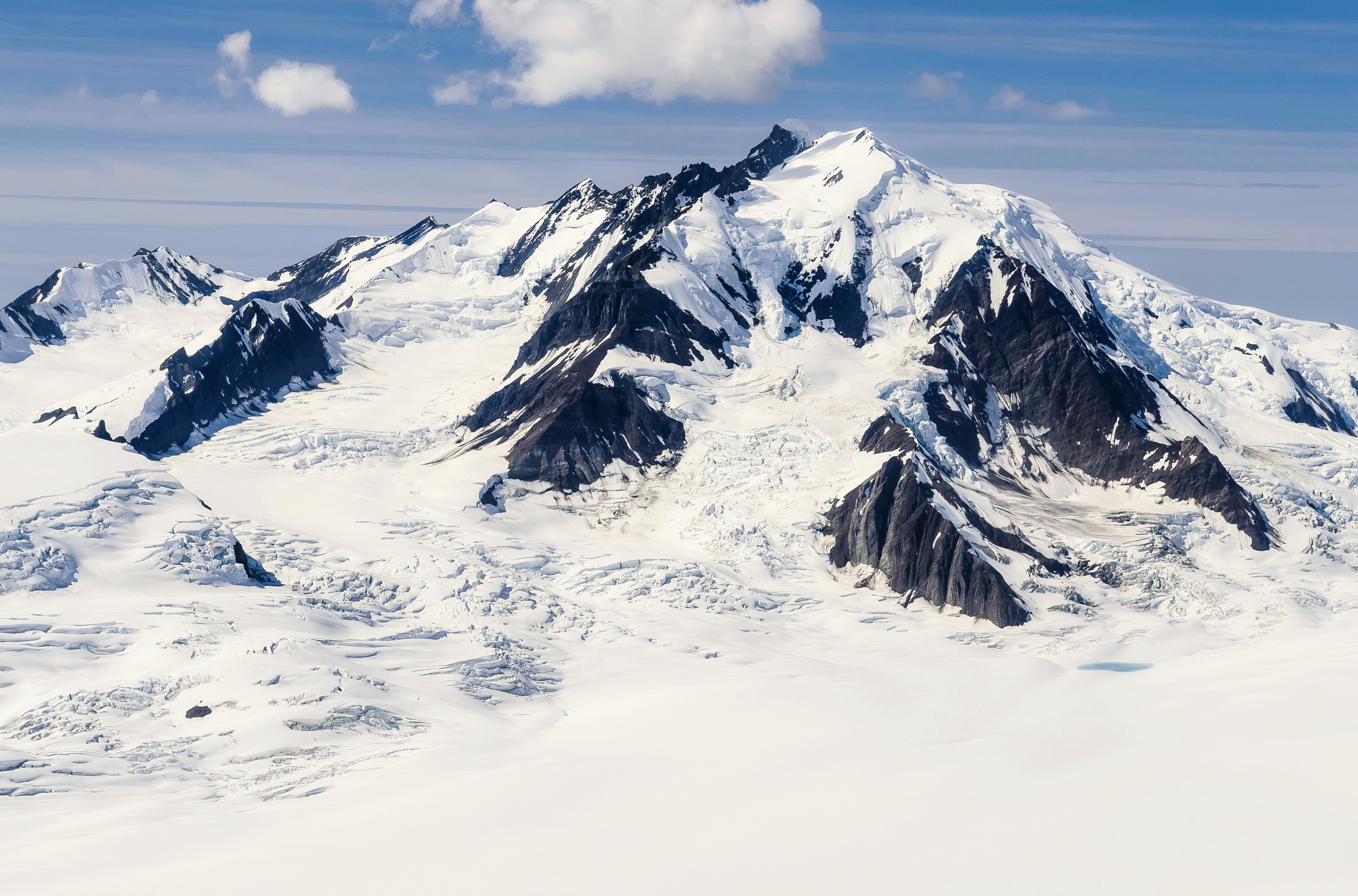
- Northeast aspect

Highest point
- Elevation: 9,603 ft (2,927 m)
- Prominence: 4,653 ft (1,418 m)
- Parent peak: Mount Miller (10,700 ft)
- Isolation: 13.83 mi (22.26 km)
- Coordinates: 60°17′10″N 142°06′13″W

Geography
- Location within Alaska
- Interactive map of Mount Leeper
- Country: United States
- State: Alaska
- Borough: Yakutat
- Protected area: Wrangell–St. Elias National Park
- Parent range: Chugach Mountains; Robinson Mountains
- Topo map: USGS Bering Glacier B-3

Climbing
- First ascent: 1998

Mount Leeper is a 9,603-foot-elevation (2,927-meter) mountain summit in Alaska, United States.

== Description ==
Mount Leeper is the highest point in the Robinson Mountains which are a small subrange of the Chugach Mountains. The prominent, highly glaciated peak is located 98 miles (158 km) northwest of Yakutat, Alaska, in Wrangell–St. Elias National Park and Preserve. The mountain is surrounded by the Leeper Glacier, Guyot Glacier, Yahtse Glacier, and smaller unnamed glaciers. Precipitation runoff and glacial meltwater from the mountain flows to the Gulf of Alaska 17 miles (27 km) to the south. Topographic relief is significant as the summit rises 4,600 feet (1,400 m) above the head of Leeper Glacier in one mile (1.6 km).

== History ==
The mountain's local name was reported in 1943 by the Alaska Road Commission, but the namesake is unknown. The mountain's toponym has been officially adopted by the U.S. Board on Geographic Names. The Robinson Mountains were named by Israel Russell in 1891 in remembrance of Leonidas I. Robinson who perished in nearby Icy Bay that year when his boat capsized in treacherous surf.

The first ascent of the summit was made on May 15, 1998, by Danny W. Kost and Art Weiner via the northwest ridge.

On August 27, 2023, a small plane crashed at Mount Leeper which ended with two fatalities.

== Climate ==
Based on the Köppen climate classification, Mount Leeper is located in a tundra climate zone with long, cold, snowy winters, and cool summers. Weather systems coming off the Gulf of Alaska are forced upwards by the Chugach Mountains (orographic lift), causing heavy precipitation in the form of rainfall and snowfall. Winter temperatures can drop below −10 °F with wind chill factors below −20 °F. This climate supports several glaciers surrounding this peak and the Bagley Icefield approximately 15 miles (24 km) to the north. The months May through June offer the most favorable weather for viewing or climbing.

== See also ==
- List of mountain peaks of Alaska
- Geology of Alaska
