= Tyndall Glacier (Alaska) =

Glacier

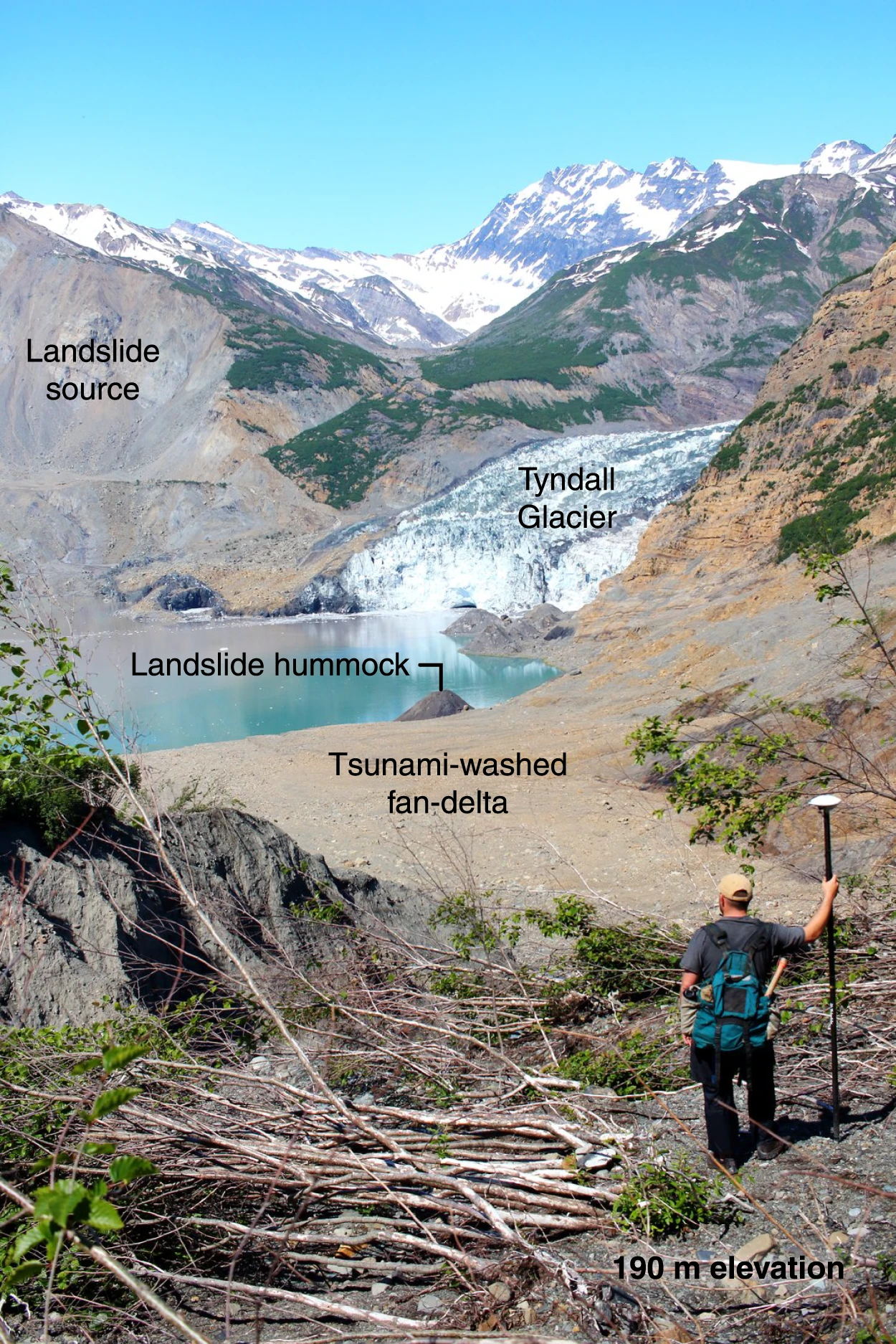
- The terminus of Tyndall Glacier in Taan Fjord/Icy Bay, viewed after the 2015 landslide/tsunami

- Location within Alaska
- Type: Valley glacier/Tidewater glacier
- Location: Alaska
- Coordinates: 60°11′46.17″N 141°8′35.69″W
- Length: 19 km (12 mi)
- Terminus: Taan Fjord
- Status: Receding

Tyndall Glacier is a valley/tidewater glacier in the U.S. state of Alaska. The glacier lies immediately west of 141° West longitude, within the boundaries of the Wrangell–Saint Elias Wilderness, itself part of Wrangell–St. Elias National Park & Preserve, in the borough of Yakutat, Alaska.

Named for John Tyndall (a 19th-century Irish physicist, natural philosopher, and glaciologist), Tyndall Glacier originates in the basin formed by the southwestern face of Mount Saint Elias (the second-tallest mountain in the United States and the fourth-tallest in North America), as well as Mount Huxley, The Hump, and Haydon Peak in the Saint Elias Mountains. From there it extends 19 kilometers, trending southwest and terminating in Taan Fjord, an arm of Icy Bay. Together with the Yahtse and Guyot glaciers, it once occupied the entirety of Icy Bay; as the glaciers have retreated the bay has opened up.

Tyndall Glacier is sometimes used as a landing area for bush planes by parties seeking to climb Mount Saint Elias, as it was during the first winter ascent of the peak.

== History ==
Tyndall Glacier first started to advance out of Taan Fjord around AD 1400, and reached its Little Ice Age maximum length at the mouth of Icy Bay at some point prior to 1794, when George Vancouver mapped the ice extending out from Icy Bay. Tyndall Glacier then began to retreat in 1905. Between 1938 and 1961, Tyndall Glacier's terminus—where the glacier ends and calves into the fjord—retreated approximately 3 kilometres (1.9 mi), until it separated from Guyot Glacier in Icy Bay around 1961.

After that, the Tyndall Glacier then retreated approximately another 10.5 mi (16.9 km) between 1961 and 1991. According to a 2006 study, in the previous 40 years the glacier lost approximately half of its 1961 volume (equivalent to 3.19 × 10^{10} m^{3}) and the glacier's thickness decreased by over 300 meters at its terminus. Since 1991, the glacier's retreat has stabilized, with a terminus at a "shallow bedrock constriction at the head of the fjord," called Hoof Hill.

Mountaineer and explorer Bradford Washburn noted in 1992 that the glacier's retreat has meant that the summit of Mount Saint Elias is only twelve miles from tidewater, exacerbating the peak's immense vertical relief.

=== 2015 landslide and megatsunami ===
Tyndall Glacier and Icy Bay are notable for being the site of an enormous landslide and subsequent megatsunami in 2015.

== Gallery ==
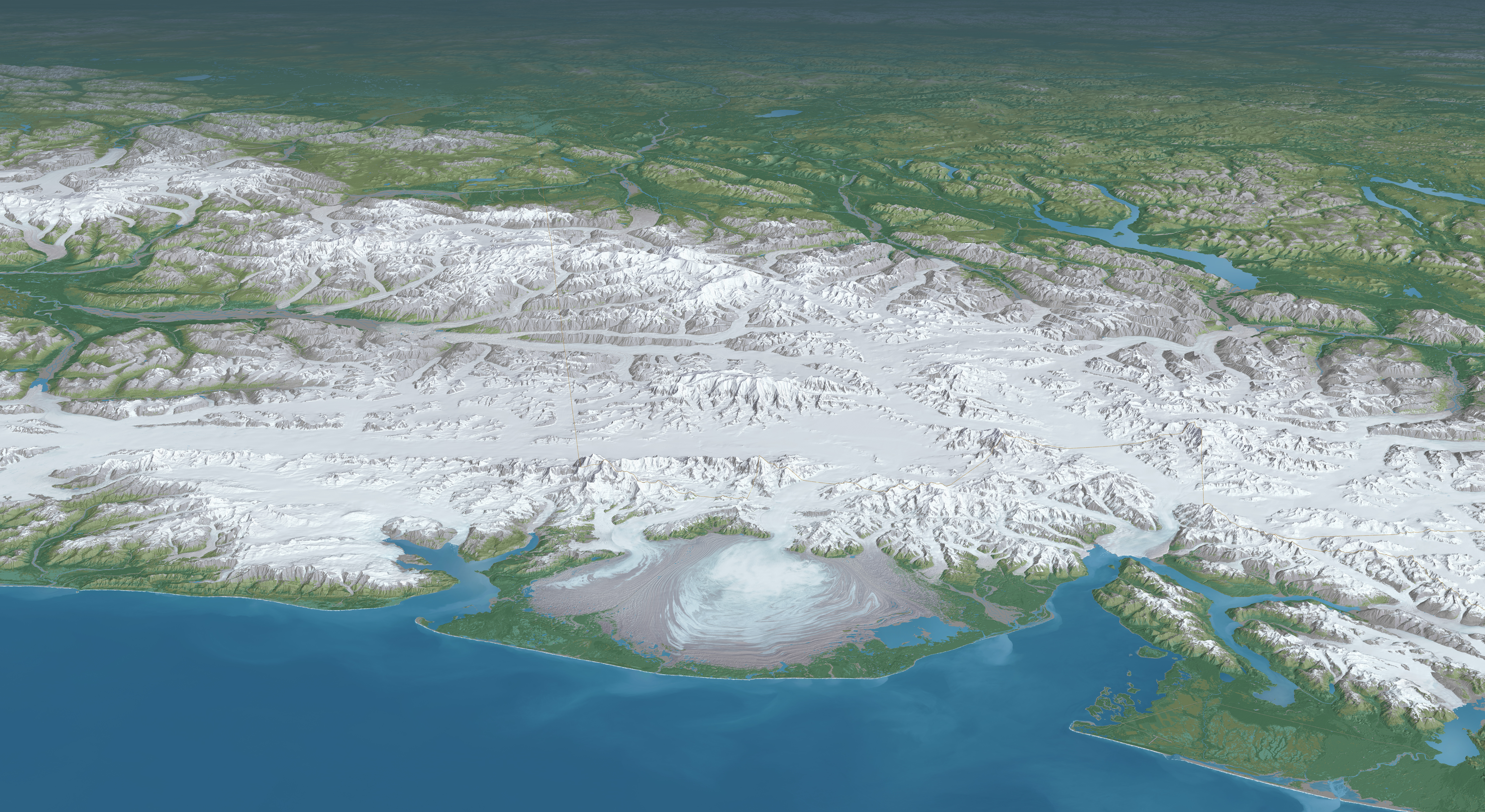
A 3D-rendered panorama of the Saint Elias Mountains. Tyndall Glacier and Icy Bay are located to the left of Malaspina Glacier in the bottom center.

== See also ==
- Malaspina Glacier (a nearby piedmont glacier and the largest such in the world)
- List of glaciers
  - List of glaciers in the United States
