= Mount Huxley (Alaska) =

Mountain in Alaska

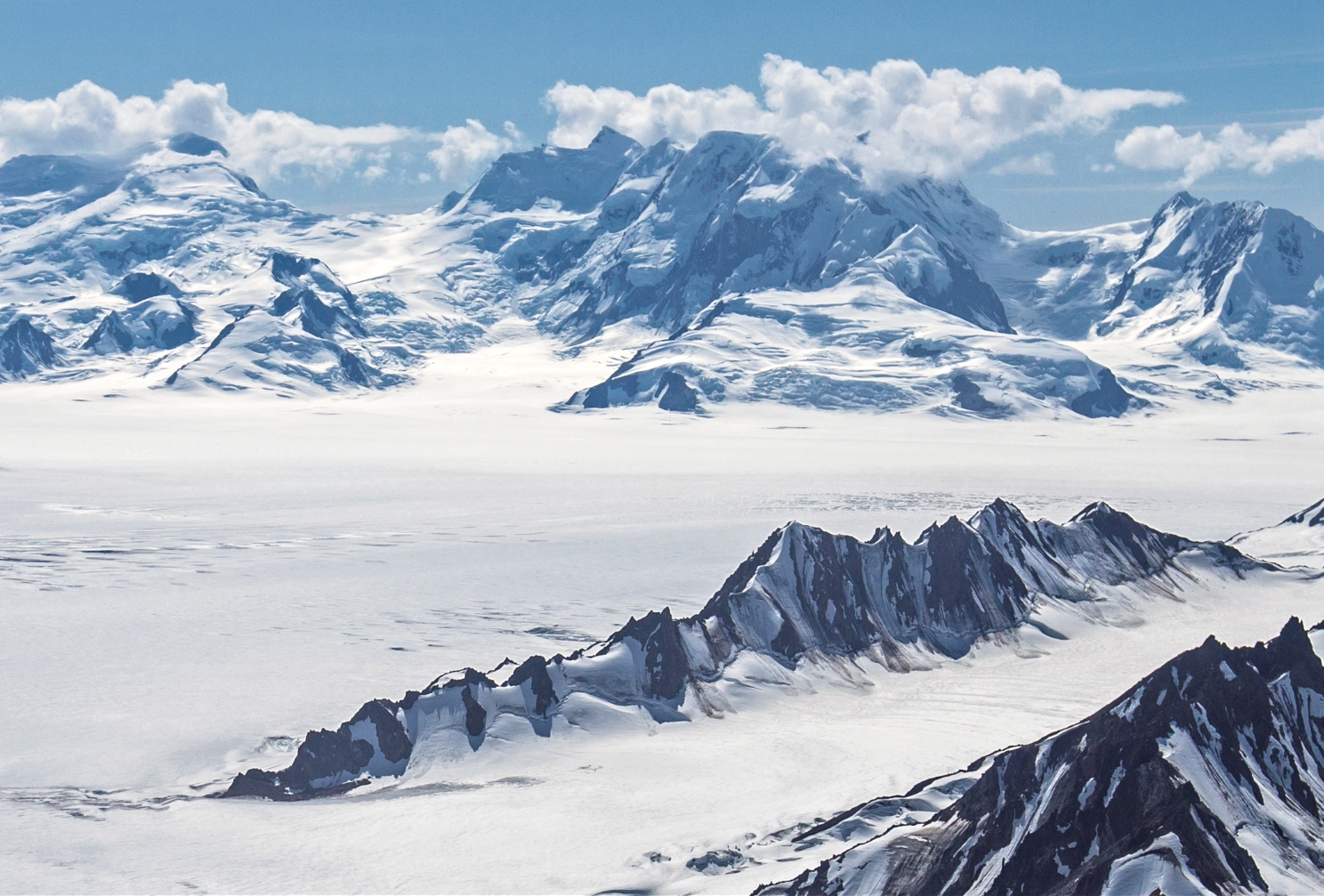
- Aerial view looking south with Huxley centered in the distance

Highest point
- Elevation: 12,216 ft (3,723 m)
- Prominence: 2,016 ft (614 m)
- Parent peak: Mount Saint Elias
- Isolation: 2.56 mi (4.12 km)
- Coordinates: 60°19′40″N 141°09′19″W

Geography
- Location within Alaska
- Interactive map of Mount Huxley
- Location: Wrangell-St. Elias National Park; Yakutat Borough; Alaska, United States
- Parent range: Saint Elias Mountains
- Topo map: USGS Bering Glacier B-1

Climbing
- First ascent: June 9, 1996 by Paul Claus
- Easiest route: Mountaineering expedition

Mount Huxley is a 12,216-foot (3,723 meter) glaciated mountain summit located in the Saint Elias Mountains of Wrangell-St. Elias National Park and Preserve, in the U.S. state of Alaska. The remote peak is situated 75 mi (121 km) northwest of Yakutat, and 8.7 mi (14 km) west-northwest of Mount Saint Elias. The peak rises above the Columbus Glacier and Bagley Icefield to its north, the Tyndall Glacier to the south, and the Yahtse Glacier to the west. Precipitation runoff from the mountain drains into the Gulf of Alaska. The mountain was named in 1886 by English mountaineer Harold Ward Topham for Thomas Henry Huxley (1825-1895), an English biologist. The mountain was officially named Huxley Peak in 1917, but the name was officially changed to Mount Huxley in 1968 by the U.S. Board on Geographic Names. The first ascent of the peak was made June 9, 1996 by Paul Claus who landed his plane at 11,500 feet elevation on the western flank (700 vertical feet below the summit) and climbed the remaining distance to the summit. The second ascent of Mt. Huxley, and first complete ascent from base to summit, was made in June 2018 by Scott Peters, Andrew Peter, and Ben Iwrey starting from the Columbus Glacier.

== Climate ==
Based on the Köppen climate classification, Mount Huxley is located in a subarctic climate zone with long, cold, snowy winters, and cool summers. Weather systems coming off the Gulf of Alaska are forced upwards by the Saint Elias Mountains (orographic lift), causing heavy precipitation in the form of rainfall and snowfall. Temperatures can drop below −20 °C with wind chill factors below −30 °C. The months May through June offer the most favorable weather for viewing and climbing this mountain.

== Gallery ==
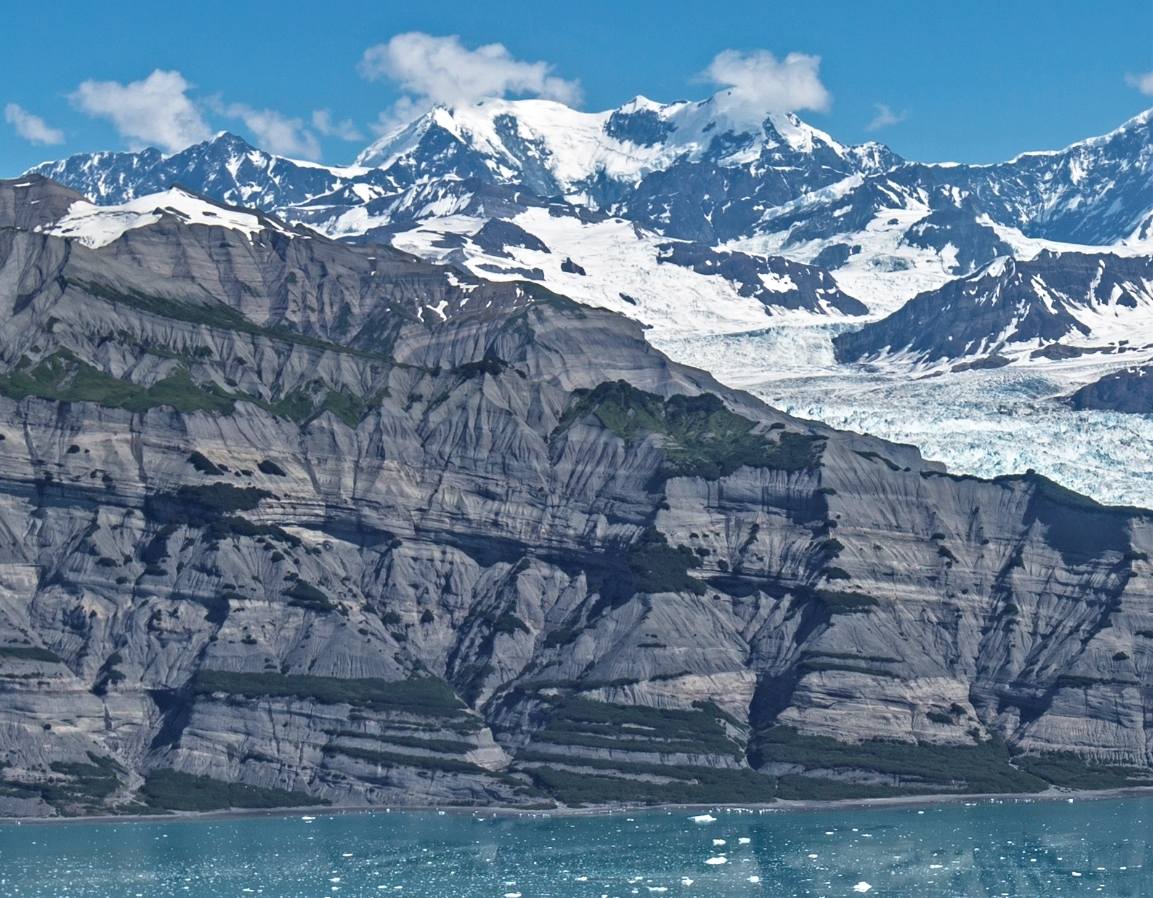
Mount Huxley below clouds

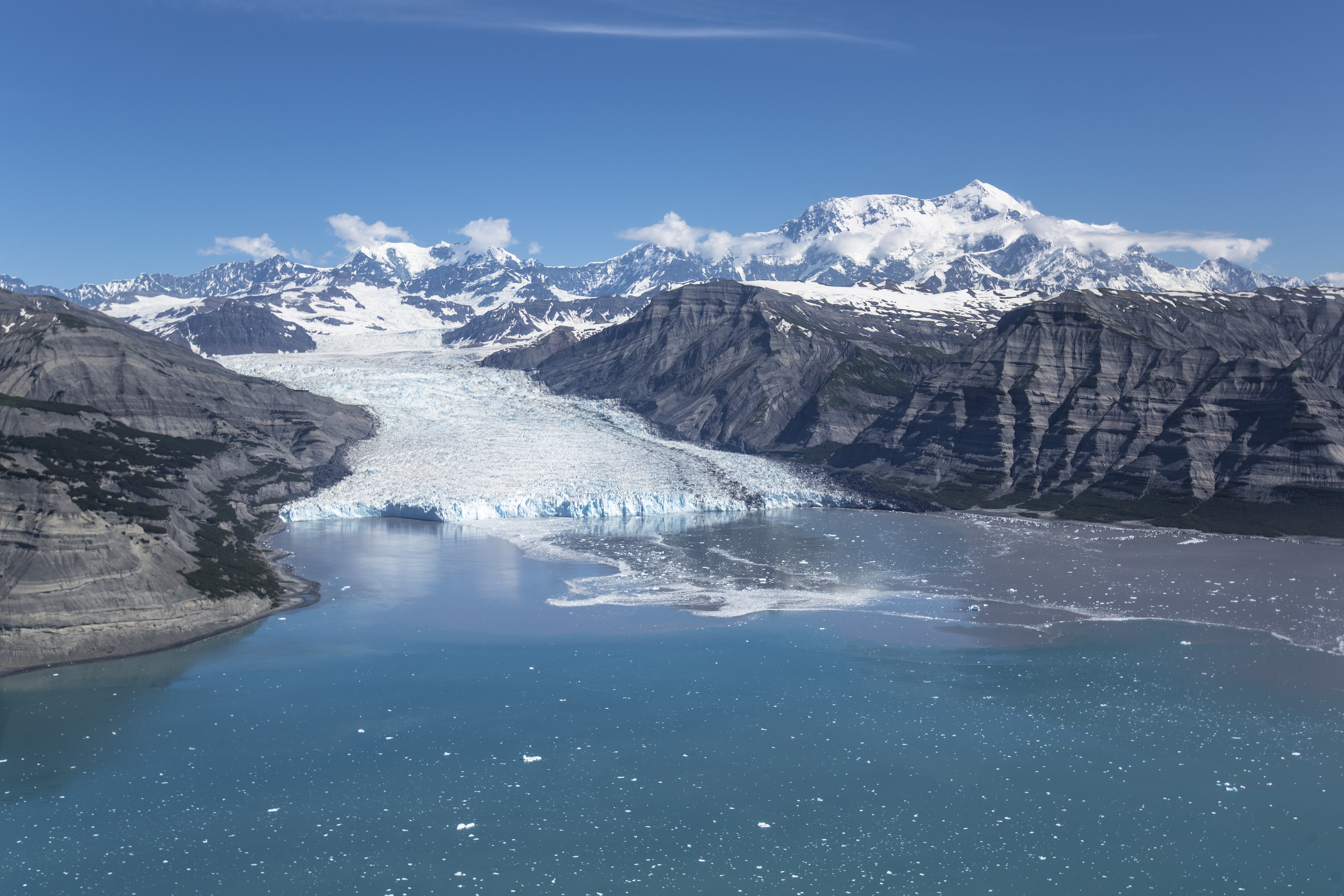
Looking north from Icy Bay to Mount Huxley above Yahtse Glacier, and Mount St. Elias to right

== See also ==
- List of the highest major summits of the United States (Mt. Huxley 165th)
- List of mountain peaks of Alaska
- Geography of Alaska
