= Tana River (Alaska) =

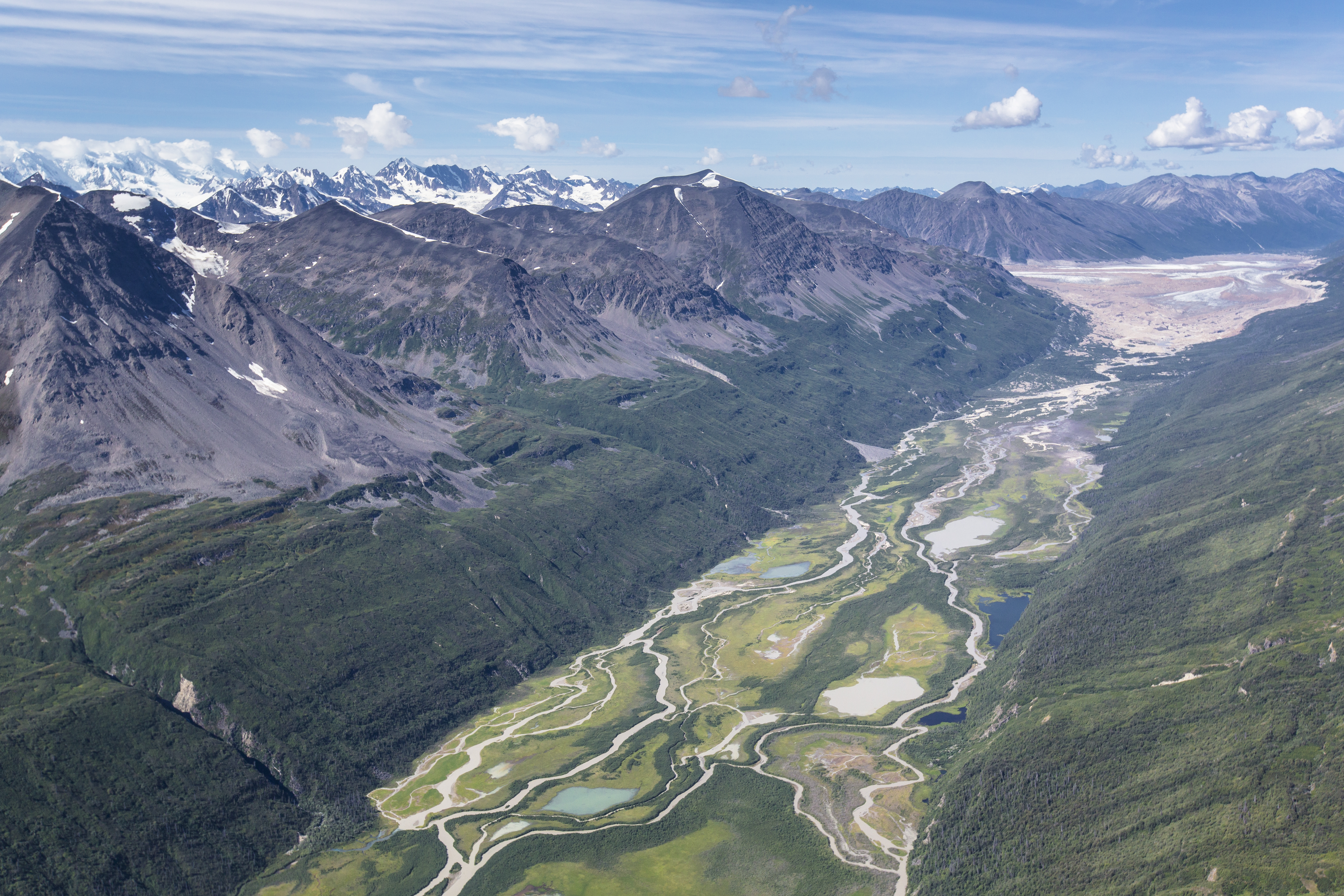
- West Fork of the Tana River

- Location of the mouth of the Tana River in Alaska

Location
- Country: United States
- State: Alaska
- Census Area: Copper River

Physical characteristics
- Source: Bagley Icefield
  - location: Tana Glacier, Wrangell–St. Elias National Park and Preserve
  - coordinates: 60°53′59″N 143°09′49″W
- Mouth: Chitina River
  - location: Chugach Mountains
  - coordinates: 61°12′43″N 142°50′09″W

Tana River is a left tributary of the Chitina River in south-central Alaska. Tana River is fed by the Tana Glacier. It flows initially along its eastern edge, later below its glacier tongue in a predominantly northern direction. The West Fork River flows left into the river. The river valley of the Tana River forms the dividing line between the Saint Elias Mountains in the east and the Chugach Mountains in the west. The Tana River finally flows into the Chitina River after 60 km.

== West Fork Tana River ==
The West Fork Tana River is a left tributary of the Tana River. It is fed by the Tana Glacier tongue of the Bremner Glacier. The West Fork Tana River flows in an easterly direction and flows into the Tana River after 24 km.

== See also ==
- List of rivers of Alaska
- Wrangell–St. Elias National Park and Preserve
