= Mount Miller =

Mountain in Alaska, United States

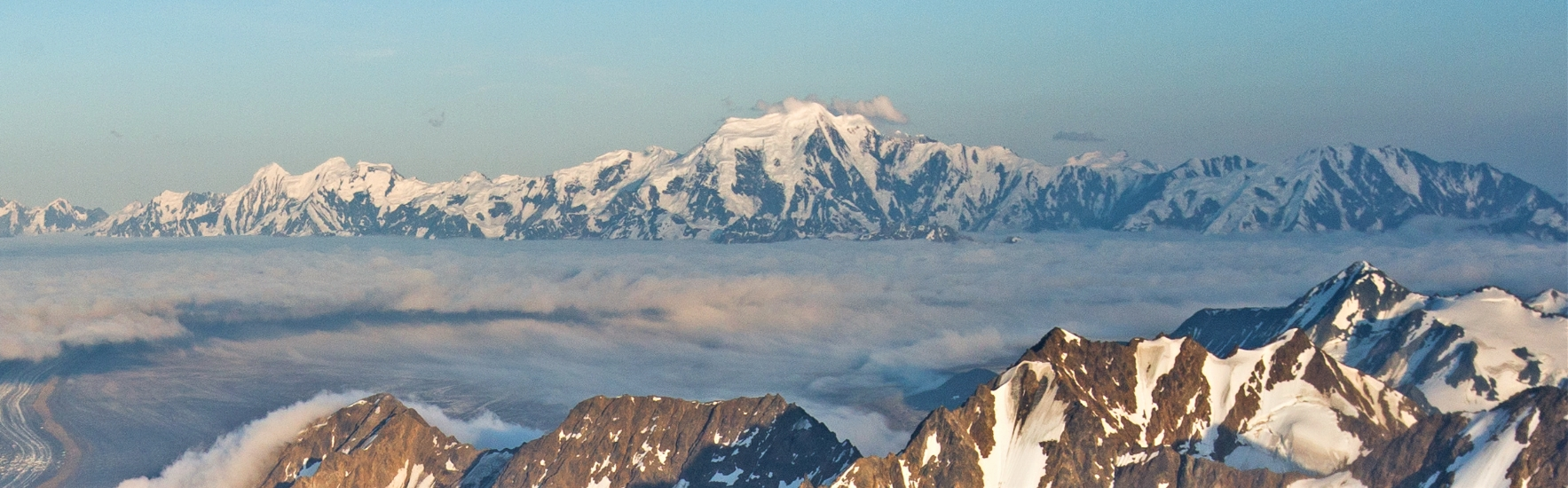
- Mount Miller centered in the distance

Highest point
- Elevation: 10,700+ ft (3261+ m) NGVD 29
- Prominence: 5,200 ft (1,600 m)
- Listing: US most prominent peaks 104th
- Coordinates: 60°27′38″N 142°18′04″W

Geography
- Location within Alaska
- Interactive map of Mount Miller
- Location: Yakutat City and Borough, Alaska, U.S.
- Parent range: Saint Elias Mountains

Climbing
- First ascent: 1996 by C Sassara, R Homberger, R Ruesh, P Claus, C Buhler

Mount Miller is an isolated peak of the Saint Elias Mountains in Alaska, United States. It is notable for its position among spectacular icefields, its distance from any inhabited place, and its large rise above local terrain. It is over 65 miles (105 km) from McCarthy, the nearest habitation, and over 105 miles (169 km) away from Yakutat, the nearest significant town. Exemplifying the size of the mountain, the south flank rises 9,000 feet (2,700 m) above the Duktoth River valley to the south in approximately 9 horizontal miles (14 km).

Mount Miller is the high point of the east–west trending Barkley Ridge, located on the south side of the Bagley Icefield, one of the largest icefields in North America. The Bering Glacier flows from the Bagley Icefield at the western end of the ridge, while the southeast slopes of the ridge head the Yahtse Glacier. The only side of the ridge that is not completely glaciated is the south side, where the Robinson Mountains lie between Barkley Ridge and the Gulf of Alaska.

Since Mount Miller is so isolated, and is not of extraordinary absolute elevation by Alaskan standards, it was not climbed until very recently. The first ascent of the peak was made in April 1996 by Charlie Sassara, Ruedi Homberger, Reto Ruesh, Paul Claus, and Carlos Buhler, via the West Ridge (as published in the 1997 AAJ, link below). Paul Claus, a renowned bush pilot and owner of Ultimate Thule Lodge, a private inholding deep in Wrangell St. Elias Park, as well as a mountaineer had attempted Miller on prior occasions. This included at least one attempt where their camp had to be abandoned on Miller's West Ridge due to the immense snowfall/wind storms produced on the mountain coming in from the Gulf of Alaska. In early 1996, Minot Maser, a former guide with St. Elias Alpine Guides, along with Charlie Wolf were awarded a Mugs Stump Grant to attempt Miller, yet, via the north face. Paul spotted the publishing of the Grant recipients in Climbing Magazine, and, naturally wanted to make the 1st ascent of Miller given his previous efforts. Maser and Wolf's substitute (Andreas Schmidt), landed on the Bagley Icefield below Miller's north face in May 1996. The face proved to be highly exposed to serac and cornice fall. Multiple attempts were made up spurs to the west of the direct north face. These, if successful, would have placed the team much closer to the summit than the month prior's first ascent by Sassara, Homberger, Ruesh, and Claus, which traversed the west ridge from approximately 3 1/2 miles out.

The first ascent team had alternatively flown to Miller's south side; thus, ascended to the west ridge from this approach. Maser and Schmidt ended up abandoning their attempt, given the objective hazards encountered by either seracs or cornices on each spur attempt. Thereafter, they skied further east down the Bagley Ice Field, and, made the 1st ascent of Peak 8,710' just west of Miller. Paul Claus, with whom Maser is friends, picked Maser and Schmidt up in Ultima Thule's Dehavilland Beaver off the north side of the Bagley Icefield. During this flight, Paul shared the tragic news of the 1996 Mt. Everest catastrophe that had just occurred in which 8 climbers died, including Scott Fischer, whom Schmidt was going to guide for that coming season.

A subsequent successful ascent of Miller's north face has been done, which Paul Claus could verify. To the contributor's recollection (Maser) it was climbed and skied(!) by staff who worked at Ultima Thule.

== Gallery ==
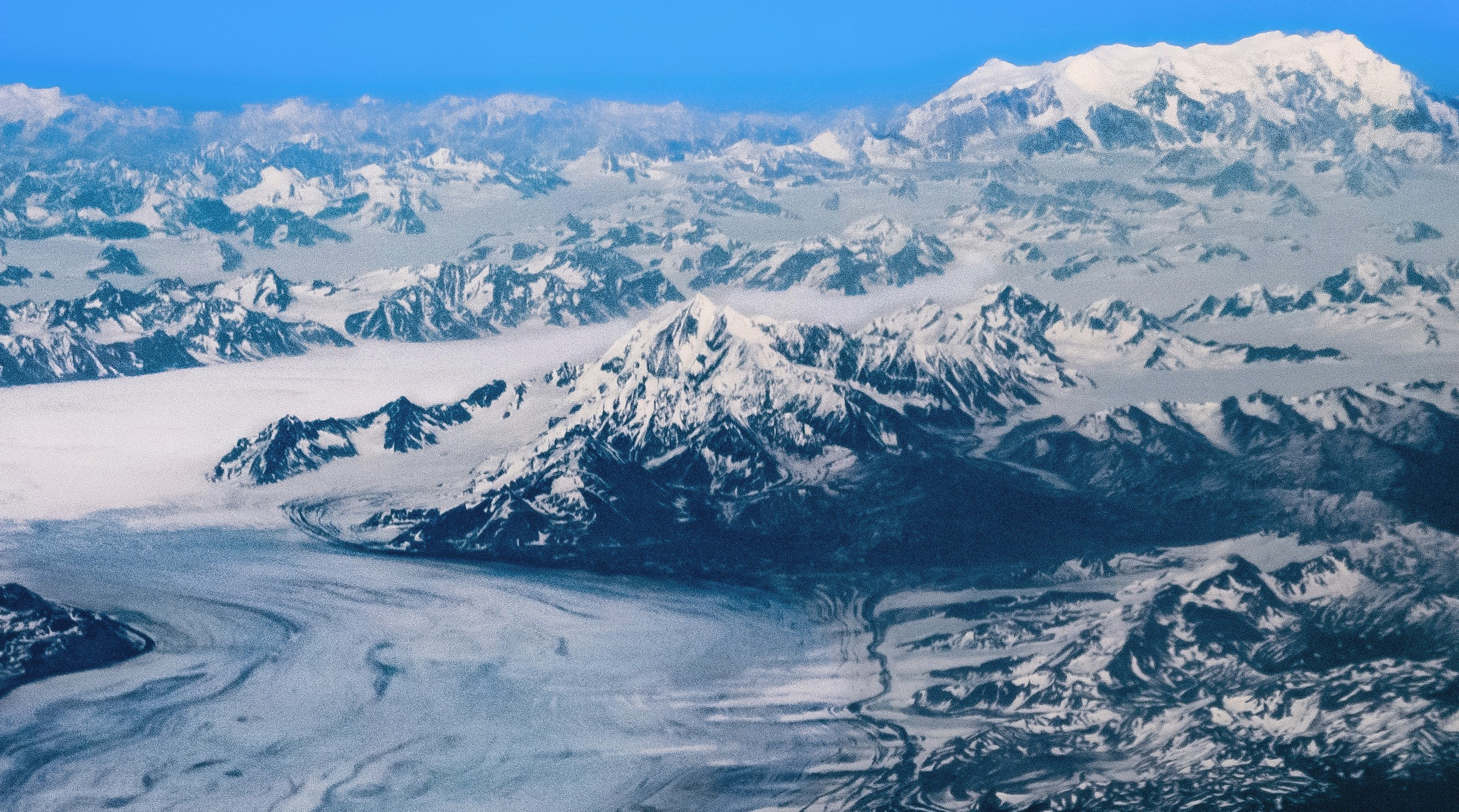
West aspect of Mount Miller centered

== See also ==
- List of mountain peaks of North America
  - List of mountain peaks of the United States
    - List of mountain peaks of Alaska
- List of Ultras of the United States
