= Leonidas Robinson =

Leonidas Robinson may refer to:

- Leonidas D. Robinson, former US Congressman
- Leonidas I. Robinson, 3LT in the USRCS, died in action
