= Seiki Kayamori =

Japanese photographer

- Born: Seiki Kayamori; 9 June 1877; Denbo Mura, Japan
- Died: 9 December 1941 (aged 64); Yakutat, Alaska
- Other name: Shoki Kayamori
- Known for: Photography

Seiki Kayamori (9 June 1877 – 9 December 1941) was a Japanese photographer who lived in Yakutat, Alaska, before World War II. His photographs captured the village's residents, mostly Tlingit Indians, at a time when the fish canning industry and other outside influences were beginning to change or eclipse traditional ways of life.

Kayamori lived in Yakutat for some 30 years and never returned to Japan. But even before Pearl Harbor was bombed, the U.S. Federal Bureau of Investigation suspected him and other Japanese immigrants on the West Coast of spying. Two days after the attack, awaiting his arrest, Kayamori committed suicide. No credible evidence has ever been produced to indicate that he was a spy. Today, about 700 of Kayamori's photographs are housed at the Alaska State Historical Library in Juneau.

== Early life in Japan ==
Kayamori was born in 1877 in what was then the village of Dembo, today part of Fuji City in central Japan. He was the fifth of eight children; the second of four sons. The wealthy and prominent Kayamori family owned a paper mill, farm lands and a small department store.

Under Japan's conscription law, Kayamori likely served a three-year military term. The law also required an additional three-year term in the reserves. In 1903, Japan was on the brink of war with Russia, and reservists like Kayamori waited to be recalled up to duty.

== Life and death in Alaska ==
In September 1903, Kayamori turned 26 aboard the steamer Iyo Maru during the voyage from Yokohama to Seattle. He arrived with $87.10 and a steamer ticket for San Francisco, according to the ship's manifest, which lists his last residence as Tokyo and his occupation as "laborer and farmer". The ship's manifest lists his destination as the Japanese Methodist Mission on Pine Street.

By 1910, Kayamori was living in a Seattle's Welcome Hotel and working as a "cleaner and passer" at a dye works, according to census records. Around 1912, he moved to Yakutat, a small Tlingit village in southeast Alaska, where he worked in the Libby, McNeil & Libby fish cannery. Racist attitudes and active unions at the time ensured that the jobs available to Japanese immigrants on the West Coast were largely limited to agricultural, railroad, laundry and cannery work. Today, Yakutat is a large (9860 square mile), sparsely populated, consolidated city/borough.

After his father's death, Kayamori's mother went to live with her grandson's family in Manchuria, then a Japanese colony. According to family members, Kayamori sent letters, money, pictures, toys and once a whole salmon packed in salt.

In Yakutat, children just called Kayamori Picture Man. For thirty years, he photographed celebrations, ceremonies, Tlingit culture, and the growing influences of colonialism. Kayamori had a box camera with a hood, and a darkroom in his small house near the cannery on Monti Bay.

Yakutat's exposed Pacific coastline made it vulnerable and U.S. military forces began to fortify the area as World War II escalated. Soldiers warned Yakutat residents to prepare for an attack.

In October 1940, FBI director J. Edgar Hoover sent a letter to the bureau's Juneau agent requesting the names of "persons who should be considered for custodial detention pending investigation in the event of a national emergency." The reply included the name S. Kayamori and a description: "Is reported to be an enthusiastic photographer and to have panoramic views of the Alaskan coast line [sic] from Yakutat to Cape Spencer."

A day before the Japanese bombed Pearl Harbor, Hoover wrote to the War Department's military intelligence division requesting information on a number of individuals. Under Kayamori's name the reply noted: "Reported on suspect list, Alaska." After the bombing of Pearl Harbor on December 7, 1941, soldiers reportedly beat up the 64-year-old, 5-foot-3 (160 cm) photographer, according to a town resident. Locals say Kayamori knew he would soon be arrested and interned. On December 9, he committed suicide in his home.

Under cause of death, his death certificate asks "Drug?" The doctor who responded to Kayamori's death later wrote that he found evidence of an attempt to burn some documents. Locals say soldiers buried Kayamori across the bay, a site that was later paved for a naval ramp.

== Photograph collection ==
Twenty years later, a Yakutat couple found boxes of Kayamori's negatives, mostly fragile 5×7 inch glass plates, in the attic of an abandoned church mission house scheduled for demolition. Yakutat residents eventually delivered the collection to the Alaska State Library in Juneau.

In the late 70s, the city of Yakutat and the library shared expenses to develop two sets of prints from about seven hundred negatives, and to make copy negatives of about three hundred photographs. A group of Yakutat residents met with the state librarian to identify people and places in the pictures. One set of prints currently resides at the Yakutat City Hall, the other at the state library, which lists 694 photographs.

According to the library, ethnologists and historians from various universities have studied the photo collection, listed under the name Fhoki [sic] Kayamori. Kayamori family members have confirmed that the photographer's first name was actually Seiki, though Kayamori himself sometimes signed his name "Shoki." The Alaska Historical Library collection includes at least three pictures of Kayamori (ASL-P55-140, ASL-P55-197 & ASL-P55-714). The Sealaska Heritage Institute owns another image of the photographer (SHI72-140).

== Sources and external links ==
- Guide to the Fhoki [sic] Kayamori Photograph Collection, [ASL-PCA-055] ca. 1912-1941, Finding aid prepared by Alaska State Library, 1976.
- Spartz, India, and Ron Inouye, "Fhoki [sic] Kayamori: Amateur Photographer of Yakutat, 1912-41". Alaska History 6, no. 2, Fall 1991.
- Thomas, Margaret. "Was Kayamori a spy?" Alaska magazine, Nov. 1995, pp. 48+.
- "Kayamori" at Alaska's Digital Archive (photographs)
- Kayamori Photograph Collection at the University of Alaska Fairbanks
- Thomas, Margaret. Picture Man: The legacy of Southeast Alaska photographer Shoki Kayamori. Fairbanks, AK: Alaska University Press. 2015.
