= Tana Glacier =

Glacier in Alaska

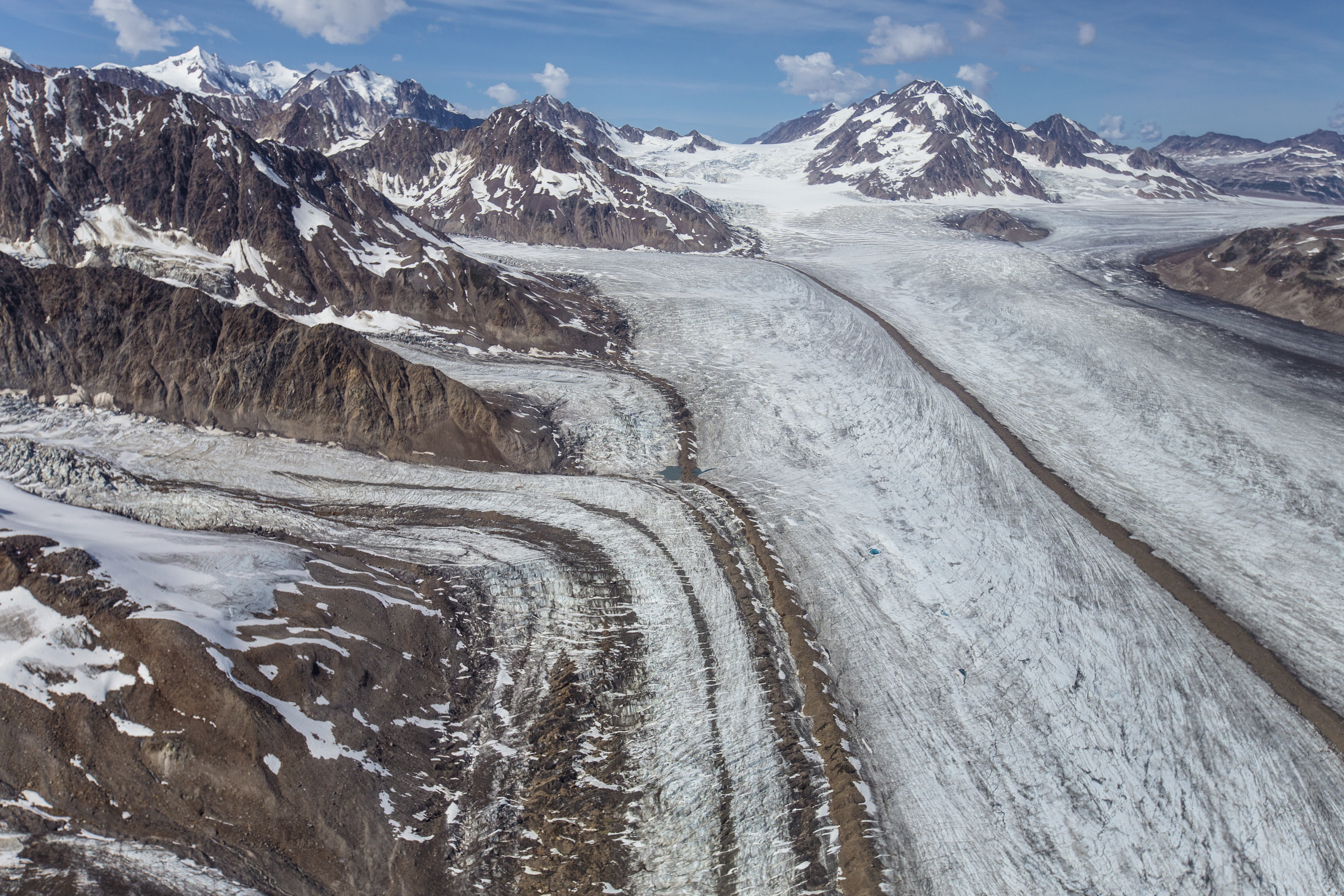
- Western Tributary of Tana Glacier

- Location within Alaska
- Interactive map of Tana Glacier
- Type: Valley glacier
- Location: Copper River Census Area, Alaska, U.S.
- Coordinates: 60°43′53″N 142°43′51″W
- Length: 17 mi (27 km)
- Terminus: outwash plains
- Status: Retreating

Tana Glacier is a 17 mi (27 km) long glacier in the U.S. state of Alaska. It begins at Bagley Icefield and flows northwest to its 1950 terminus near the head of the Tana River. Its name, of Alaska Native origin, was first recorded by prospectors in 1900. The warmest month is August, at -2 °C, and the coldest month is January, at -20 °C.

== See also ==
- List of glaciers
