= Leonidas I. Robinson =

Leonidas L. Robinson
- Died: June 6, 1891 (aged 13–14); Sitka, Alaska
- Military career
- Allegiance: United States of America
- Branch: United States Navy
- Service years: 1889-1891
- Rank: 3rd Lieutenant

Third Lieutenant Leonidas L. Robinson (unknown–June 6, 1891) was the first graduate of the School of Instruction of the Revenue Cutter Service to die in the line of duty. He drowned during small-boat operations June 6, 1891 at Icy Bay near Yakutat, Alaska, while assigned to the USRC Bear. He was a member of the graduating class of 1889 and is honored on the Wall of Remembrance at the United States Coast Guard Academy. The Wall of Remembrance honors those graduates who perished during an operational mission.

He is buried in Sitka National Cemetery.
