= Icy Bay Airport =

- IATA: ICY; ICAO: none; FAA LID: 19AK

Summary
- Airport type: Private use
- Owner: Alaska Mental Health Trust
- Serves: Icy Bay, Alaska
- Elevation AMSL: 50 ft (15 m)
- Coordinates: 59°58′08″N 141°39′42″W

Map
- Location of airport in Alaska

Runways
Direction	Length		Surface
Direction	ft	m	Surface
5/23	3,430	1,045	Gravel

Statistics (1991)
- Aircraft operations: 550
- Source: Federal Aviation Administration

Icy Bay Airport (IATA: ICY, FAA LID: 19AK) is a private-use airport serving Icy Bay, in the Yakutat City and Borough of U.S. state of Alaska. It is owned by Alaska Mental Health Trust.

Scheduled passenger service to Yakutat Airport (via Alsek Air Service) ended in 2012, when the United States Department of Transportation suspended Essential Air Service subsidies.

== Facilities and aircraft ==
Icy Bay Airport resides at elevation of 50 feet (15 m) above mean sea level. It has one runway designated 5/23 with a gravel surface measuring 3,430 by 55 feet (1,045 x 17 m).

For the 12-month period ending October 5, 1991, the airport had 550 aircraft operations, an average of 45 per month: 54.5% general aviation and 45.5% air taxi.

== See also ==
- List of airports in Alaska

== Other sources ==
- Essential Air Service documents (Docket DOT-OST-1996-2009) from the U.S. Department of Transportation:
  - Order 2002-12-26 (December 31, 2002): selecting Cordova Air Service, Inc., to provide subsidized essential air service at Cape Yakataga and Icy Bay, Alaska, at a subsidy rate of $40,619 a year (flying to/from Cordova).
  - Order 2004-9-24 (September 28, 2004): selecting Copper River Air Taxi to provide essential air service to Cape Yakataga and Icy Bay, Alaska, at a subsidy rate of $61,840 per year (flying to/from Cordova).
  - Order 2006-9-22 (September 22, 2006): selecting Alsek Air Service, Inc. to provide subsidized essential air service at Cape Yakataga and Icy Bay, Alaska, at an annual subsidy rate of $64,510 for the period of November 1, 2006, through October 31, 2008 (flying to/from Yakutat).
  - Order 2008-7-28 (July 25, 2008): selecting Alsek Air Service, Inc., to provide subsidized essential air service at Cape Yakataga and Icy Bay, Alaska, at an annual subsidy rate of $78,000 for the period of November 1, 2008, through October 31, 2010 (flying to/from Yakutat).
  - Order 2010-9-21 (September 17, 2010): re-selecting Alsek Air Service, Inc., to provide subsidized essential air service (EAS) at Cape Yakataga and Icy Bay, Alaska, at an annual subsidy rate of $91,000 for the period of November 1, 2010, through October 21, 2012. Three round trips each week to Cape Yakataga and Icy Bay from May through October (peak season) and round trips each week from November through April (off-peak season) on 4-seat or 5-seat Cessna.
  - Order 2012-11-21 (November 19, 2012): suspending the EAS subsidy for Icy Bay, Alaska, upon expiration of the current EAS contract on October 31, 2012, and allowing Alsek Air Service to suspend service (per the Alaska DOT&PF: “the land at and around Icy Bay airport was acquired by the Alaska Mental Health Trust (AMHT), which has converted the Icy Bay airport to Private use and this is so noted on the FAA’s Airport Master Record. In this regard we do not currently support EAS at Icy Bay.”)
