= Guyot Glacier =

Glacier in Alaska, United States

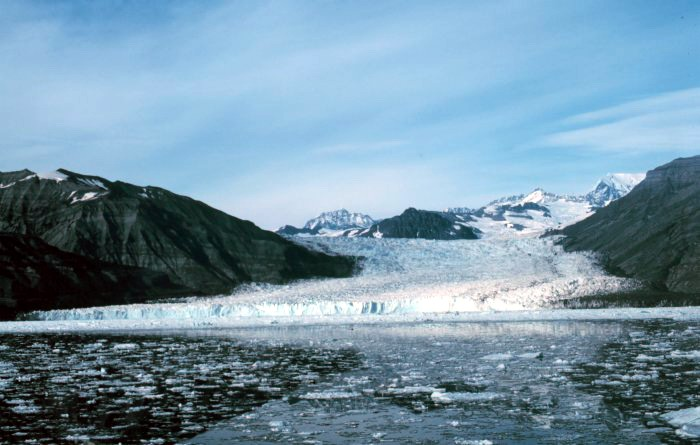
- Guyot Glacier in September 1977

- Location within Alaska
- Interactive map of Guyot Glacier
- Location: Yakutat City and Borough, Alaska, U.S.
- Coordinates: 60°10′33″N 141°39′08″W

Guyot Glacier is a 34-mile (55 km) long and 8-mile (13 km) wide glacier located in the east end of the Robinson Mountains in the U.S. state of Alaska. It begins 5.6 mi (9.0 km) north of Yaga Peak and heads east-southeast to Icy Bay, south of the Guyot Hills and 73 miles (117 km) northwest of Yakutat. It borders Yahtse Glacier on the northeast. The glacier was named by the New York Times expedition of 1886 for Arnold Henry Guyot.

== See also ==
- List of glaciers
- Tyndall Glacier
