= Mount Saint Elias =

Mountain on the United States–Canada border

- Yasʼéitʼaa Shaa or Was'eitushaa
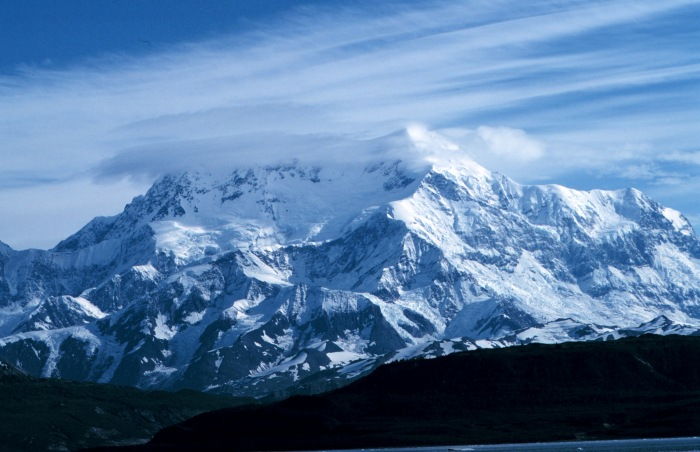
- Mount St. Elias from Icy Bay, Alaska

Highest point
- Elevation: 18,008 ft (5,489 m); NAVD88
- Prominence: 11,250 ft (3,430 m)
- Parent peak: Mount Logan
- Isolation: 25.6 mi (41.2 km)
- Listing: World most prominent peaks 53rd; North America highest peaks 4th; North America prominent peaks 11th; Canada highest major peaks 2nd; US highest major peaks 2nd
- Coordinates: 60°17′32″N 140°55′53″W

Geography
- Location within Alaska Location within Yukon
- Location: Yakutat City and Borough, Alaska, U.S./Yukon, Canada
- Parent range: Saint Elias Mountains
- Topo map(s): USGS Mt. Saint Elias; NTS 115C7 Newton Glacier

Climbing
- First ascent: 1897 by Duke of the Abruzzi
- Easiest route: glacier/snow/ice climb

Mount Saint Elias (Was'eitushaa, also designated Boundary Peak 186) is an 18,008 foot (5,489 m) mountain located approximately 11 miles (18 km) northeast of the Pacific Ocean on the Yukon-Alaska border. It is the second-highest mountain in both Canada and the United States, as well as in the Yukon and Alaska. The Canadian side of Mount Saint Elias forms part of Kluane National Park and Reserve, while the U.S. side of the mountain is located within Wrangell–St. Elias National Park and Preserve.

Although it is only 26 miles (42 km) southwest of Mount Logan, the highest mountain in Canada, it nonetheless retains a high prominence due to the low Columbus-Seward Glacier separating them. Due to notoriously bad weather and difficult climbing routes, Mount Saint Elias is infrequently climbed.

== History and features ==
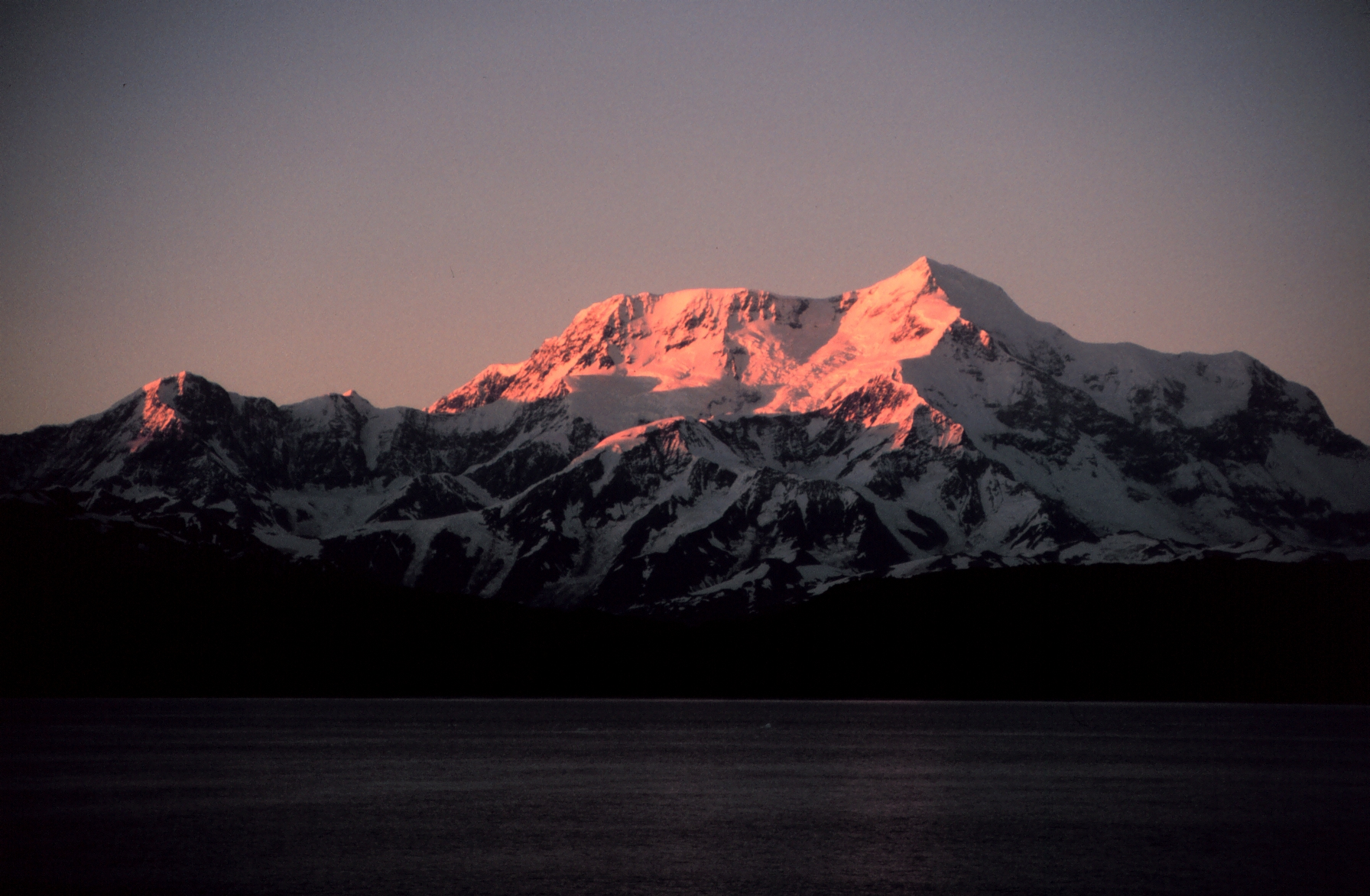
Mount Saint Elias from Icy Bay

The name of the mountain in Tlingit, Yasʼéitʼaa Shaa or Was'eitushaa, means "mountain behind Icy Bay"; the Yakutat Tlingit occasionally call it Shaa Tlein "Big Mountain". It is one of the most important crests of the Kwaashkʼiḵwáan clan, who used it as a guide during their journey down the Copper River. Mount Fairweather at the apex of the British Columbia and Alaska borders at the head of the Alaska Panhandle is known as Tsalx̱aan; legend states that this mountain and Yasʼéitʼaa Shaa (Mt. St. Elias) originally stood next to each other, but had an argument and separated. Their children, the mountains in between the two peaks, are called Tsalx̱aan Yátxʼi ("Children of Tsalxaan").

European explorers first sighted the mountain on July 16, 1741, with the arrival of the expedition commanded by Vitus Bering, a Danish-born Russian explorer to what is now called Cape Saint Elias. While some historians contend that Bering named the mountain (in honor of Elias I of Jerusalem), others believe that eighteenth-century mapmakers named it after Cape Saint Elias when Bering left the peak unnamed.

Mount Saint Elias is notable for its immense vertical relief. Its summit rises 18,008 ft (5,489 m) vertically in just 10 miles (16 km) horizontal distance from the head of Taan Fjord, off of Icy Bay.

In 2007, Gerald Salmina directed an Austrian documentary film, Mount St. Elias, about a team of skier/mountaineers determined to make "the planet's longest skiing descent" by ascending the mountain and then skiing nearly all 18,000 ft (5,500 m) down to the Gulf of Alaska; the movie finished editing and underwent limited release in 2009. The climbers ended up summiting on the second attempt and skiing down to 13,000 ft (3,960 m).

== Weather ==
Mount Saint Elias experiences some of the most severe weather conditions of any major peak in North America, characterized by prolonged storms, extreme precipitation, and hurricane-force winds. The mountain's proximity to the Pacific Ocean—rising 18,008 ft (5,489 m) in just 10 miles (16 km) from sea level at Icy Bay—places it directly in the path of intense Aleutian Low pressure systems that track northeast from the Gulf of Alaska.

The Saint Elias Mountains region receives between 79 inches (200 cm) to more than 280 inches (710 cm) of precipitation annually, predominantly as snow. The mountain's extreme vertical relief creates powerful orographic lift, forcing moisture-laden Pacific air masses upward and producing intense snowfall. Storm systems can arrive with minimal warning, and conditions can deteriorate from clear visibility to sub-zero temperatures, hurricane-force winds, and complete whiteout in minutes.

Historical climbing accounts document the mountain's notorious weather. During a 1992 winter expedition attempt, storms deposited approximately 20 feet (6.1 m) of snow in under three weeks, forcing abandonment of the climb. A 1963 expedition experienced three consecutive days of rain despite preparation advice that "it never rains in the St. Elias Mountains." The 1946 Harvard Mountaineering Club expedition required multiple air supply drops and eleven camps due to extended periods of severe weather.

Winter conditions are particularly extreme, with temperatures dropping below −40 °F (−40 °C) and wind chills approaching −80 °F (−62 °C) to −100 °F (−73 °C) when combined with sustained winds of 60 miles per hour (97 km/h) to 100 miles per hour (160 km/h) or greater. The mountain's position at approximately 60°N latitude means winter climbing occurs in near-continuous darkness. These factors contributed to Mount Saint Elias not receiving its first winter ascent until February 1996, nearly a century after its first summer ascent and decades after other major North American peaks had been climbed in winter.

The combination of extreme weather, technical difficulty, and remoteness has resulted in Mount Saint Elias having one of the highest expedition failure rates of any major peak in Alaska or Yukon. Modern climbers are advised that the mountain receives snow in every month of the year, and that prolonged storm systems can trap expeditions for weeks at high camps.

== Climbing history ==
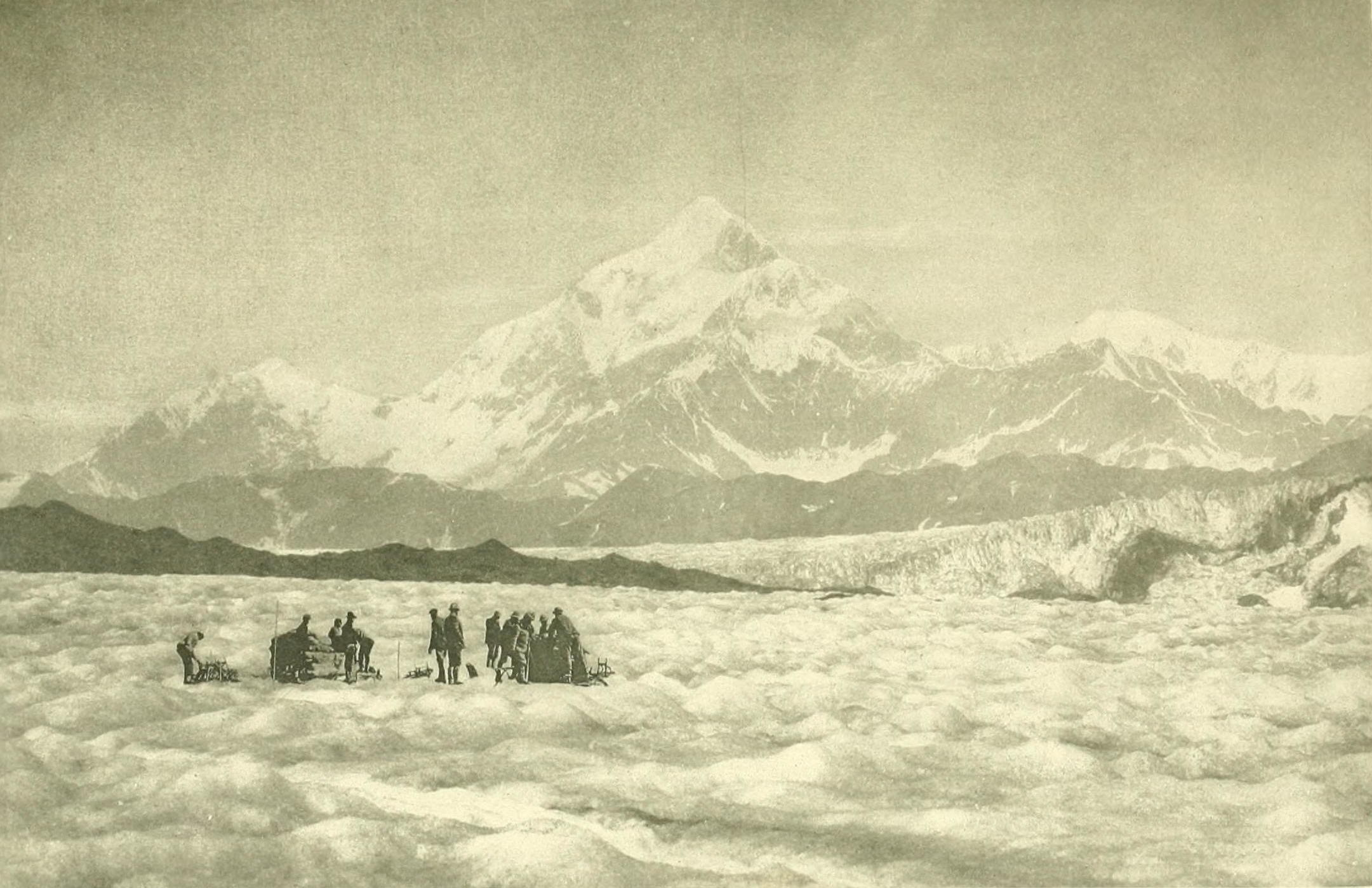
Mount St Elias from Malaspina Glacier, photograph by Vittorio Sella on the first expedition to climb the mountain, 1897

Mount Saint Elias was first climbed on July 31, 1897, by an Italian expedition led by famed explorer Prince Luigi Amedeo, Duke of the Abruzzi, (who also reconnoitered the current standard route on K2 in 1909). Noted mountain photographer Vittorio Sella was also a member in the expedition.

The second ascent was not until 1946, when a group from the Harvard Mountaineering Club including noted mountain historian Dee Molenaar climbed the Southwest Ridge route. The summit party comprised Molenaar, his brother Cornelius, Andrew and Betty Kauffman, Maynard Miller, William Latady, and Benjamin Ferris. William Putnam was a member of the expedition but did not make the summit. They used eleven camps, eight of which were on the approach from Icy Bay, and three of which were on the mountain. They were supported by multiple air drops of food.

The Northwest Ridge was first climbed in July 1965, also from the Harvard Mountaineering Club. The team established five camps from July 12 to 27. On the way to camp V a heavy wind-slab avalanche crashed down onto the team. No serious injuries occurred but the aftermath caused several members to return to base camp. On July 30 starting at 7 am from Camp V, the expedition reached the summit 12 hours later. The summit party included Boyd N. Everett, Jr. (leader), Dr. Gordon Benner, Joseph Davidson, Dennis Eberl, Leon Story, and William Van de Graaff. Edwin Bernbaum was a member of the expedition but did not make the summit.

The first winter ascent was made on February 13, 1996, by David Briggs, Gardner Heaton and Joe Reichert. After being flown by pilots Steve Ranney and Gary Graham, in to 2,300 ft (700 m) on the Tyndall Glacier, they climbed the southwest ridge and followed the "Milk Bowl" variation in order to avoid 2,000 feet of loose rock on the normal route. The team had originally planned to begin their ascent from the ocean and cross the Tyndall Glacier but the terrain was in very poor condition.

Mount Saint Elias is infrequently climbed today, despite its height, because it has no easy route to the summit and because of its prolonged periods of bad weather (mainly snow and low visibility).

== Routes ==
- Abruzzi Ridge

== See also ==
- List of mountain peaks of North America
  - List of mountain peaks of Canada
  - List of mountain peaks of the United States
- List of Boundary Peaks of the Alaska–British Columbia/Yukon border
- Mount Newton
- Haydon Peak
