= Bagley Icefield =

Icefield in Alaska, United States

- Bagley Ice Valley
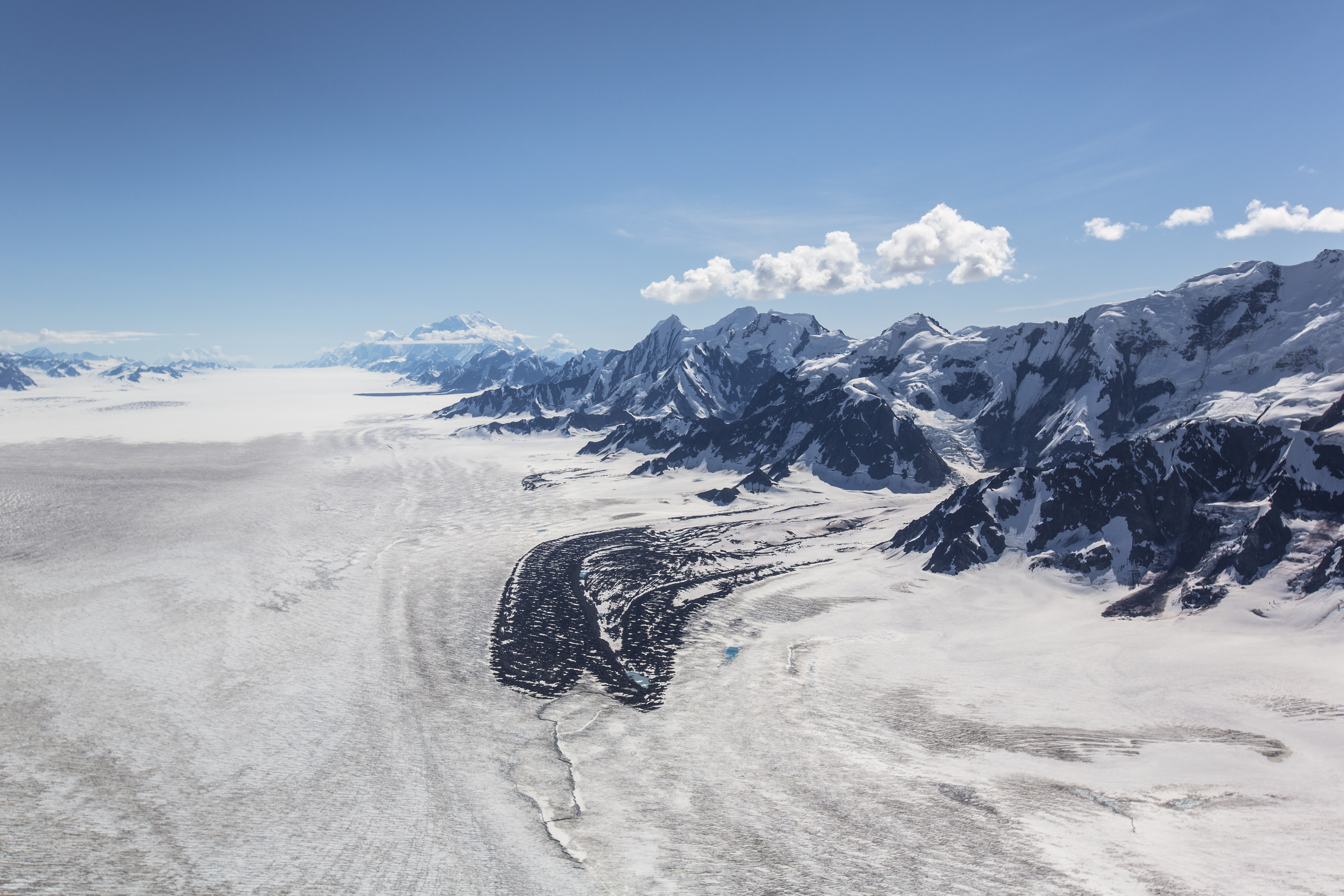
- Bagley Icefield, looking southeast towards Mount St. Elias

- Location within Alaska
- Interactive map of Bagley Icefield
- Type: Icefield
- Location: Yakutat City and Borough, Alaska, Chugach Census Area, Alaska and Copper River Census Area, Alaska, Alaska, U.S.
- Coordinates: 60°29′01″N 141°35′01″W
- Terminus: outflow glaciers

The Bagley Icefield (also called Bagley Ice Valley) in southeastern Alaska is the second largest nonpolar icefield in North America. It was named after James W. Bagley, a USGS topographic engineer who developed the Bagley T-3 camera and mapped Alaska prior to World War I.

At 200 km (127 mi) long, 10 km (6 mi) wide, and up to 1 km (3,000 ft) thick, it covers most of the core of the Saint Elias Mountains and part of the Chugach Mountains. It nourishes dozens of valley glaciers that drain down both sides of the range, including the Tana, Miles, and Guyot glaciers. The area of the combined Bagley Icefield and Bering Glacier System, including tributaries, is 5,200 km² (1,900 sq mi).

== History ==
19th-century explorers attempting to climb Mt. St. Elias, including Luigi Amedeo, Duke of the Abruzzi, who successfully made the first ascent in 1897, did not recognize that the huge glacier now named Bagley Icefield actually forms the upper reaches of the distant and similarly vast Bering Glacier, which had been named earlier, after observation from the coast.

The glacier is protected within the boundaries of the Wrangell-St. Elias National Park and Preserve.

== See also ==
- List of glaciers
