= Icy Bay =

Body of water in Yakutat borough, Alaska, US

- Lig̲aasi Áa (Tlingit)
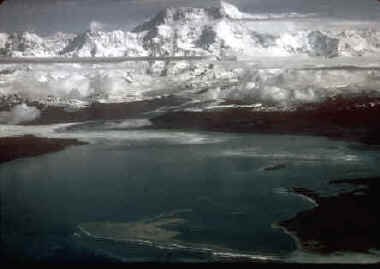
- Glaciers at Icy Bay with Mount Saint Elias in the background

- Location in Alaska
- Location: Yakutat, Alaska
- Coordinates: 59°59′24″N 141°23′25″W
- Type: Fjord
- Ocean/sea sources: Pacific Ocean

Icy Bay (Tlingit: Lig̲aasi Áa) is a body of water in the borough of Yakutat, Alaska, formed in the last 100 years by the rapid retreat of the Guyot, Yahtse, and Tyndall Glaciers. It is part of the Wrangell-Saint Elias Wilderness.

At the beginning of the 20th century, the bay entrance was permanently blocked by a giant tidewater glacier face that calved icebergs directly into the Gulf of Alaska. A century-long glacial retreat has opened a multi-armed bay more than 30 miles (48 km) long.

Icy Bay is a popular destination for sea kayakers, and is reachable by bush plane from Yakutat, Alaska.

== 2015 landslide and megatsunami ==
At 8:19 p.m. Alaska Daylight Time on October 17, 2015, the side of a mountain collapsed on the western end of the head of Taan Fiord, a finger of Icy Bay formed by the retreat of Tyndall Glacier. The resulting landslide generated a megatsunami in Taan Fjord. The area is uninhabited and no one was visiting it at the time, and the event went undetected for several hours until its signature was noted as a 4.9 magnitude event on seismograms at Columbia University in New York City.

Scientists visited the fjord in the spring and summer of 2016 to gather data on the event. Their studies revealed that the landslide consisted of about 200,000,000 short tons (179,000,000 long tons; 181,000,000 metric tons) of rock with a volume of 76,000,000 cubic meters (99,400,000 cu yd) and lasted 60 to 100 seconds, reaching a maximum speed of 72 to 108 kilometers per hour (45 to 67 mph). Some of the landslide came to rest on the foot of Tyndall Glacier, but about 180,000,000 short tons (161,000,000 long tons; 163,000,000 metric tons) of rock with a volume of about 50,000,000 cubic meters (65,400,000 cu yd) entered the fjord, where it dislodged another 100,000,000 cubic meters (131,000,000 cu yd) of material from the bottom of the fjord. Some of the landslide's debris traversed the 90-meter-deep (300 ft) water at the head of the fjord and then climbed 105 meters (344 ft) to reach a final resting place at an elevation of about 15 meters (49 ft) on the opposite shore. Altogether, the landslide debris covered 2 square kilometers (0.77 sq mi).

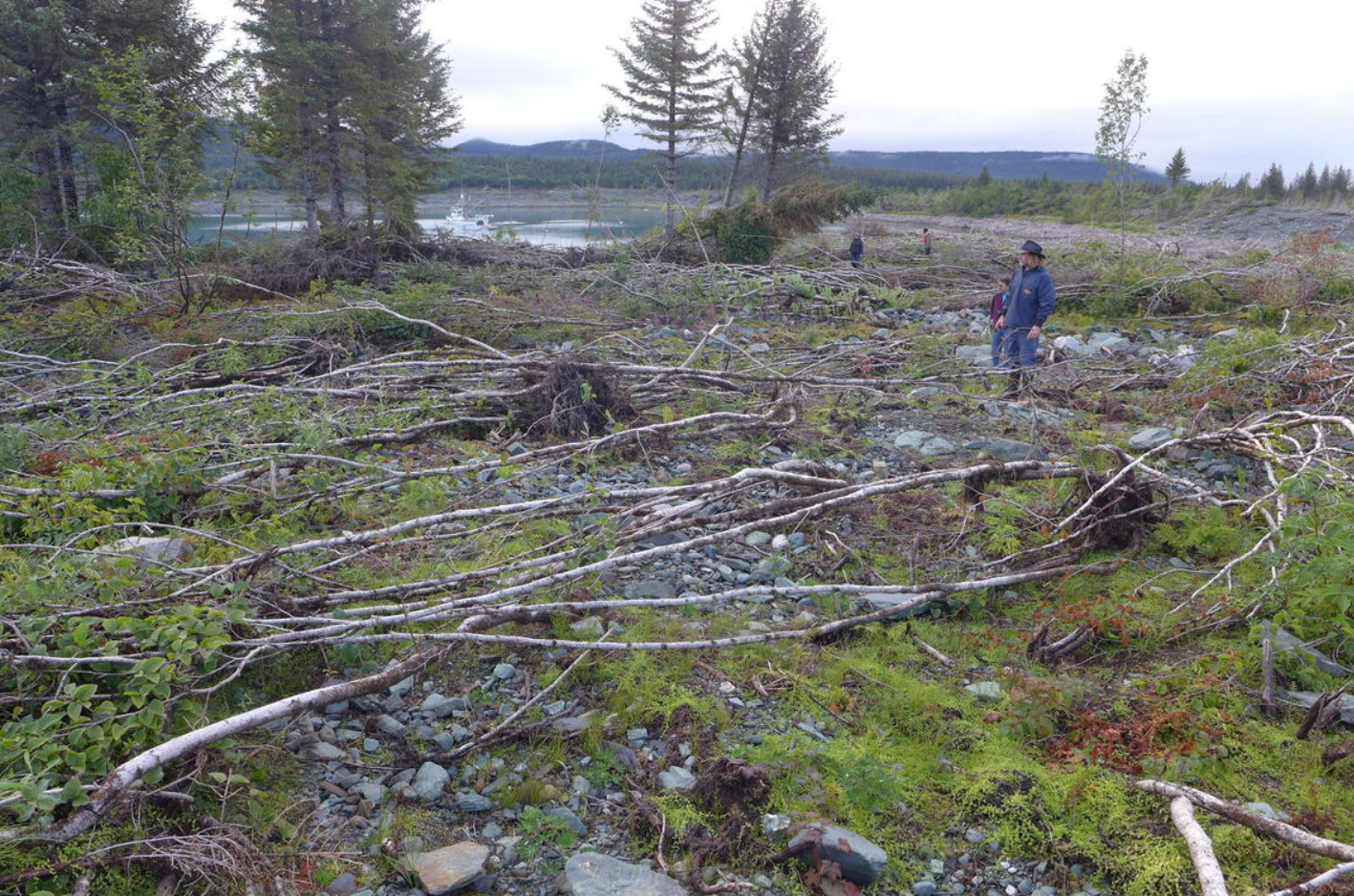
On August 9, 2016, United States Geological Survey scientists survey run-up damage from the October 17, 2015, megatsunami in Taan Fiord. Based on visible damage to trees that remained standing, they estimated run-up heights in this area of 5 meters (16.4 ft).

The landslide generated a megatsunami with an initial height of about 100 meters (328 feet) that struck the opposite shore of the fjord, with a run-up height (i.e., the maximum height on land the megatsunami reached as it ran up the shore) of 193 meters (633 feet). At a speed of up to 60 miles per hour (97 km/h), the megatsunami then continued down the entire length of the fjord – about 15 kilometers (9 miles) – and into Icy Bay. In the uppermost 1.5 kilometres (0.9 mi) of the fjord, run-up exceeded 100 meters (328 ft) along the shore, and run-up heights in the upper part of the fjord otherwise varied between 70 and 100 meters (230 and 328 feet) on the southeast shore and 30 and 60 meters (98 and 197 feet) on the northwest side. In the middle part of the fjord, run-up heights varied greatly, dropping to as low as 3 to 4 meters (10 to 13 feet) in some places but reaching 40 to 60 metres (131 to 197 feet) in others. In the lower fjord, run-up heights on both sides were 15 to 30 meters (49 to 98 feet), increasing to 20 to 30 meters (66 to 98 feet) at the entrance to the fjord. Along its path, the wave inundated an overall area of 20 square kilometers (7.7 sq mi) and left a trim line at its run-up height, stripping away all vegetation, including alder forests, and leaving behind barren beaches that reached elevations of 150 feet (46 m).

The wave may have been about 40 feet (12 m) tall when it entered Icy Bay itself about 12 minutes after the landslide, and it inundated the bay's coastline with run-up levels of as much as 4 to 5 meters (13 to 16 feet) in some places, although the run-up diminished to below the normal high-tide level in Icy Bay at distances greater than 5 kilometres (3.1 mi) from the mouth of Taan Fiord. When it reached the nearest tide gauge, located 140 kilometers (87 miles) to the southeast of the landslide near Yakutat, Alaska, the wave had diminished to a height of 15 centimeters (5.9 inches).

The Taan Fiord event bore a strong similarity to the July 1958 landslide and megatsunami in Alaska's Lituya Bay. The Taan Fiord landslide was the largest recorded in North America since the eruption of Mount St. Helens in May 1980, and the largest non-volcanic landslide in North America ever recorded. The megatsunami was the largest known marine tsunami worldwide since the Lituya Bay wave; although the Taan Fiord landslide was larger than the one at Lituya Bay, the Lituya Bay wave was larger than the one in Taan Fiord because the landslide in Taan Fiord did not fall from as great a height and landed in shallower water. The Taan Fiord wave also was the fourth-largest megatsunami of any type over the previous 100 years, with the fourth-highest run-up ever recorded anywhere in the world. Scientists assessed the landslide occurred because the 17-kilometer (11-mile) retreat of Tyndall Glacier between 1961 and 1991 had left the mountainside unsupported by what had once been about 400 meters (1,300 ft) of glacial ice. They also noted that heavy rains may have weakened the mountainside further, and that seismic waves from a 4.1-magnitude earthquake centered about 500 kilometers (311 mi) away arrived two minutes before the landside began and may also have contributed to the event.

== See also ==
- Icy Bay Airport
