= Yahtse Glacier =

Glacier in Alaska, United States

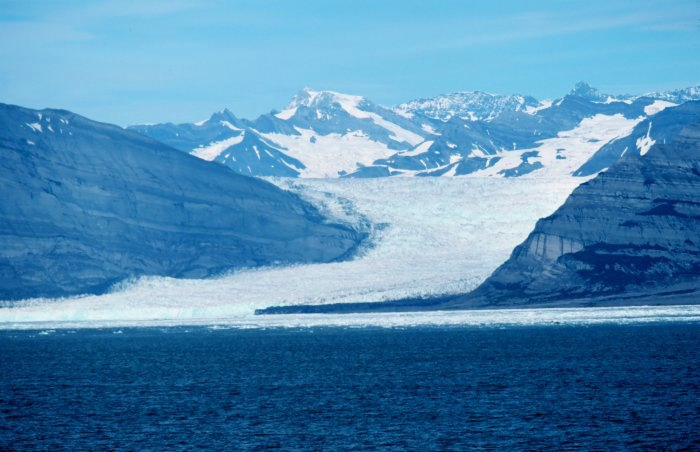
- Yahtse Glacier as it appeared in 1977

- Location within Alaska
- Interactive map of Yahtse Glacier
- Type: Valley glacier
- Location: Yakutat City and Borough, Alaska, U.S.
- Coordinates: 60°18′20″N 141°43′37″W
- Length: 40 miles (64 km)
- Terminus: Sealevel
- Status: Advancing

Yahtse Glacier is a 40-mile-long (64 km) glacier in the U.S. state of Alaska. It begins on the southeast slope of Mount Miller and trends southeast along the north border of Guyot Glacier to Icy Bay, just east of Guyot Hills and 70 miles (110 km) northwest of Yakutat. The western extent is an icefield. The name derives from the Yahtse River and was adopted after the retreat of Guyot Glacier resulted in a separate branch.

== See also ==
- List of glaciers
