= Yakutat, Alaska =

Consolidated city-borough in Alaska, United States

City and Borough of Yakutat Yaakwdáat (Tlingit)
- Home Rule Borough
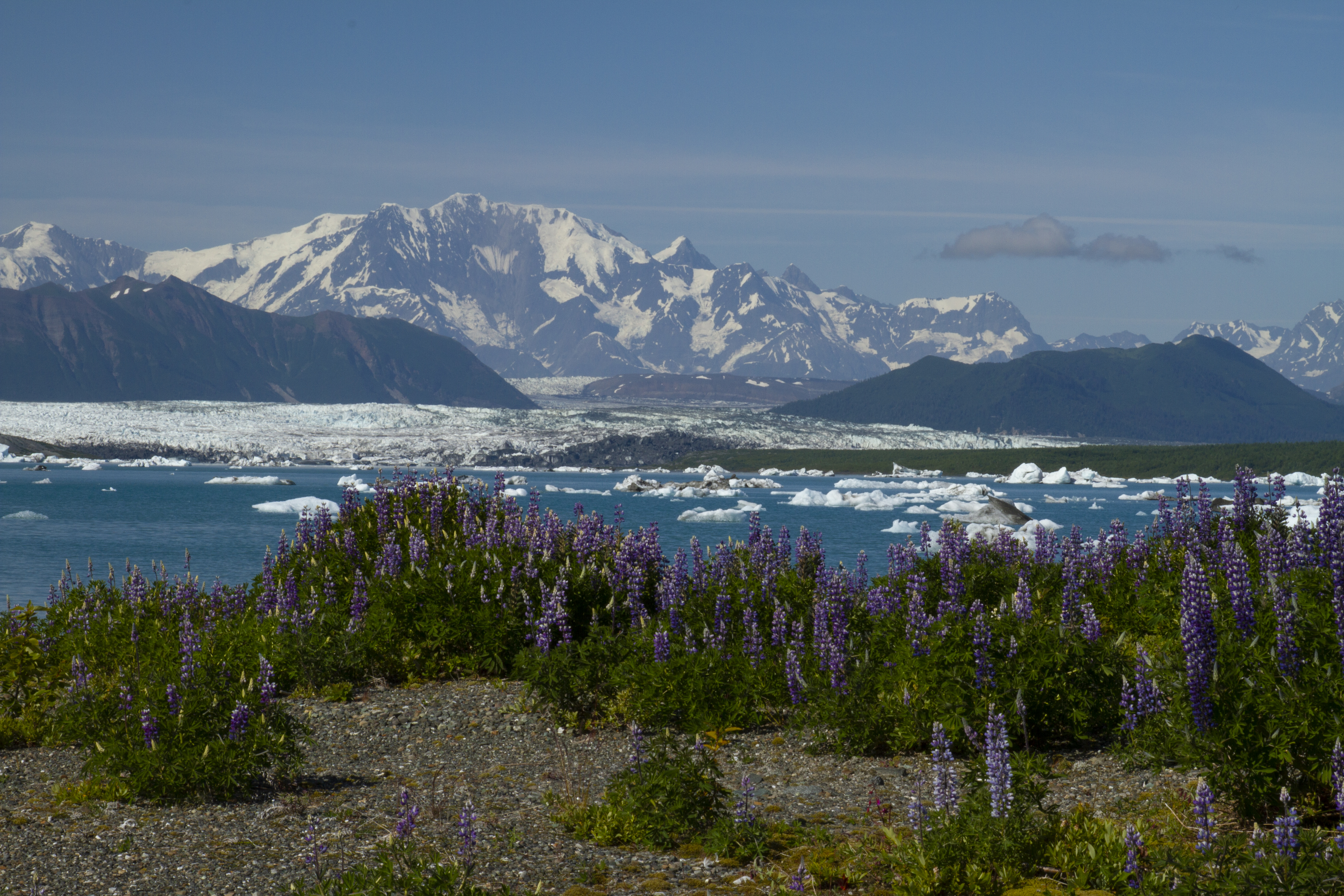
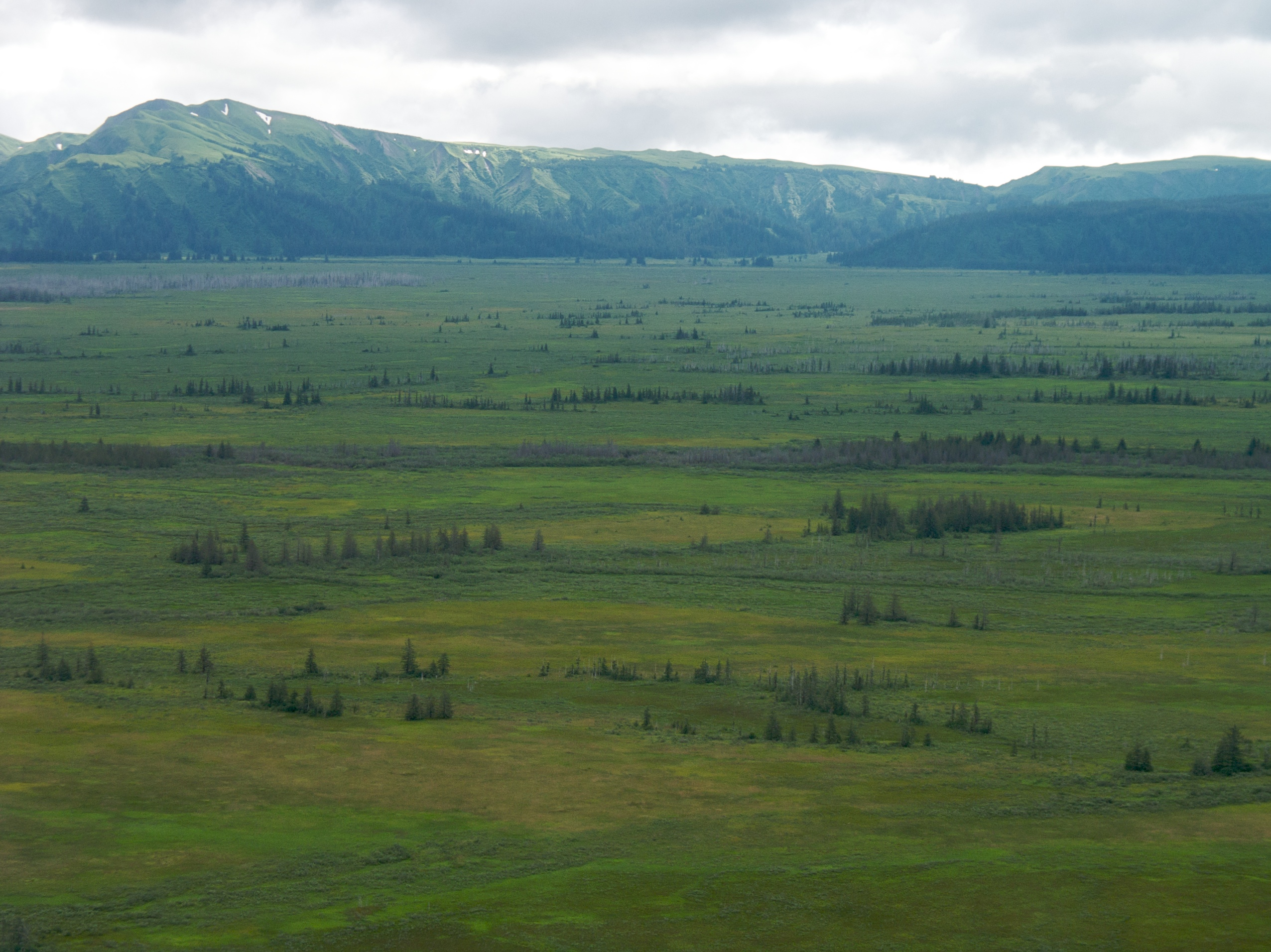
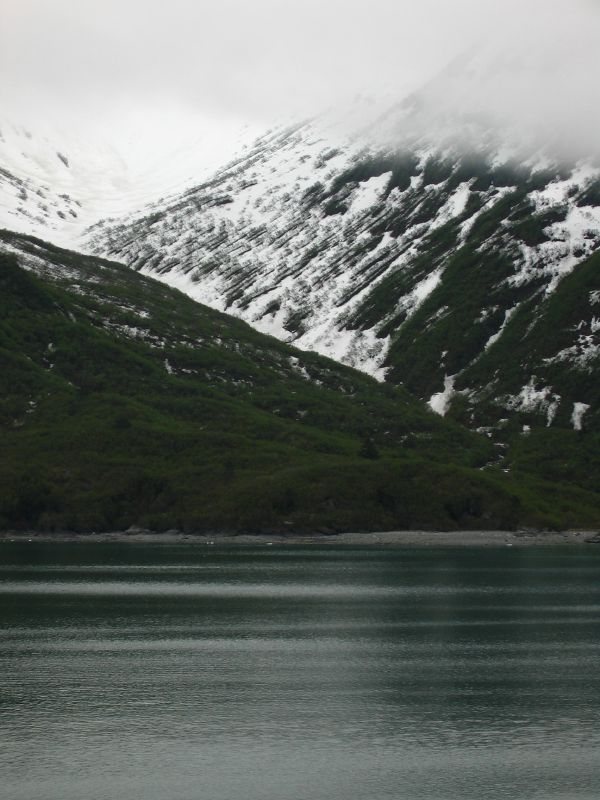
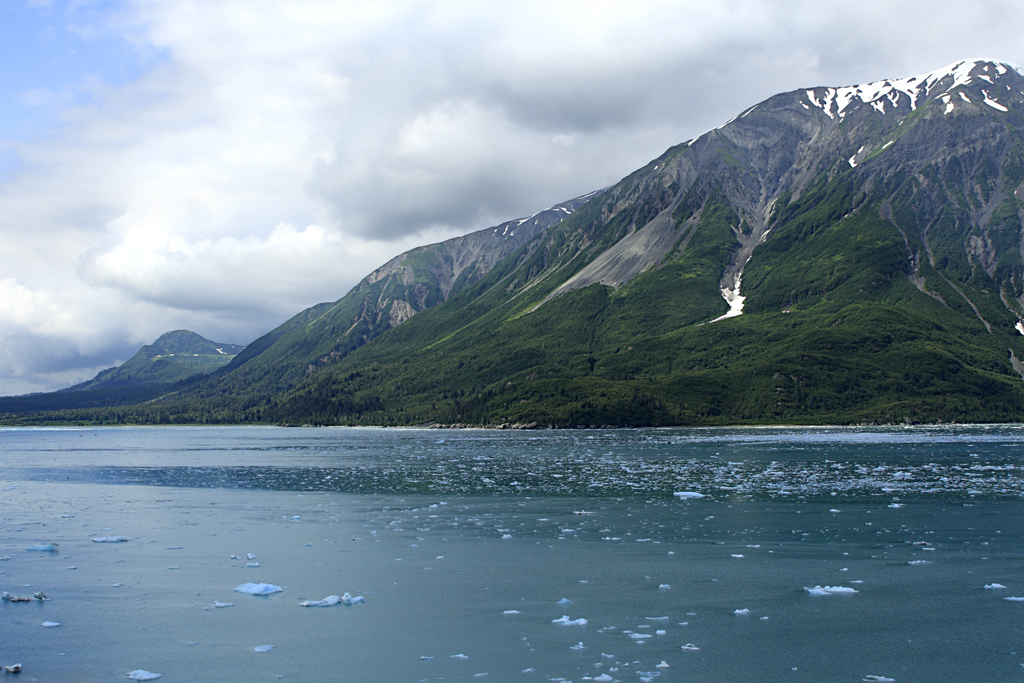
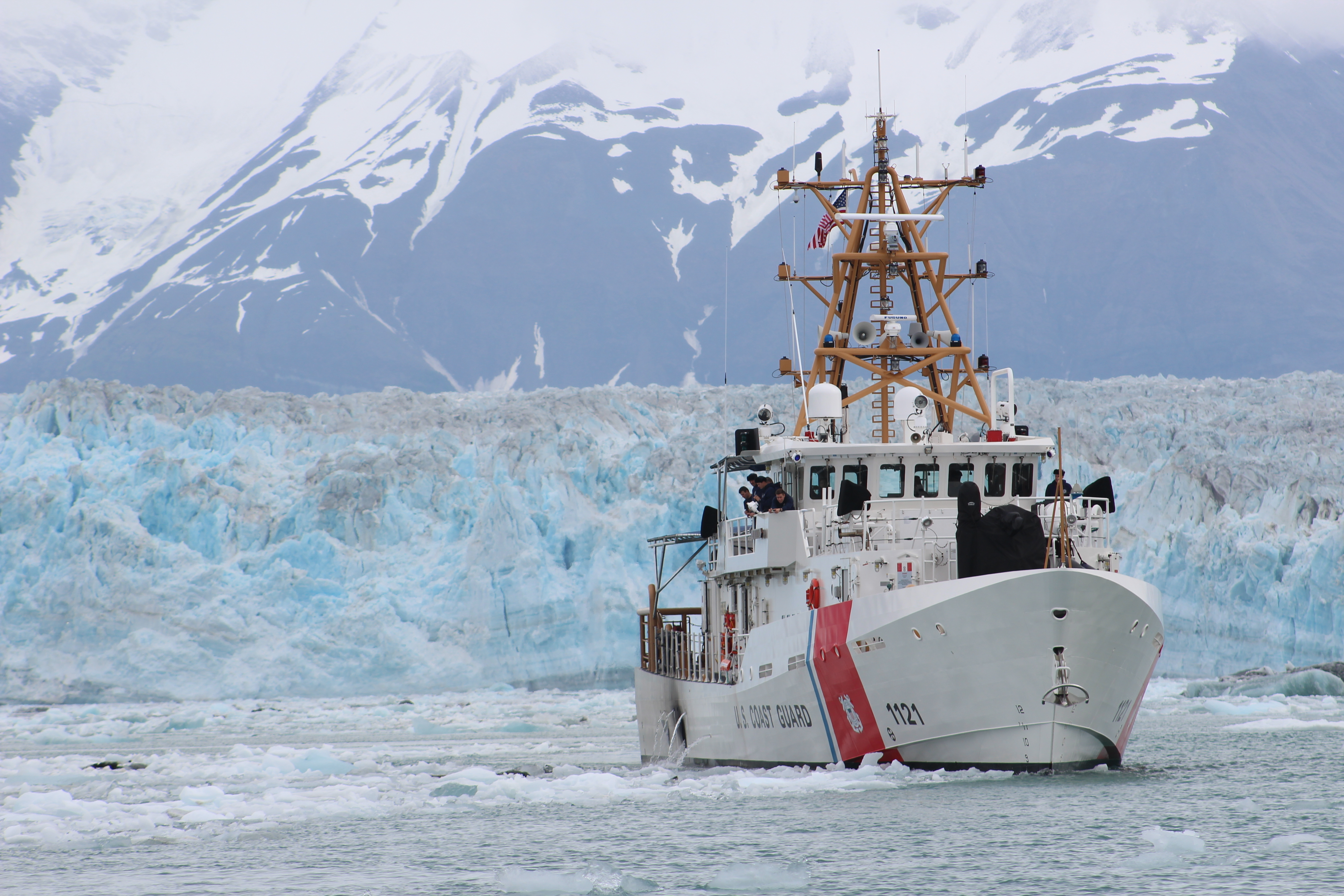
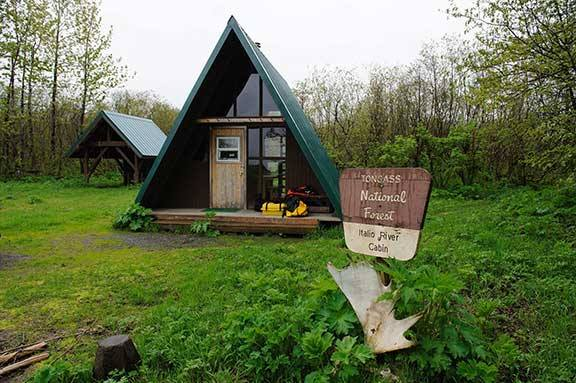
- Shore of Vitus Lake Cape Suckling Yakutat Bay Disenchantment Bay USCGC John F. McCormick at the Hubbard Glacier Cabin at the Italo River in Tongass National Forest

- Seal Logo

- Map of Alaska highlighting Yakutat City and Borough
- Coordinates: 59°32′49″N 139°43′38″W
- Country: United States
- State: Alaska
- Founded: 1903
- Incorporated: September 22, 1992
- Borough seat: Yakutat

Government
  - Mayor: Cindy Bremner

Area
  - Borough: 7,623 sq mi (19,744 km^{2})
  - Urban (CDP): 104.1 sq mi (269.6 km^{2})
  - Land (CDP): 100.5 sq mi (260.3 km^{2})
  - Water (CDP): 3.6 sq mi (9.3 km^{2})
- Elevation: 112 ft (34 m)

Population (2020)
  - Borough: 662
  - Estimate (2025): 672 ▲
  - Density: 6.6/sq mi (2.53/km^{2})
  - Urban (CDP): 657
  - Urban density: 6.31/sq mi (2.44/km^{2})
- Time zone: UTC–9 (Alaska (AKST))
  - Summer (DST): UTC–8 (AKDT)
- ZIP Code: 99689
- Area code: 907
- FIPS code: 02-99282 (borough); 02-86490 (CDP)
- GNIS feature ID: 1415858, 1419986
- Sales tax: 5.0%
- Website: yakutatak.us

The City and Borough of Yakutat (/ˈjækətæt/, YAK-ə-tat; Tlingit: Yaakwdáat) is a borough in the state of Alaska. Yakutat was also the name of a former city within the borough. The name in Tlingit is Yaakwdáat (meaning "the place where canoes rest"). It is derived from an Eyak name, diyaʼqudaʼt, and was influenced by the Tlingit word yaakw ("canoe, boat").

The borough covers an area about six times the size of the state of Rhode Island, making it one of the nation's largest counties or county equivalents. As of the 2020 census the population was 657. As of 2010, it was Alaska's least populous borough or census area, and the ninth-least populous county nationwide. The population declined from 808 in 2000.

The Borough of Yakutat was incorporated as a non-unified Home Rule Borough on September 22, 1992. Yakutat was previously a city in the Skagway–Yakutat–Angoon Census Area (later renamed the Skagway–Hoonah–Angoon Census Area).

The United States Census Bureau has defined the former City of Yakutat as a census-designated place within the borough. The borough's only other significant population center is the community of Icy Bay, the site of the Icy Bay Airport which is in the west-central part of the borough.

== History ==
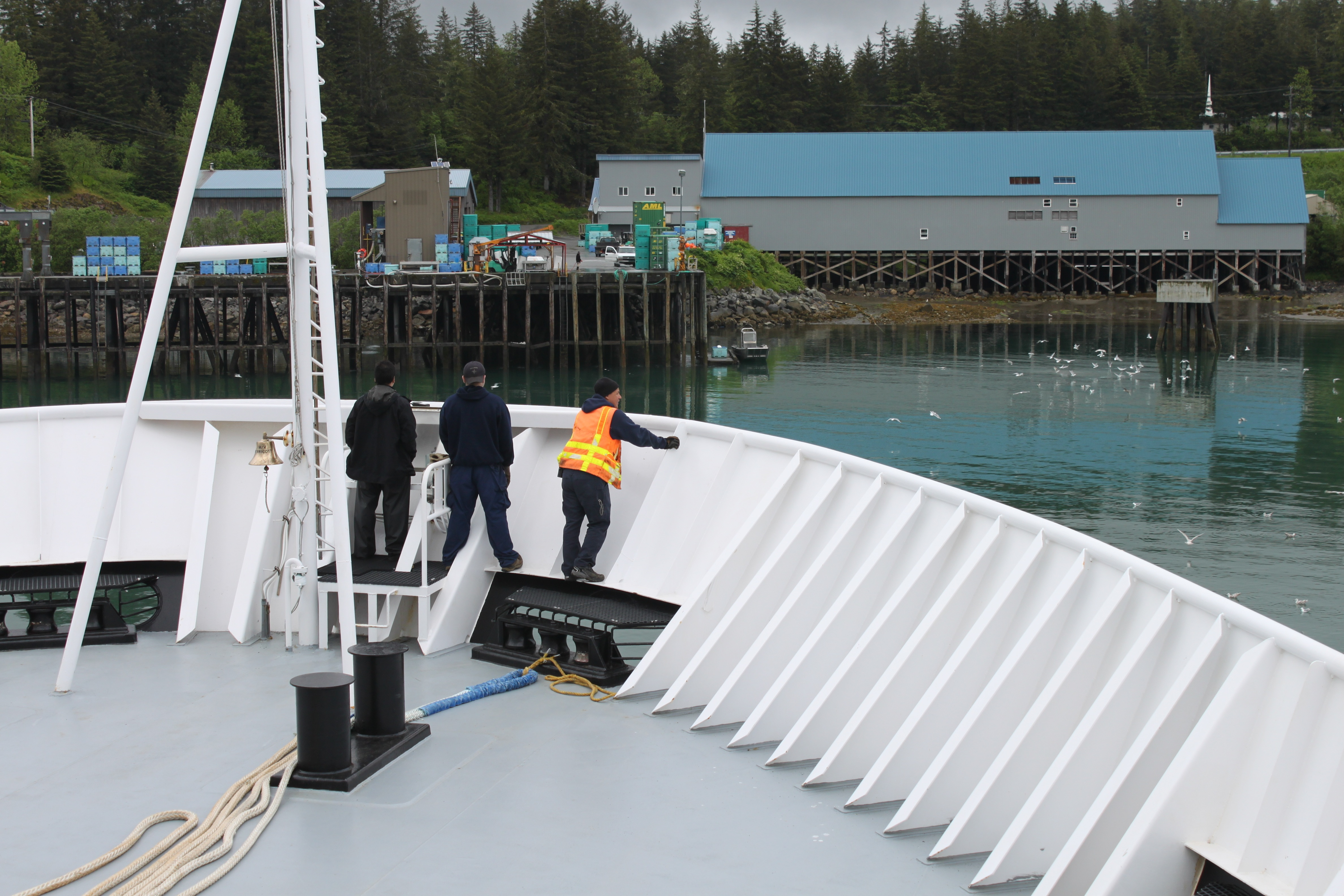
Approaching Yakutat on the Alaska Marine Highway, June 2012

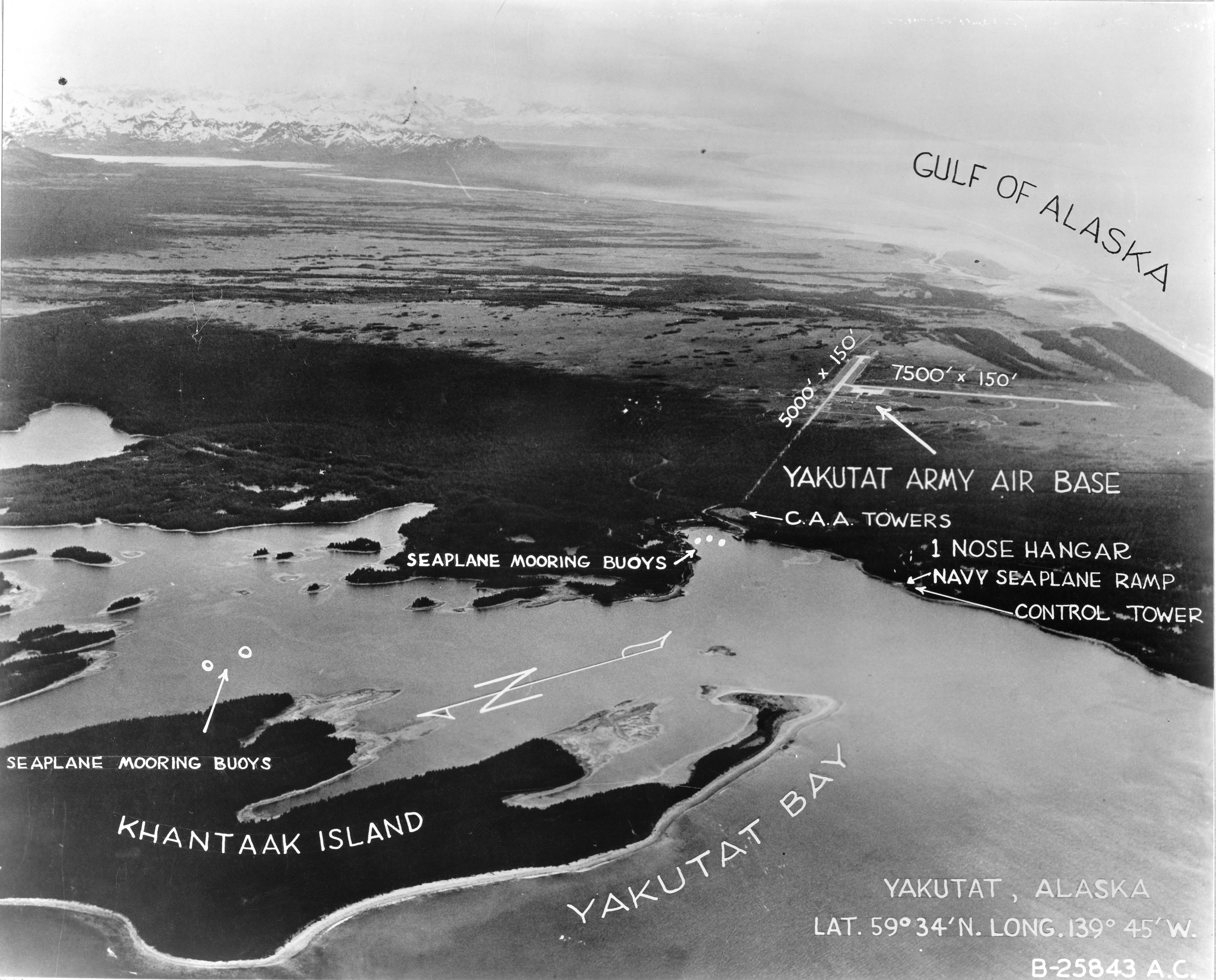
Yakutat in the 1940s

The original settlers in the Yakutat area are believed to have been Eyak-speaking people from the Copper River area. Tlingit people migrated into the region and the Eyak were assimilated into the tribe before the arrival of Europeans in Alaska. Yakutat was only one of a number of Tlingit and mixed Tlingit-Eyak settlements in the region. The others have been depopulated or abandoned.

In the 18th and 19th centuries, English, French, Spanish, and Russian explorers came to the region. The Shelikhov-Golikov Company, a precursor of the Russian-American Company, built a fort in Yakutat in 1795 to facilitate trade with the Alaska Natives in sea-otter pelts. The settlement became known as New Russia, Yakutat Colony, or Slavorossiya. After the Russians cut off access to the fisheries nearby, a Tlingit war party attacked and destroyed the fort in 1805.

By 1886, after the 1867 Alaska Purchase by the United States from the Russian Empire, the area's black sand beaches were being mined for gold. In 1889 the Swedish Free Mission Church opened a school and sawmill in the area.

In around 1903, the Stimson Lumber Company constructed a cannery, another sawmill, a store, and a railroad. Many people moved to the current site of Yakutat to be closer to work at the Stimson cannery, which operated through 1970. During World War II, the USAAF stationed a large aviation garrison near Yakutat and built a paved runway. The troops were withdrawn after the war. The runway is still in use as Yakutat Airport, which offers scheduled airline service.

Fishing is the largest economic activity in Yakutat.

In 2004, the Yakutat Tlingit Tribe (YTT) received a Language Preservation Grant from the Administration for Native Americans. With this, they have reinvigorated their efforts to teach the Tlingit language to middle-aged and young people. YTT received another ANA grant in 2007 and is expanding its role in the schools. All the YTT Tlingit language revitalization work focuses on using communicative approaches to second-language teaching, such as TPR and American Sign Language (ASLA).

While working at a local cannery from 1912 to 1941, Seiki Kayamori extensively photographed Yakutat and its area; Yakutat City Hall holds a large set of prints of his work.

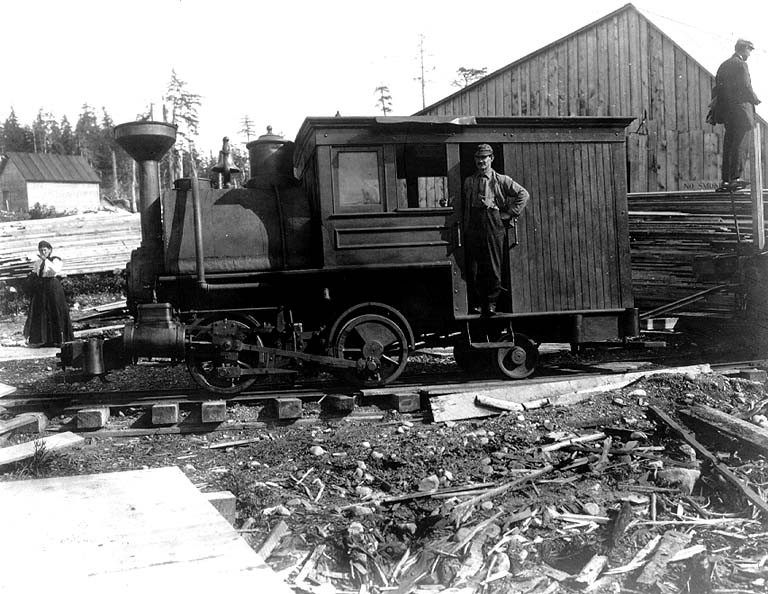
A locomotive of the Yakutat and Southern Railway Co. in Yakutat, September 1, 1907

Yakutat and Southern Railway was a rail operation in the area. It served several canneries south of Yakutat and primarily hauled fish to the harbor. Service ended in the mid-1960s.

== Politics ==
United States presidential election results for Yakutat, Alaska
Year	Republican		Democratic		Third party(ies)	
Year	No.	%	No.	%	No.	%
1960	59	44.70%	73	55.30%	0	0.00%
1964	32	21.19%	119	78.81%	0	0.00%
1968	78	39.00%	102	51.00%	20	10.00%
1972	88	57.89%	58	38.16%	6	3.95%
1976	79	45.14%	90	51.43%	6	3.43%
1980	116	49.57%	76	32.48%	42	17.95%
1984	160	59.26%	96	35.56%	14	5.19%
1988	159	63.10%	80	31.75%	13	5.16%
1992	130	40.50%	108	33.64%	83	25.86%
1996	121	37.58%	149	46.27%	52	16.15%
2000	177	50.00%	118	33.33%	59	16.67%
2004	132	53.88%	105	42.86%	8	3.27%
2008	170	45.58%	188	50.40%	15	4.02%
2012	122	39.87%	171	55.88%	13	4.25%
2016	137	39.60%	163	47.11%	46	13.29%
2020	133	41.96%	160	50.47%	24	7.57%
2024	179	38.00%	271	57.54%	21	4.46%

Historically a swing borough, Yakutat has consistently voted Democratic since 2008.

== Geography ==
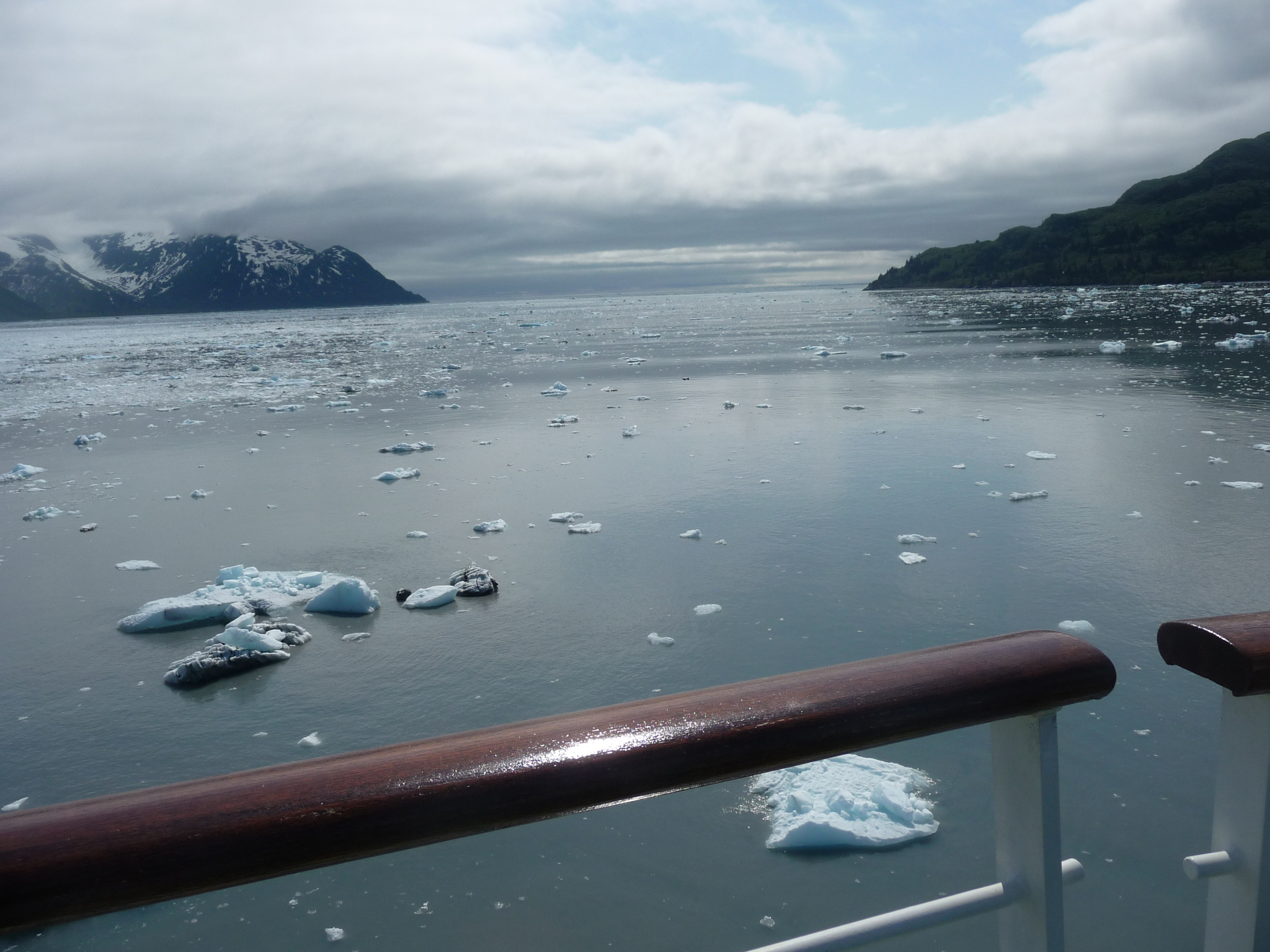
Icebergs in Yakutat Bay

According to the United States Census Bureau, the borough has an area of 9,463 square miles (24,510 km^{2}), of which 7,649 square miles (19,810 km^{2}) is land and 1,813 square miles (4,700 km^{2}) is water. The 2010 census also defines a smaller census-designated place named Yakutat, which has an area of 104.1 square miles (269.6 km^{2}), of which 100.5 square miles (260.3 km^{2}) is land and 3.6 square miles (9.3 km^{2}) is water.

Yakutat's population center is located at 59°32′49″N 139°43′38″W, at the mouth of Yakutat Bay. It lies in an isolated location in lowlands along the Gulf of Alaska, 212 miles (341 kilometres)) northwest of Juneau.

Yakutat borders the Gulf of Alaska to the west, Chugach Census Area, Alaska to the northwest, Hoonah-Angoon Census Area, Alaska to the southeast, Stikine Region, British Columbia to the northeast-east, and both the Yukon Territory and Copper River Census Area, Alaska to the north.

The borough contains part of the protected areas of Chugach National Forest, Glacier Bay National Park, Glacier Bay Wilderness, Tongass National Forest, Wrangell-St. Elias National Park and Preserve, Wrangell-Saint Elias Wilderness, and the Russell Fjord Wilderness.

A unique feature in the borough is Hubbard Glacier, North America's largest tidewater glacier. In 1986 and 2002, the glacier blocked the entrance to Russell Fjord. The resulting Russell Lake rose 83 feet (25.30 m) and 61 feet (18.59 m) until the glacial dam failed. If Russell Lake rises to 135 feet (41.15 m), the water will spill over a pass and flow into the Situk River. That would have a major impact on a world-class fishery. Yakutat would not be affected unless the glacier advances to the townsite, which could take a thousand years. The area's vegetation indicates that water was flowing over the pass until about 1860.

=== Climate ===
Yakutat has a subarctic climate (Dfc) or a subpolar oceanic climate (Cfc) with characteristics such as high precipitation, absence of permafrost, and temperate rainforest vegetation of the climate zone of the Pacific Coast. It rivals Ketchikan as the wettest "city" in the United States, with an annual precipitation (1991−2020 normals) of 140 inches (3.56 m), which falls on 240 days of the year, including 150 inches (4 m) of snow. Almost all of it falls from November through April and it occurs on 64 days annually. (However, with an annual precipitation of 197.8 inches (5.02 m), the city of Whittier receives significantly more annual precipitation than both Yakutat and Ketchikan, which makes it the wettest city in Alaska and the United States, and Yakutat and Ketchikan the second- and third-wettest cities in Alaska, respectively.) September and October represent, on average, the year's primary "rainy season" with an average of over 18 inches (0.46 m) of precipitation for both months. On average, the year's driest period is late April through July, though no month qualifies as a true "dry season." The monthly daily average temperature ranges from 28.6 °F (−1.9 °C) in January to 55.4 °F (13.0 °C) in July. Extreme temperatures have ranged from −24 °F (−31 °C) on December 30, 1964, up to 88 °F (31 °C) on August 15, 2004, though on average, there are typically 3.9 days of minima reaching to or below 1 °F (−17 °C) and only 5.8 days of maxima at or above 70 °F (21 °C)+ highs annually. Unlike in South Central Alaska, a day with a high temperature under 0 °F (−18 °C) has never been recorded.

Climate data for Yakutat, Alaska (Yakutat State Airport), 1991−2020 normals, (Note: Mean monthly maxima and minima (i.e. the highest and lowest temperature readings during an entire month or year) calculated based on data at said location from 1991 to 2020.) extremes 1917−present
Month	Jan	Feb	Mar	Apr	May	Jun	Jul	Aug	Sep	Oct	Nov	Dec	Year
Record high °F (°C)	58 (14)	56 (13)	60 (16)	71 (22)	80 (27)	87 (31)	85 (29)	88 (31)	77 (25)	66 (19)	59 (15)	61 (16)	88 (31)
Mean maximum °F (°C)	44.5 (6.9)	46.1 (7.8)	49.5 (9.7)	59.2 (15.1)	68.0 (20.0)	72.7 (22.6)	71.7 (22.1)	71.5 (21.9)	65.5 (18.6)	56.1 (13.4)	48.4 (9.1)	46.0 (7.8)	77.0 (25.0)
Mean daily maximum °F (°C)	34.8 (1.6)	37.8 (3.2)	40.0 (4.4)	46.9 (8.3)	53.7 (12.1)	58.8 (14.9)	61.6 (16.4)	61.8 (16.6)	56.9 (13.8)	48.9 (9.4)	40.1 (4.5)	36.4 (2.4)	48.1 (9.0)
Daily mean °F (°C)	28.6 (−1.9)	30.6 (−0.8)	32.0 (0.0)	38.6 (3.7)	45.6 (7.6)	51.9 (11.1)	55.4 (13.0)	54.7 (12.6)	49.4 (9.7)	41.9 (5.5)	33.7 (0.9)	30.8 (−0.7)	41.1 (5.1)
Mean daily minimum °F (°C)	22.4 (−5.3)	23.5 (−4.7)	23.8 (−4.6)	30.3 (−0.9)	37.6 (3.1)	45.0 (7.2)	49.2 (9.6)	47.5 (8.6)	41.9 (5.5)	34.8 (1.6)	27.1 (−2.7)	25.1 (−3.8)	34.0 (1.1)
Mean minimum °F (°C)	1.1 (−17.2)	5.8 (−14.6)	7.0 (−13.9)	19.0 (−7.2)	28.2 (−2.1)	35.1 (1.7)	41.5 (5.3)	37.5 (3.1)	29.8 (−1.2)	22.3 (−5.4)	11.2 (−11.6)	7.0 (−13.9)	−3.1 (−19.5)
Record low °F (°C)	−22 (−30)	−20 (−29)	−20 (−29)	3 (−16)	9 (−13)	29 (−2)	35 (2)	29 (−2)	16 (−9)	6 (−14)	−10 (−23)	−24 (−31)	−24 (−31)
Average precipitation inches (mm)	12.41 (315)	10.29 (261)	9.52 (242)	7.94 (202)	7.85 (199)	5.41 (137)	7.63 (194)	13.91 (353)	19.03 (483)	18.88 (480)	13.55 (344)	13.94 (354)	140.36 (3,564)
Average snowfall inches (cm)	28.9 (73)	27.5 (70)	30.4 (77)	7.2 (18)	0.3 (0.76)	0.0 (0.0)	0.0 (0.0)	0.0 (0.0)	0.0 (0.0)	3.4 (8.6)	20.0 (51)	29.6 (75)	147.3 (374)
Average precipitation days (≥ 0.01 inch)	20.7	18.5	18.3	18.6	16.6	16.5	18.8	19.3	21.8	23.0	21.8	23.0	236.9
Average snowy days (≥ 0.1 in)	11.3	10.7	11.9	4.5	0.2	0.0	0.0	0.0	0.1	1.4	8.5	13.5	62.1
Average relative humidity (%)	82.8	83.1	81.2	81.4	82.5	84.5	87.7	88.5	89.0	87.6	84.8	84.1	84.8
Average dew point °F (°C)	20.5 (−6.4)	23.4 (−4.8)	25.5 (−3.6)	30.7 (−0.7)	38.1 (3.4)	45.0 (7.2)	49.8 (9.9)	49.8 (9.9)	44.8 (7.1)	37.0 (2.8)	27.0 (−2.8)	22.8 (−5.1)	34.5 (1.4)
Source: NOAA

== Demographics ==
Historical population
Census	Pop.	Note	%±
1880	300		—
1890	308		2.7%
1900	247		−19.8%
1910	271		9.7%
1920	165		−39.1%
1930	265		60.6%
1940	292		10.2%
1950	298		2.1%
1960	230		−22.8%
1970	190		−17.4%
1980	449		136.3%
1990	534		18.9%
2000	808		51.3%
2010	662		−18.1%
2020	662		0.0%
2025 (est.)	672	▲	1.5%
U.S. Decennial Census; 1990-2000 2010-2020

Yakutat first appeared on the 1880 U.S. Census as an unincorporated Tlingit-Yakutat village. All 300 residents were listed as Tlingit. In 1890, it reported 308 residents including the populations of the native villages at Dry Bay & Lituya (Bay); 300 were listed as Native, 7 Whites and 1 Creole (Mixed Russian & Native). Yakutat formally incorporated in 1948. In 1992, it broke away from the Skagway-Yakutat-Angoon Census Area to form its own borough of Yakutat. It disincorporated at its formation and became a census-designated place (CDP).

=== 2020 census ===
Yakutat City and Borough, Alaska – Racial and ethnic composition Note: the US Census treats Hispanic/Latino as an ethnic category. This table excludes Latinos from the racial categories and assigns them to a separate category. Hispanics/Latinos may be of any race.
Race / Ethnicity (NH = Non-Hispanic)	Pop 2000	Pop 2010	Pop 2020	% 2000	% 2010	% 2020
White alone (NH)	406	268	248	50.25%	40.48%	37.46%
Black or African American alone (NH)	1	2	2	0.12%	0.30%	0.30%
Native American or Alaska Native alone (NH)	317	235	250	39.23%	35.50%	37.76%
Asian alone (NH)	10	27	32	1.24%	4.08%	4.83%
Native Hawaiian or Pacific Islander alone (NH)	6	12	1	0.74%	1.81%	0.15%
Other race alone (NH)	0	0	0	0.00%	0.00%	0.00%
Mixed race or Multiracial (NH)	62	101	100	7.67%	15.26%	15.11%
Hispanic or Latino (any race)	6	17	29	0.74%	2.57%	4.38%
Total	808	662	662	100.00%	100.00%	100.00%

As of the 2020 census, the county had a population of 662. The median age was 44.8 years. 19.3% of residents were under the age of 18 and 18.3% of residents were 65 years of age or older. For every 100 females there were 131.5 males, and for every 100 females age 18 and over there were 137.3 males age 18 and over.

The racial makeup of the county was 37.6% White, 0.6% Black or African American, 38.5% American Indian and Alaska Native, 4.8% Asian, 0.2% Native Hawaiian and Pacific Islander, 0.5% from some other race, and 17.8% from two or more races. Hispanic or Latino residents of any race comprised 4.4% of the population.

0.0% of residents lived in urban areas, while 100.0% lived in rural areas.

There were 265 households in the county, of which 28.7% had children under the age of 18 living with them and 17.7% had a female householder with no spouse or partner present. About 33.2% of all households were made up of individuals and 12.9% had someone living alone who was 65 years of age or older.

There were 441 housing units, of which 39.9% were vacant. Among occupied housing units, 60.0% were owner-occupied and 40.0% were renter-occupied. The homeowner vacancy rate was 1.9% and the rental vacancy rate was 12.2%.

=== 2010 Census ===
At the 2010 census, there were 662 people, 502 households, and 201 families residing in Yakutat. The racial makeup was 50.37% White, 0.12% Black or African American, 39.60% Native American, 1.24% Asian, 0.74% Pacific Islander, and 7.92% from two or more races. Hispanic or Latino of any race were 0.74% of the population.

It is reported that 5.78% of the population spoke Tlingit at home.

Of the 265 households, 32.8% had children under the age of 18 living with them, 38.5% were married couples living together, 12.1% had a female householder with no husband present, and 40.0% were non-families. 32.1% of households were one person, and 4.9% were one person aged 65 or older. The average household size was 2.59 and the average family size was 3.30.

The population was spread out with 28.1% under the age of 18, 5.3% from 18 to 24, 32.5% from 25 to 44, 28.7% from 45 to 64, and 5.3% 65 or older. The median age was 37 years. For every 100 females there were 145.6 males. For every 100 females age 18 and over, there were 161.7 males.

The median household income was in Yakutat was $46,786, and the median family income was $51,875. Males had a median income of $41,635 versus $25,938 for females. The per capita income was $22,579. About 11.8% of families and 13.5% of the population were below the poverty line, including 22.5% of those under age 18 and 8.3% of those age 65 or over.

=== 2000 Census ===
At the 2000 census, central Yakutat was treated as a census-designated place (CDP), even though census-designated places "are not legally incorporated under the laws of the state in which they are located." The area consisting of about 100 sq mi (260 km^{2}), contained the vast majority of the population of the entire city-borough.

At the 2000 census, there were 680 people, 261 households, and 157 families in the CDP. The population density was 6.8 people per square mile (2.6 people/km^{2}). There were 385 housing units at an average density of 3.9 per square mile (1.5/km^{2}). The racial makeup of the CDP was 41.47% White, 0.15% Black or African American, 47.06% Native American, 1.47% Asian, 0.88% Pacific Islander, and 8.97% from two or more races. Hispanic or Latino of any race were 0.88% of the population.

Of the 261 households, 33.3% had children under the age of 18 living with them, 38.7% were married couples living together, 12.3% had a female householder with no husband present, and 39.5% were non-families. 31.4% of households were one person, and 5.0% were one person aged 65 or older. The average household size was 2.61 and the average family size was 3.30.

The age distribution was 31.0% under the age of 18, 6.2% from 18 to 24, 31.3% from 25 to 44, 25.7% from 45 to 64, and 5.7% 65 or older. The median age was 35 years. For every 100 females, there were 117.3 males. For every 100 females age 18 and over, there were 123.3 males.

The median household income was $47,054 and the median family income was $51,875. Males had a median income of $42,404 versus $26,875 for females. The per capita income for the CDP was $21,330. About 11.8% of families and 15.7% of the population were below the poverty line, including 22.5% of those under age 18 and 10.7% of those age 65 or over.

== Notable people ==
- Alexander Andreyevich Baranov (1747–1819), founded a Russian settlement at Yakutat Bay
- Alison Bremner (born 1989), Tlingit contemporary artist born in Yakutat
- Byron Mallott (1943–2020), mayor of Yakutat
- Martin Sensmeier (born 1985), actor
- X'unéi (late 18th-century), chief of the Tlingit

== See also ==
- Yakutat Airport
- 1899 Yakutat Bay earthquakes
