= Megatsunami =

Very large wave created by a large, sudden displacement of material into a body of water

Diagram of the 1958 Lituya Bay megatsunami, which proved the existence of megatsunamis

A megatsunami is an extremely large wave created by a substantial and sudden displacement of material into a body of water.

Megatsunamis have different features from ordinary tsunamis. Ordinary tsunamis are caused by underwater tectonic activity (movement of the earth's plates) and therefore occur along plate boundaries and as a result of earthquakes and the subsequent rise or fall in the sea floor that displaces a volume of water. Ordinary tsunamis exhibit shallow waves in the deep waters of the open ocean that increase dramatically in height upon approaching land to a maximum run-up height of around 30 metres (100 ft) in the cases of the most powerful earthquakes. By contrast, megatsunamis occur when a large amount of material suddenly falls into water or anywhere near water (such as via a landslide, meteor impact, or volcanic eruption). They can have extremely large initial wave heights in the hundreds of metres, far beyond the height of any ordinary tsunami. These giant wave heights occur because the water is "splashed" upwards and outwards by the displacement.

Examples of modern megatsunamis include the one associated with the 1883 eruption of Krakatoa (volcanic eruption), the 1958 Lituya Bay earthquake and megatsunami (a landslide which resulted in wave runup reaching 524.6 metres (1,721 ft)), the 1963 Vajont Dam landslide (caused by human activity destabilizing sides of valley), and the 10 August 2025 Tracy Arm landslide and tsunami, which reached a height of 481 metres (1,578 ft). Prehistoric examples include the Storegga Slide (landslide), and the Chicxulub, Chesapeake Bay, and Eltanin meteor impacts.

== Overview ==
A megatsunami is a tsunami with an initial wave amplitude (height) measured in many tens or hundreds of metres. The term "megatsunami" has been defined by media and has no precise definition, although it is commonly taken to refer to tsunamis over 100 metres (328 ft) high. A megatsunami is a separate class of event from an ordinary tsunami and is caused by different physical mechanisms.

Normal tsunamis result from displacement of the sea floor due to movements in the Earth's crust (plate tectonics). Powerful earthquakes may cause the sea floor to displace vertically on the order of tens of metres, which in turn displaces the water column above and leads to the formation of a tsunami. Ordinary tsunamis have a small wave height offshore and generally pass unnoticed at sea, forming only a slight swell on the order of 30 centimetres (12 in) above the normal sea surface. In deep water it is possible that a tsunami could pass beneath a ship without the crew of the vessel noticing. As it approaches land, the wave height of an ordinary tsunami increases dramatically as the sea floor slopes upward and the base of the wave pushes the water column above it upwards. Ordinary tsunamis, even those associated with the most powerful strike-slip earthquakes, typically do not reach heights in excess of 30 m (100 ft).

By contrast, megatsunamis are caused by landslides and massive earthquakes that displace large volumes of water, resulting in waves that may exceed the height of an ordinary tsunami by tens or even hundreds of metres. Underwater earthquakes or volcanic eruptions do not normally generate megatsunamis, but landslides next to bodies of water resulting from earthquakes or volcanic eruptions can, since they cause a much larger amount of water displacement. If the landslide or impact occurs in a limited body of water, as happened in Lituya Bay (1958) and at the Vajont Dam (1963), then the water may be unable to disperse and one or more exceedingly large waves may result.

Submarine landslides can pose a significant hazard when they cause a tsunami. Although a variety of different types of landslides can cause tsunami, all the resulting tsunami have similar features such as large run-ups close to the tsunami, but quicker attenuation compared to tsunami caused by earthquakes. An example of this was the 17 July 1998 Papua New Guinean landslide tsunami, in which waves up to 15 metres (49 ft) high struck a 20-kilometre (12.4-mile) section of the coast, killing 2,200 people, yet at greater distances the tsunami was not a major hazard. This is due to the comparatively small source area of most landslide tsunami (relative to the area affected by large earthquakes) which causes the generation of waves with shorter wavelengths. These waves are greatly affected by coastal amplification (which amplifies the local effect) and radial damping (which reduces the distal effect).

The size of landslide-generated tsunamis depends both on the geological details of the landslide (such as its Froude number) and also on assumptions about the hydrodynamics of the model used to simulate tsunami generation, thus they have a large margin of uncertainty. Generally, landslide-induced tsunamis decay more quickly with distance than earthquake-induced tsunamis, as the former, often having a dipole structure at the source, tend to spread out radially and have a shorter wavelength (the rate at which a wave loses energy is inversely proportional to its wavelength, so the longer the wavelength of a wave, the more slowly it loses energy) while the latter disperses little as it propagates away perpendicularly to the source fault. Testing whether a given tsunami model is correct is complicated by the rarity of giant collapses.

Recent findings show that the nature of a tsunami depends upon the volume, velocity, initial acceleration, length, and thickness of the landslide generating it. Volume and initial acceleration are the key factors which determine whether a landslide will form a tsunami. A sudden deceleration of the landslide may also result in larger waves. The length of the slide influences both the wavelength and the maximum wave height. Travel time or run-out distance of the slide also will influence the resulting tsunami wavelength. In most cases, submarine landslides are noticeably subcritical, that is, the Froude number (the ratio of slide speed to wave propagation) is significantly less than one. This suggests that the tsunami will move away from the wave-generating slide, preventing the buildup of the wave. Failures in shallow waters tend to produce larger tsunamis because the wave is more critical as the speed of propagation is less. Furthermore, shallower waters are generally closer to the coast, meaning that there is less radial damping by the time the tsunami reaches the shore. Conversely tsunamis triggered by earthquakes are more critical when the seabed displacement occurs in the deep ocean, as the first wave (which is less affected by depth) has a shorter wavelength and is enlarged when travelling from deeper to shallower waters.

Determining a height range typical of megatsunamis is a complex and scientifically debated topic. This complexity is increased by the two different heights often reported for tsunamis – the height of the wave itself in open water and the height to which it surges when it encounters land. Depending upon the locale, this second height, the "run-up height," can be several times larger than the wave's height just before it reaches shore. While there is no minimum or average height classification for megatsunamis that the scientific community broadly accepts, the limited number of observed megatsunami events in recent history have all had run-up heights that exceeded 100 metres (300 ft). The megatsunami in Spirit Lake in Washington in the United States generated by the 1980 eruption of Mount St. Helens reached 260 metres (853 ft), while the tallest megatsunami ever recorded (in Lituya Bay in 1958) reached a run-up height of 520 metres (1,720 ft). It is also possible that much larger megatsunamis occurred in prehistory; researchers analyzing the geological structures left behind by prehistoric asteroid impacts have suggested that these events could have resulted in megatsunamis that exceeded 1,500 metres (4,900 ft) in height.

== Recognition of the concept of megatsunami ==
Before the 1950s, scientists had theorized that tsunamis orders of magnitude larger than those observed with earthquakes could have occurred as a result of ancient geological processes, but no concrete evidence of the existence of these "monster waves" had yet been gathered. Geologists searching for oil in Alaska in 1953 observed that in Lituya Bay, mature tree growth did not extend to the shoreline as it did in many other bays in the region. Rather, there was a band of younger trees closer to the shore. Forestry workers, glaciologists, and geographers call the boundary between these bands a trim line. Trees just above the trim line showed severe scarring on their seaward side, while those from below the trim line did not. This indicated that a large force had impacted all of the elder trees above the trim line, and presumably had killed off all the trees below it. Based on this evidence, the scientists hypothesized that there had been an unusually large wave or waves in the deep inlet. Because this is a recently deglaciated fjord with steep slopes and crossed by a major fault (the Fairweather Fault), one possibility was that this wave was a landslide-generated tsunami.

On 9 July 1958, a 7.8 M_{w} strike-slip earthquake in Southeast Alaska caused 80,000,000 metric tons (90,000,000 short tons) of rock and ice to drop into the deep water at the head of Lituya Bay. The block fell almost vertically and hit the water with sufficient force to create a wave that surged up the opposite side of the head of the bay to a height of 520 metres (1,710 feet), and was still many tens of metres high further down the bay when it carried eyewitnesses Howard Ulrich and his son Howard Jr. over the trees in their fishing boat. They were washed back into the bay and both survived.

== Analysis of mechanism ==
The mechanism giving rise to megatsunamis was analysed for the Lituya Bay event in a study presented at the Tsunami Society in 1999; this model was considerably developed and modified by a second study in 2010.

Although the earthquake which caused the megatsunami was considered very energetic, it was determined that it could not have been the sole contributor based on the measured height of the wave. Neither water drainage from a lake, nor a landslide, nor the force of the earthquake itself were sufficient to create a megatsunami of the size observed, although all of these may have been contributing factors.

Instead, the megatsunami was caused by a combination of events in quick succession. The primary event occurred in the form of a large and sudden impulsive impact when about 40 million cubic yards of rock several hundred metres above the bay was fractured by the earthquake, and fell "practically as a monolithic unit" down the almost-vertical slope and into the bay. The rockfall also caused air to be "dragged along" due to viscosity effects, which added to the volume of displacement, and further impacted the sediment on the floor of the bay, creating a large crater. The study concluded that:

The giant wave runup of 1,720 feet (524 m) at the head of the Bay and the subsequent huge wave along the main body of Lituya Bay which occurred on July 9, 1958, were caused primarily by an enormous subaerial rockfall into Gilbert Inlet at the head of Lituya Bay, triggered by dynamic earthquake ground motions along the Fairweather Fault.

The large monolithic mass of rock struck the sediments at bottom of Gilbert Inlet at the head of the bay with great force. The impact created a large crater and displaced and folded recent and Tertiary deposits and sedimentary layers to an unknown depth. The displaced water and the displacement and folding of the sediments broke and uplifted 1,300 feet of ice along the entire front face of the Lituya Glacier at the north end of Gilbert Inlet. Also, the impact and the sediment displacement by the rockfall resulted in an air bubble and in water splashing action that reached the 1,720-foot (524 m) elevation on the other side of the head of Gilbert Inlet. The same rockfall impact, in combination with the strong ground movements, the net vertical crustal uplift of about 3.5 feet, and an overall tilting seaward of the entire crustal block on which Lituya Bay was situated, generated the giant solitary gravity wave which swept the main body of the bay.

This was the most likely scenario of the event – the "PC model" that was adopted for subsequent mathematical modeling studies with source dimensions and parameters provided as input. Subsequent mathematical modeling at the Los Alamos National Laboratory (Mader, 1999, Mader & Gittings, 2002) supported the proposed mechanism and indicated that there was indeed sufficient volume of water and an adequately deep layer of sediments in the Lituya Bay inlet to account for the giant wave runup and the subsequent inundation. The modeling reproduced the documented physical observations of runup.

A 2010 model that examined the amount of infill on the floor of the bay, which was many times larger than that of the rockfall alone, and also the energy and height of the waves, and the accounts given by eyewitnesses, concluded that there had been a "dual slide" involving a rockfall, which also triggered a release of 5 to 10 times its volume of sediment trapped by the adjacent Lituya Glacier, as an almost immediate and many times larger second slide, a ratio comparable with other events where this "dual slide" effect is known to have happened.

== Examples ==
=== Prehistoric ===
- An astronomical object between 37 and 58 kilometres (23 and 36 mi) wide traveling at 20 kilometres (12.4 mi) per second struck the Earth 3.26 billion years ago east of what is now Johannesburg, South Africa, near South Africa's border with Eswatini, in what was then an Archean ocean that covered most of the planet, creating a crater about 500 kilometres (310 mi) wide. The impact generated a megatsunami that probably extended to a depth of thousands of metres beneath the surface of the ocean and probably rose to the height of a skyscraper when it reached shorelines. The resultant event created the Barberton Greenstone Belt, which has about 36 spherule layers, implicating up to a few tens of very such a large impacts with similar megatsunami, and about seventy impacts of the same scale of Chicxulub.
- The Alamo impact, evidenced by breccias (known as Alamo breccia) near the town that gives them their name, along with tsunamites, triggered massive megatsunamis..
- A megatsunami in the Barents Sea appears to be strongly linked to the Mjølnir impact event, with waves up 200 m to for resurge flow of water into the crater and tens of metres near the coast.
- The asteroid linked to the extinction of dinosaurs, which created the Chicxulub crater in the Yucatán Peninsula approximately 66 million years ago, would have caused a megatsunami over 100 metres (330 ft) tall. The height of the tsunami was limited due to relatively shallow sea in the area of the impact; had the asteroid struck in the deep sea the megatsunami would have likely been 4.6 kilometres (2.9 mi) tall. Among the mechanisms triggering megatsunamis were the direct impact, shockwaves, returning water in the crater with a new push outward and seismic waves with a magnitude up to ~11. A more recent simulation of the global effects of the Chicxulub megatsunami shows that an initial wave height of 4.5 kilometres (2.8 mi) is triggered by the ejecta curtain; then, after ten minutes by the impact, a 1.5 kilometres (0.9 mi) rim wave megatsunami is produced, with later waves up to 100 metres (330 ft) in height in the Gulf of Mexico, and up to 14 metres (46 ft) in the North Atlantic and South Pacific; the discovery of mega-ripples in Louisiana via seismic imaging data, with average wavelengths of 600 metres (2,000 ft) and average wave heights of 16 metres (52 ft), looks like to confirm it. David Shonting and Cathy Ezrailson propose an "Edgerton effect" mechanism generating the megatsunami, similar to a milk drop falling on water that triggers a crown-shape water column, with a comparable height to the Chicxulub impactor's, that means over 10–12 kilometres (6–7 mi) for the initial seawater forced outward by the explosion and blast waves; then, its collapse triggers megatsunamis changing their height according to the different water depth, raising up to 500 metres (1,600 ft). Furthermore, the initial shock wave via impact triggered seismic waves (M_{w} ~10-11) producing giant landslides and slumping around the region (the largest known event deposits on Earth) with subsequent megatsunamis of various sizes, and seiches of 10 to 100 metres (30 to 300 ft) in Tanis, 3,000 kilometres (1,900 mi) away, part of a vast inland sea at the time and directly triggered via seismic shaking by the impact within a few minutes.
- The Silverpit impact, confirmed in 2025, triggered megatsunamis caused by rim waves, resurge, and the collapse of the water spout.
- During the Messinian (ca. 7.25–ca. 5.3 million years ago) various megatsunamis likely struck the coast of northern Chile.
- Reservoir-induced seismicity at the end of or shortly after the Zanclean Flood (ca. 5.33 million years ago), which rapidly filled the Mediterranean Basin with water from the Atlantic Ocean, created a megatsunami with a height of nearly 100 metres (330 ft) which struck the coast of Spain near what is now Algeciras.
- A megatsunami affected the coast of south–central Chile in the Pliocene as evidenced by the sedimentary record of the Ranquil Formation.
- The Eltanin impact in the southeast Pacific Ocean 2.5 million years ago caused a megatsunami that was over 200 metres (660 ft) high in southern Chile and the Antarctic Peninsula; the wave swept across much of the Pacific Ocean.
- The northern half of the East Molokai Volcano on Molokai in Hawaii suffered a catastrophic collapse about 1.5 million years ago, generating a megatsunami, and now lies as a debris field scattered northward across the ocean bottom, while what remains on the island are the highest sea cliffs in the world. The megatsunami may have reached a height of 610 metres (2,000 ft) near its origin and reached California and Mexico.
- The existence of large scattered boulders in only one of the four marine terraces of Herradura Bay south of the Chilean city of Coquimbo has been interpreted by Roland Paskoff as the result of a mega-tsunami that occurred in the Middle Pleistocene.
- In Hawaii, a megatsunami at least 400 metres (1,312 ft) in height deposited marine sediments at a modern-day elevation of 326 metres (1,070 ft) – 375 to 425 metres (1,230 to 1,394 ft) above sea level at the time the wave struck – on Lanai about 105,000 years ago. The tsunami also deposited such sediments at an elevation of 60 to 80 metres (197 to 262 ft) on Oahu, Molokai, Maui, and the island of Hawaii.
- The collapse of the ancestral Mount Amarelo on Fogo in the Cape Verde Islands about 73,000 years ago triggered a megatsunami which struck Santiago, 55 kilometres (34 mi; 30 nmi) away, with a height of 170 to 240 metres (558 to 787 ft) and a run-up height of over 270 metres (886 ft). The wave swept 770-tonne (760-long-ton; 850-short-ton) boulders 600 metres (2,000 ft) inland and deposited them 200 metres (656 ft) above sea level
- A major collapse of the western edge of the Lake Tahoe basin, a landslide with a volume of 12.5 cubic kilometres (3.0 cu mi) which formed McKinney Bay between 21,000 and 12,000 years ago, generated megatsunamis/seiche waves with an initial height of probably about 100 m (330 ft) and caused the lake's water to slosh back and forth for days. Much of the water in the megatsunamis washed over the lake's outlet at what is now Tahoe City, California, and flooded down the Truckee River, carrying house-sized boulders as far downstream as the California-Nevada border at what is now Verdi, California.
- In the North Sea, the Storegga Slide caused a megatsunami approximately 8,200 years ago. It is estimated to have completely flooded the remainder of Doggerland.
- Around 6370 BCE, a 25-cubic-kilometre (6 cu mi) landslide on the eastern slope of Mount Etna in Sicily into the Mediterranean Sea triggered a megatsunami in the Eastern Mediterranean with an initial wave height along the eastern coast of Sicily of 40 metres (131 ft). It struck the Neolithic village of Atlit Yam off the coast of Israel with a height of 2.5 metres (8 ft 2 in), prompting the village's abandonment.
- Around 5650 B.C., a landslide in Greenland created a megatsunami with a run-up height on Alluttoq Island of 41 to 66 metres (135 to 217 ft).
- Around 5350 B.C., a landslide in Greenland created a megatsunami with a run-up height on Alluttoq Island of 45 to 70 metres (148 to 230 ft).

=== Historic ===
==== c. 2000-2500 BC: Réunion ====
- A giant landslide on Réunion island, to the east of Madagascar, from the eastern flank of Piton de la Fournaise, appears to have triggered a megatsunami with heights of tens of metres, probated by deposits at Mauritius, and coral blocks and reef up a height of 40 metres.

==== c. 1627-1600 BC: Santorini ====
- The Thera volcano erupted, the force of the eruption causing megatsunamis which affected the whole Aegean Sea and the eastern Mediterranean Sea. Deposits have been found in Turkey and Crete. They were probably triggered by the caldera collapse and pyroclastic flows. In Çeşme, the first evidence of human remains linked to megatsunamis has been discovered.

==== c. 1100 BC: Lake Crescent ====
- An earthquake generated the 7,200,000-cubic-metre (9,400,000 cu yd) Sledgehammer Point Rockslide, which fell from Mount Storm King in what is now Washington in the United States and entered waters at least 140 metres (459 ft) deep in Lake Crescent, generating a megatsunami with an estimated maximum run-up height of 82 to 104 metres (269 to 341 ft).

=== Modern ===
==== 1674: Ambon Island, Banda Sea ====
On 17 February 1674, between 19:30 and 20:00 local time, an earthquake struck the Maluku Islands. Ambon Island received run-up heights of 100 metres (328 ft), making the wave far too large to be caused by the quake itself. Instead, it was probably the result of an underwater landslide triggered by the earthquake. The quake and tsunami killed 2,347 people.

==== 1731: Storfjorden, Norway ====
At 10:00 p.m. on 8 January 1731, a landslide with a volume of possibly 6,000,000 cubic metres (7,800,000 cu yd) fell from the mountain Skafjell from a height of 500 metres (1,640 ft) into the Storfjorden opposite Stranda, Norway. The slide generated a megatsunami 30 metres (100 ft) in height that struck Stranda, flooding the area for 100 metres (330 ft) inland and destroying the church and all but two boathouses, as well as many boats. Damaging waves struck as far away as Ørskog. The waves killed 17 people.

==== 1741: Oshima-Ōshima, Sea of Japan ====
An eruption of Oshima-Ōshima occurred that lasted from 18 August 1741 to 1 May 1742. On 29 August 1741, a devastating tsunami occurred. It killed at least 1,467 people along a 120-kilometre (75 mi) section of the coast, excluding native residents whose deaths were not recorded. Wave heights for Gankakezawa have been estimated at 34 metres (112 ft) based on oral histories, while an estimate of 13 metres (43 ft) is derived from written records. At Sado Island, over 350 kilometres (217 mi; 189 nmi) away, a wave height of 2 to 5 metres (6 ft 7 in to 16 ft 5 in) has been estimated based on descriptions of the damage, while oral records suggest a height of 8 metres (26 ft). Wave heights have been estimated at 3 to 4 metres (9.8 to 13.1 ft) even as far away as the Korean Peninsula. There is still no consensus in the debate as to what caused it but much evidence points to a landslide and debris avalanche along the flank of the volcano. An alternative hypothesis holds that an earthquake caused the tsunami. The event reduced the elevation of the peak of Hishiyama from 850 to 722 metres (2,789 to 2,369 ft). An estimated 2.4-cubic-kilometre (0.58 cu mi) section of the volcano collapsed onto the seafloor north of the island; the collapse was similar in size to the 2.3-cubic-kilometre (0.55 cu mi) collapse which occurred during the 1980 eruption of Mount St. Helens.

==== 1756: Langfjorden, Norway ====
Just before 8:00 p.m. on 22 February 1756, a landslide with a volume of 12,000,000 to 15,000,000 cubic metres (16,000,000 to 20,000,000 cu yd) travelled at high speed from a height of 400 metres (1,300 ft) on the side of the mountain Tjellafjellet into the Langfjorden about 1 kilometre (0.6 mi) west of Tjelle, Norway, between Tjelle and Gramsgrø. The slide generated three megatsunamis in the Langfjorden and the Eresfjorden with heights of 40 to 50 metres (130 to 160 ft). The waves flooded the shore for 200 metres (660 ft) inland in some areas, destroying farms and other inhabited areas. Damaging waves struck as far away as Veøya, 25 kilometres (16 mi) from the landslide – where they washed inland 20 metres (66 ft) above normal flood levels – and Gjermundnes, 40 kilometres (25 mi) from the slide. The waves killed 32 people and destroyed 168 buildings, 196 boats, large amounts of forest, and roads and boat landings.

==== 1792: Mount Unzen, Japan ====
On 21 May 1792, a flank of the Mayamaya dome of Mount Unzen collapsed after two large earthquakes. This had been preceded by a series of earthquakes coming from the mountain, beginning near the end of 1791. Initial wave heights were 100 metres (330 ft), but when they hit the other side of Ariake Bay, they were only 10 to 20 metres (33 to 66 ft) in height, though one location received 57-metre (187 ft) waves due to seafloor topography. The waves bounced back to Shimabara, which, when they hit, accounted for about half of the tsunami's victims. According to estimates, 10,000 people were killed by the tsunami, and a further 5,000 were killed by the landslide. As of 2011, it was the deadliest known volcanic event in Japan.

==== 1853–1854: Lituya Bay, Alaska ====
Sometime between August 1853 and May 1854, a megatsunami occurred in Lituya Bay in what was then Russian America. Studies of Lituya Bay between 1948 and 1953 first identified the event, which probably occurred because of a large landslide on the south shore of the bay near Mudslide Creek. The wave had a maximum run-up height of 120 metres (394 ft), flooding the coast of the bay up to 230 metres (750 ft) inland.

==== 1874: Lituya Bay, Alaska ====
A study of Lituya Bay in 1953 concluded that sometime around 1874, perhaps in May 1874, another megatsunami occurred in Lituya Bay in Alaska. Probably occurring because of a large landslide on the south shore of the bay in the Mudslide Creek Valley, the wave had a maximum run-up height of 24 metres (80 ft), flooding the coast of the bay up to 640 metres (2,100 ft) inland.

==== 1883: Krakatoa, Sunda Strait ====
The massive explosion of Krakatoa created pyroclastic flows which generated megatsunamis when they hit the waters of the Sunda Strait on 27 August 1883. The waves reached heights of up to 24 metres (79 feet) along the south coast of Sumatra and up to 42 metres (138 feet) along the west coast of Java. The tsunamis were powerful enough to kill over 30,000 people, and their effect was such that an area of land in Banten had its human settlements wiped out, and they never repopulated. (This area rewilded and was later declared a national park.) The steamship Berouw, a colonial gunboat, was flung over a mile (1.6 km) inland on Sumatra by the wave, killing its entire crew. Two thirds of the island collapsed into the sea after the event. Groups of human skeletons were found floating on pumice numerous times, up to a year after the event. The eruption also generated what is often called the loudest sound in history, which was heard 4,800 kilometres (3,000 mi; 2,600 nmi) away on Rodrigues in the Indian Ocean.

==== 1905: Lovatnet, Norway ====
On 15 January 1905, a landslide on the slope of the mountain Ramnefjellet with a volume of 350,000 cubic metres (460,000 cu yd) fell from a height of 500 metres (1,600 ft) into the southern end of the lake Lovatnet in Norway, generating three megatsunamis of up to 40.5 metres (133 ft) in height. The waves destroyed the villages of Bødal and Nesdal near the southern end of the lake, killing 61 people – half their combined population – and 261 farm animals and destroying 60 houses, all the local boathouses, and 70 to 80 boats, one of which – the tourist boat Lodalen – was thrown 300 metres (1,000 ft) inland by the last wave and wrecked. At the northern end of the 11.7-kilometre (7.3 mi) long lake, a wave measured at almost 6 metres (20 ft) destroyed a bridge.

==== 1905: Disenchantment Bay, Alaska ====
On 4 July 1905, an overhanging glacier – since known as the Fallen Glacier – broke loose, slid out of its valley, and fell 300 metres (1,000 ft) down a steep slope into Disenchantment Bay in Alaska, clearing vegetation along a path 0.8 kilometres (0.5 mi) wide. When it entered the water, it generated a megatsunami which broke tree branches 34 metres (110 ft) above ground level 0.8 kilometres (0.5 mi) away. The wave killed vegetation to a height of 20 metres (65 ft) at a distance of 5 kilometres (3 mi) from the landslide, and it reached heights of 15 to 35 metres (50 to 115 ft) at different locations on the coast of Haenke Island. At a distance of 24 kilometres (15 mi) from the slide, observers at Russell Fjord reported a series of large waves that caused the water level to rise and fall 5 to 6 metres (15 to 20 ft) for a half-hour.

==== 1934: Tafjorden, Norway ====
On 7 April 1934, a landslide on the slope of the mountain Langhamaren with a volume of 3,000,000 cubic metres (3,900,000 cu yd) fell from a height of about 730 metres (2,395 ft) into the Tafjorden in Norway, generating three megatsunamis, the last and largest of which reached a height of between 62 and 63.5 metres (203 and 208 ft) on the opposite shore. Large waves struck Tafjord and Fjørå. At Tafjord, the last and largest wave was 17 metres (56 ft) tall and struck at an estimated speed of 160 kilometres per hour (100 mph), flooding the town for 300 metres (328 yd) inland and killing 23 people. At Fjørå, waves reached 13 metres (43 ft), destroyed buildings, removed all soil, and killed 17 people. Damaging waves struck as far as 50 kilometres (31 mi) away, and waves were detected at a distance of 100 kilometres (62 mi) from the landslide. One survivor suffered serious injuries requiring hospitalization.

==== 1936: Lovatnet, Norway ====
On 13 September 1936, a landslide on the slope of the mountain Ramnefjellet with a volume of 1,000,000 cubic metres (1,300,000 cu yd) fell from a height of 800 metres (3,000 ft) into the southern end of the lake Lovatnet in Norway, generating three megatsunamis, the largest of which reached a height of 74 metres (243 ft). The waves destroyed all farms at Bødal and most farms at Nesdal – completely washing away 16 farms – as well as 100 houses, bridges, a power station, a workshop, a sawmill, several grain mills, a restaurant, a schoolhouse, and all boats on the lake. A 12.6-metre (41 ft) wave struck the southern end of the 11.7-kilometre (7.3 mi) long lake and caused damaging flooding in the Loelva River, the lake's northern outlet. The waves killed 74 people and severely injured 11.

==== 1936: Lituya Bay, Alaska ====
On 27 October 1936, a megatsunami occurred in Lituya Bay in Alaska with a maximum run-up height of 150 metres (490 ft) in Crillon Inlet at the head of the bay. The four eyewitnesses to the wave in Lituya Bay itself all survived and described it as between 30 and 76 metres (100 and 250 ft) high. The maximum inundation distance was 610 metres (2,000 ft) inland along the north shore of the bay. The cause of the megatsunami remains unclear, but may have been a submarine landslide.

==== 1958: Lituya Bay, Alaska, US ====
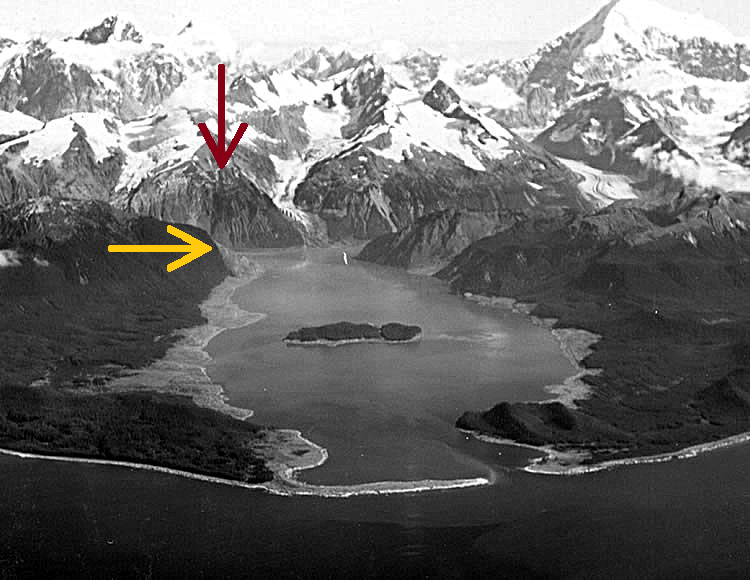
Damage from the 1958 Lituya Bay, Alaska earthquake and megatsunami can be seen in this oblique aerial photograph of Lituya Bay, Alaska as the lighter areas at the shore where trees have been stripped away. The red arrow shows the location of the landslide, and the yellow arrow shows the location of the high point of the wave sweeping over the headland.

On 9 July 1958, a giant landslide at the head of Lituya Bay in Alaska, caused by an earthquake, generated a wave that washed out trees to a maximum elevation of 520 metres (1,710 ft) at the entrance of Gilbert Inlet. The wave surged over the headland, stripping trees and soil down to bedrock, and surged along the fjord which forms Lituya Bay, destroying two fishing boats anchored there and killing two people. This was the highest wave of any kind ever recorded. The subsequent study of this event led to the establishment of the term "megatsunami," to distinguish it from ordinary tsunamis.

==== 1963: Vajont Dam, Italy ====
On 9 October 1963, a landslide above Vajont Dam in Italy produced a 250 m (820 ft) surge that overtopped the dam and destroyed the villages of Longarone, Pirago, Rivalta, Villanova, and Faè, killing nearly 2,000 people. This is currently the only known example of a megatsunami that was indirectly caused by human activities.

==== 1964: Valdez Arm, Alaska ====
On 27 March 1964, the 1964 Alaska earthquake triggered a landslide that generated a megatsunami which reached a height of 70 metres (230 ft) in the Valdez Arm of Prince William Sound in Southcentral Alaska.

==== 1980: Spirit Lake, Washington, US ====
On 18 May 1980, the upper 400 metres (1,300 ft) of Mount St. Helens collapsed, creating a landslide. This released the pressure on the magma trapped beneath the summit bulge which exploded as a lateral blast, which then released the pressure on the magma chamber and resulted in a plinian eruption.

One lobe of the avalanche surged onto Spirit Lake, causing a megatsunami which pushed the lake waters in a series of surges, which reached a maximum height of 260 metres (850 ft) above the pre-eruption water level (about 975 m (3,199 ft) ASL). Above the upper limit of the tsunami, trees lie where they were knocked down by the pyroclastic surge; below the limit, the fallen trees and the surge deposits were removed by the megatsunami and deposited in Spirit Lake.

==== 2000: Paatuut, Greenland ====
On 21 November 2000, a landslide composed of 90,000,000 cubic metres (120,000,000 cu yd) of rock with a mass of 260,000,000 tons fell from an elevation of 1,000 to 1,400 metres (3,300 to 4,600 ft) at Paatuut on the Nuussuaq Peninsula on the west coast of Greenland, reaching a speed of 140 kilometres per hour (87 mph). About 30,000,000 cubic metres (39,000,000 cu yd) of material with a mass of 87,000,000 tons entered Sullorsuaq Strait (known in Danish as Vaigat Strait), generating a megatsunami. The wave had a run-up height of 50 metres (164 ft) near the landslide and 28 metres (92 ft) at Qullissat, the site of an abandoned settlement across the strait on Disko Island, 20 kilometres (11 nmi; 12 mi) away, where it inundated the coast as far as 100 metres (328 ft) inland. Refracted energy from the tsunami created a wave that destroyed boats at the closest populated village, Saqqaq, on the southwestern coast of the Nuussuaq Peninsula 40 kilometres (25 mi) from the landslide.

==== 2007: Chehalis Lake, British Columbia, Canada ====
On 4 December 2007, a landslide composed of 3,000,000 cubic metres (3,900,000 cu yd) of rock and debris fell from an elevation of 550 metres (1,804 ft) on the slope of Mount Orrock on the western short of Chehalis Lake. The landslide entered the 175-metre (574 ft) deep lake, generating a megatsunami with a run-up height of 37.8 metres (124 ft) on the opposite shore and 6.3 metres (21 ft) at the lake's exit point 7.5 kilometres (4.7 mi) away to the south. The wave then continued down the Chehalis River for about 15 kilometres (9.3 mi).

==== 2015: Taan Fiord, Alaska, US ====
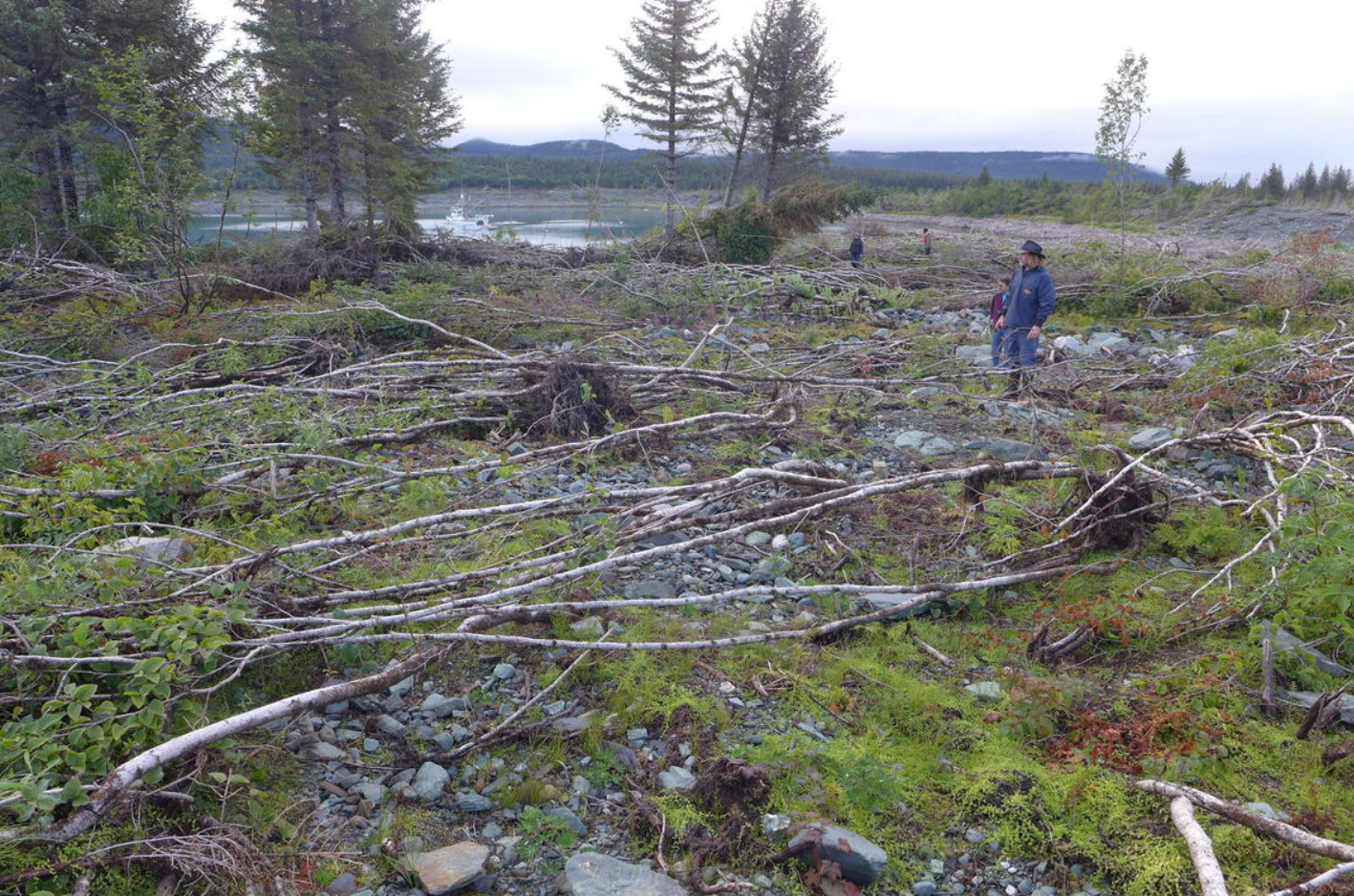
On 9 August 2016, United States Geological Survey scientists survey run-up damage from the 17 October 2015 megatsunami in Taan Fiord. Based on visible damage to trees that remained standing, they estimated run-up heights in this area of 5 metres (16.4 ft).

At 8:19 p.m. Alaska Daylight Time on 17 October 2015, the side of a mountain collapsed at the head of Taan Fiord, a finger of Icy Bay in Alaska. Some of the resulting landslide came to rest on the toe of Tyndall Glacier, but about 180,000,000 short tons (161,000,000 long tons; 163,000,000 metric tons) of rock with a volume of about 50,000,000 cubic metres (65,400,000 cu yd) fell into the fjord. The landslide generated a megatsunami with an initial height of about 100 metres (330 feet) that struck the opposite shore of the fjord, with a run-up height there of 193 metres (633 feet).

Over the next 12 minutes, the wave traveled down the fjord at a speed of up to 97 kilometres per hour (60 mph), with run-up heights of over 100 metres (328 feet) in the upper fjord to between 30 and 100 metres (98 and 330 feet) or more in its middle section, and 20 metres (66 feet) or more at its mouth. Still probably 12 metres (40 feet) tall when it entered Icy Bay, the tsunami inundated parts of Icy Bay's shoreline with run-ups of 4 to 5 metres (13 to 16 feet) before dissipating into insignificance at distances of 5 kilometres (3.1 mi) from the mouth of Taan Fiord, although the wave was detected 140 kilometres (87 miles) away.

Occurring in an uninhabited area, the event was unwitnessed, and several hours passed before the signature of the landslide was noticed on seismographs at Columbia University in New York City.

==== 2017: Karrat Fjord, Greenland ====
On 17 June 2017, 35,000,000 to 58,000,000 cubic metres (46,000,000 to 76,000,000 cu yd) of rock on the mountain Ummiammakku fell from an elevation of roughly 1,000 metres (3,280 ft) into the waters of the Karrat Fjord. The event was thought to be caused by melting ice that destabilised the rock. It registered as a magnitude 4.1 earthquake and created a 100-metre (328 ft) wave. The settlement of Nuugaatsiaq, 32 kilometres (20 mi) away, saw run-up heights of 9 metres (30 ft). Eleven buildings were swept into the sea, four people died, and 170 residents of Nuugaatsiaq and Illorsuit were evacuated because of a danger of additional landslides and waves. The tsunami was noted at settlements as far as 100 kilometres (62 mi) away.

==== 2020: Elliot Creek, British Columbia, Canada ====
On 28 November 2020, unseasonably heavy rainfall triggered a landslide of 18,000,000 m^{3} (24,000,000 cu yd) into a glacial lake at the head of Elliot Creek. The sudden displacement of water generated a 100 m (330 ft) high megatsunami that cascaded down Elliot Creek and the Southgate River to the head of Bute Inlet, covering a total distance of over 60 km (37 mi). The event generated a magnitude 5.0 earthquake and destroyed over 8.5 km (5.3 mi) of salmon habitat along Elliot Creek. The slope had been gradually weakened over time by the retreat of West Grenville Glacier, causing the weight distribution in this area to change.

==== 2023: Dickson Fjord, Greenland ====
On 16 September 2023 a large landslide originating 300–400 m (980–1,310 ft) above sea level entered Dickson Fjord, triggering a tsunami exceeding 200 m (660 ft) in run-up. Run-up of 60 m (200 ft) was observed along a 10 km (6.2 mi) stretch of coast. There was no major damage and there were no casualties. The tsunami was followed by a seiche that lasted for a week. The seiche produced a nine-day disturbance recorded by seismic instruments globally.

==== 2025: Tracy Arm, Alaska ====
On 10 August 2025, a large landslide consisting of at least 64,000,000 m^{3} (84,000,000 cu yd) of material occurred near the terminus of South Sawyer Glacier in Tracy Arm, a fjord in Southeast Alaska, following days of microseismicity. A 470-to-500-metre (1,542-to-1,640-foot) run-up occurred on the shore of Tracy Arm opposite the landslide and a run-up of at least 30 metres (98 ft) took place at nearby Sawyer Island in Tracy Arm. At the mouth of Tracy Arm, waves estimated at 3 to 5 metres (10 to 15 ft) in height struck Harbour Island, where water rose at least 25 feet (7.6 m) above the high tide line. Tsunami waves of up to 36 centimetres (14 in) reached a gauge 80 miles (129 km) from the landslide at Juneau, Alaska. According to the Alaska Earthquake Center, the event had a magnitude of M_{w}5.4.

== Potential future megatsunamis ==
In a BBC television documentary broadcast in 2000, experts said that they thought that a landslide on a volcanic ocean island is the most likely future cause of a megatsunami. The size and power of a wave generated by such means could produce devastating effects, travelling across oceans and inundating up to 25 kilometres (16 mi) inland from the coast. This research was later found to be flawed. The documentary was produced before the experts' scientific paper was published and before responses were given by other geologists. There have been megatsunamis in the past, and future megatsunamis are possible but current geological consensus is that these are only local. A megatsunami in the Canary Islands would diminish to a normal tsunami by the time it reached the continents. Also, the current consensus for La Palma is that the region conjectured to collapse is too small and too geologically stable to do so in the next 10,000 years, although there is evidence for past megatsunamis local to the Canary Islands thousands of years ago. Similar remarks apply to the suggestion of a megatsunami in Hawaii.

=== Alaska ===
Alaska is a region especially prone to megatsunamis because of its steep mountains, narrow fjords and frequent earthquakes; many are listed in this article.

=== British Columbia ===
Some geologists consider an unstable rock face at Mount Breakenridge, above the north end of the giant fresh-water fjord of Harrison Lake in the Fraser Valley of southwestern British Columbia, Canada, to be unstable enough to collapse into the lake, generating a megatsunami that might destroy the town of Harrison Hot Springs (located at its south end).

=== Canary Islands ===
Geologists Dr. Simon Day and Dr. Steven Neal Ward consider that a megatsunami could be generated during an eruption of Cumbre Vieja on the volcanic ocean island of La Palma, in the Canary Islands, Spain. Day and Ward hypothesize that if such an eruption causes the western flank to fail, a megatsunami could be generated.

In 1949, an eruption occurred at three of the volcano's vents – Duraznero, Hoyo Negro, and Llano del Banco. A local geologist, Juan Bonelli-Rubio, witnessed the eruption and recorded details on various phenomenon related to the eruption. Bonelli-Rubio visited the summit area of the volcano and found that a fissure about 2.5 kilometres (1.6 mi) long had opened on the east side of the summit. As a result, the western half of the volcano – which is the volcanically active arm of a triple-armed rift – had slipped approximately 2 metres (7 ft) downwards and 1 metre (3 ft) westwards towards the Atlantic Ocean.

In 1971, an eruption occurred at the Teneguía vent at the southern end of the sub-aerial section of the volcano without any movement. The section affected by the 1949 eruption is currently stationary and does not appear to have moved since the initial rupture.

Cumbre Vieja remained dormant until an eruption began on 19 September 2021.

It is likely that several eruptions would be required before failure would occur on Cumbre Vieja. The western half of the volcano has an approximate volume of 500 cubic kilometres (120 cu mi) and an estimated mass of 1.5 trillion metric tons (1.7×10^{12} short tons). If it were to catastrophically slide into the ocean, it could generate a wave with an initial height of about 1,000 metres (3,300 ft) at the island, and a likely height of around 50 metres (200 ft) at the Caribbean and the Eastern North American seaboard when it runs ashore eight or more hours later. Tens of millions of lives could be lost in the cities and/or towns of St. John's, Halifax, Boston, New York, Baltimore, Washington, D.C., Miami, Havana and the rest of the eastern coasts of the United States and Canada, as well as many other cities on the Atlantic coast in Europe, South America and Africa. The likelihood of this happening is a matter of vigorous debate.

Geologists and volcanologists are in general agreement that the initial study was flawed. The current geology does not suggest that a collapse is imminent. Indeed, it seems to be geologically impossible right now – the region conjectured as prone to collapse is too small and too stable to collapse within the next 10,000 years. A closer study of deposits left in the ocean from previous landslides suggests that a landslide would likely occur as a series of smaller collapses rather than a single landslide. A megatsunami does seem possible locally in the distant future as there is geological evidence from past deposits suggesting that a megatsunami occurred with marine material deposited 41 to 188 metres (135 to 617 ft) above sea level between 32,000 and 1.75 million years ago. This seems to have been local to Gran Canaria.

Day and Ward have admitted that their original analysis of the danger was based on several worst case assumptions. A 2008 study examined this scenario and concluded that while it could cause a megatsunami, it would be local to the Canary Islands and would diminish in height, becoming a smaller tsunami by the time it reached the continents as the waves interfered and spread across the oceans.

=== Hawaii ===
Sharp cliffs and associated ocean debris at the Kohala Volcano, Lanai and Molokai indicate that landslides from the flank of the Kilauea and Mauna Loa volcanoes in Hawaii may have triggered past megatsunamis, most recently at 120,000 BP. A tsunami event is also possible, with the tsunami potentially reaching up to about 1 kilometre (3,300 ft) in height. According to the documentary National Geographic's Ultimate Disaster: Tsunami, if a big landslide occurred at Mauna Loa or the Hilina Slump, a 30-metre (98 ft) tsunami would take only thirty minutes to reach Honolulu. There, hundreds of thousands of people could be killed as the tsunami could level Honolulu and travel 25 kilometres (16 mi) inland.

Other research suggests that such a single large landslide is not likely. Instead, it would collapse as a series of smaller landslides.

In 2018, shortly after the beginning of the 2018 lower Puna eruption, a National Geographic article responded to such claims with "Will a monstrous landslide off the side of Kilauea trigger a monster tsunami bound for California? Short answer: No."

In the same article, geologist Mika McKinnon stated:

there are submarine landslides, and submarine landslides do trigger tsunamis, but these are really small, localized tsunamis. They don't produce tsunamis that move across the ocean. In all likelihood, it wouldn't even impact the other Hawaiian islands.

Another volcanologist, Janine Krippner, added:

People are worried about the catastrophic crashing of the volcano into the ocean. There's no evidence that this will happen. It is slowly – really slowly – moving toward the ocean, but it's been happening for a very long time.

Despite this, evidence suggests that catastrophic collapses do occur on Hawaiian volcanoes and generate local tsunamis.

=== Norway ===
Although known earlier to the local population, a crack 2 metres (6.6 ft) wide and 500 metres (1,640 ft) in length in the side of the mountain Åkerneset in Norway was rediscovered in 1983 and attracted scientific attention. Located at (62°10'52.28"N, 6°59'35.38"E), it since has widened at a rate of 4 centimetres (1.6 in) per year. Geological analysis has revealed that a slab of rock 62 metres (203 ft) thick and at an elevation stretching from 150 to 900 metres (492 to 2,953 ft) is in motion. Geologists assess that an eventual catastrophic collapse of 18,000,000 to 54,000,000 cubic metres (24,000,000 to 71,000,000 cu yd) of rock into Sunnylvsfjorden is inevitable and could generate megatsunamis of 35 to 100 metres (115 to 328 ft) in height on the fjord′s opposite shore. The waves are expected to strike Hellesylt with a height of 35 to 85 metres (115 to 279 ft), Geiranger with a height of 30 to 70 metres (98 to 230 ft), Tafjord with a height of 14 metres (46 ft), and many other communities in Norway's Sunnmøre district with a height of several metres, and to be noticeable even at Ålesund. The predicted disaster is depicted in the 2015 Norwegian film The Wave.

== See also ==
- 2004 Indian Ocean earthquake and tsunami
- List of tsunamis
- Teletsunami
- Tsunamis in lakes
- Volcanic tsunami
