= Tsunamis in lakes =

Tsunamis in lakes are tsunamis generated by the displacement of water within large inland bodies such as lakes and reservoirs. Like oceanic tsunamis, they are typically caused by sudden geological or physical disturbances, including earthquakes, landslides, volcanic activity, or icefalls. These events can rapidly displace large volumes of water, producing waves that travel across the body of water and impact surrounding shorelines.

Although generally smaller in scale than oceanic tsunamis, lake tsunamis can still produce significant local effects, including shoreline flooding, erosion, and damage to infrastructure near water margins. They are most commonly associated with steep-sided lakes or regions with unstable terrain, where landslides or slope failures can enter the water.

Because lake tsunamis are usually generated close to shore (a near-field source), they often provide little warning time for nearby communities. Their behavior is influenced by lake geometry, water depth, and the nature of the triggering event, which can result in complex wave patterns and amplification in certain areas.

== Causes ==
Inland tsunami hazards can be generated by many different types of earth movement. Some of these include earthquakes in or around lake systems, landslides, debris flow, rock avalanches, and glacier calving. Volcanogenic processes such as gas and mass flow characteristics are discussed in more detail below. Tsunamis in lakes are very uncommon.

=== Earthquakes ===
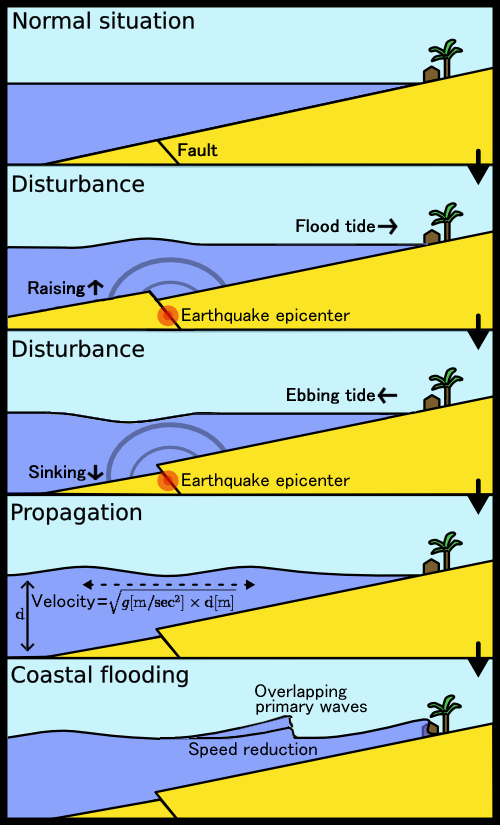
Diagram showing how earthquakes can generate a tsunami

Tsunamis in lakes can be generated by fault displacement beneath or around lake systems. Faulting shifts the ground in a vertical motion through reverse, normal or oblique strike slip faulting processes, this displaces the water above causing a tsunami (Figure 1). The reason strike-slip faulting does not cause tsunamis is because there is no vertical displacement within the fault movement, only lateral movement resulting in no displacement of the water. In an enclosed basin such as a lake, tsunamis are referred to as the initial wave produced by coseismic displacement from an earthquake, and the seiche as the harmonic resonance within the lake.

In order for a tsunami to be generated certain criteria are required:

- Needs to occur just below the lake bottom.
- Earthquake is of high or moderate magnitude, typically over magnitude four.
- Displaces a large enough volume of water to generate a tsunami.

These tsunamis are of high damage potential because they are contained within a relatively small body of water, and are near a field source. Warning time, after the event, is reduced, and organised emergency evacuations after the generation of the tsunami is difficult. On low lying shores even small waves may lead to substantial flooding. Residents should be made aware of emergency evacuation routes, in the event of an earthquake.

==== Lake Tahoe ====
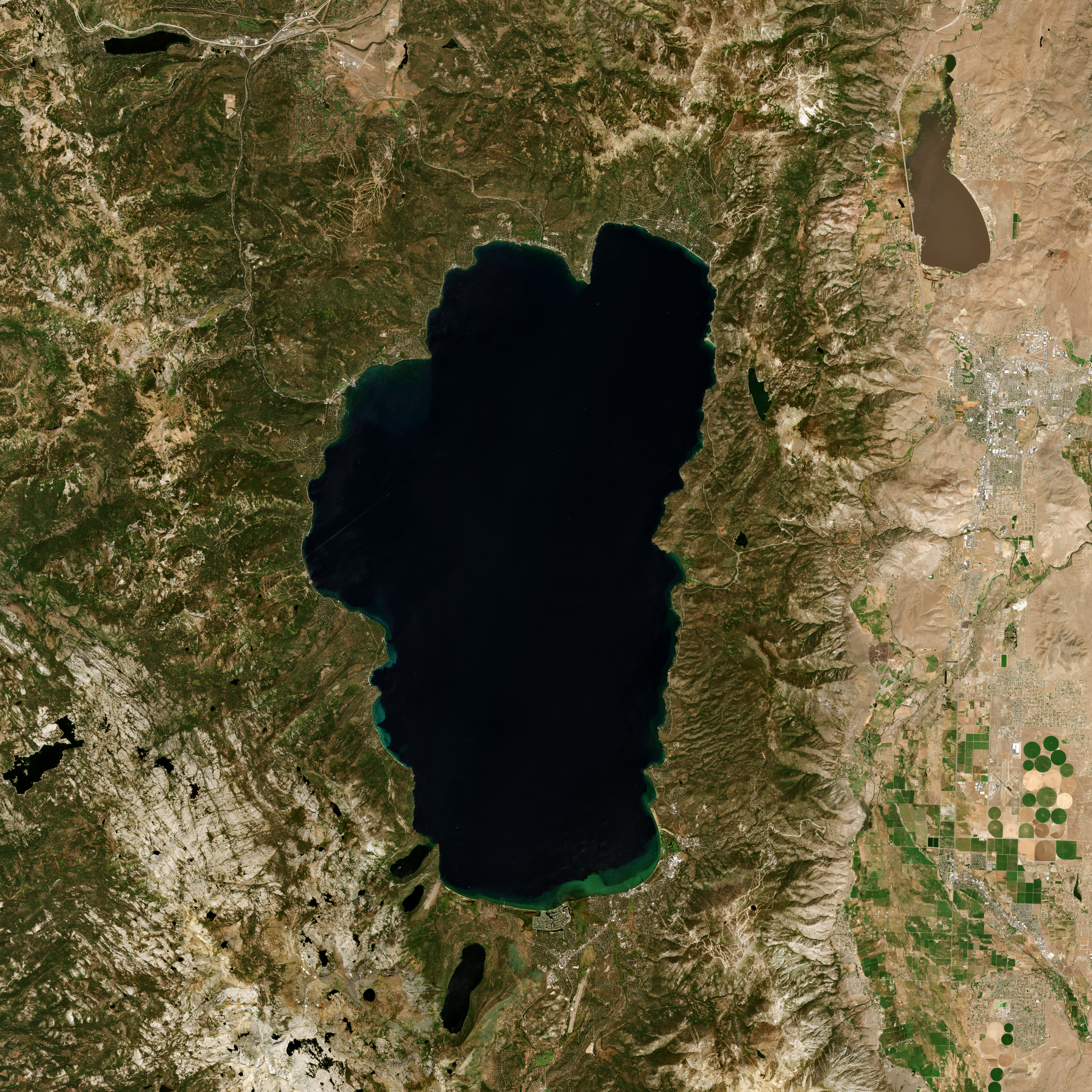
Lake Tahoe from space

Lake Tahoe may be endangered by a tsunami, due to faulting processes. Located in California and Nevada, it lies within an intermountain basin bounded by faults. Most of these faults are at the lake bottom or hidden in glaciofluvial deposits. Lake Tahoe has been affected by prehistoric eruptions, and in studies of the lake bottom sediments, a 10m high scarp has displaced the lake bottom sediments, indicating that the water was once displaced, generating a tsunami. A tsunami and seiche in Lake Tahoe can be treated as shallow-water long waves as the maximum water depth is much smaller than the wavelength. This demonstrates the impact that lakes have on tsunami wave characteristics, which is different from ocean tsunami wave characteristics because the ocean is deeper, and lakes are relatively shallow in comparison. With ocean tsunami, waves amplitudes only increase when the tsunami gets close to shore, however in lake tsunami, waves are generated and contained in a shallow environment.

This would have a major impact on the 34,000 permanent residences along the lake, and on tourism in the area. Tsunami run-ups would leave areas near the lake inundated due to permanent ground subsidence attributed to the earthquake, with the highest run-ups and amplitudes being attributed to the seiches rather than the actual tsunami. Seiches cause damage because of resonance within the bays, reflecting the waves, where they combine to make larger standing waves. Lake Tahoe also experienced a massive collapse of the western edge of the basin that formed McKinney Bay around 50,000 years ago. This was thought to have generated a tsunami/seiche wave with a height approaching 330 ft (100 m).

=== Sub-aerial mass flows ===
Sub-aerial mass flows (landslides or rapid mass wasting) result when a large amount of sediment becomes unstable, as the result of shaking from an earthquake, or saturation of the sediment which initiates a sliding layer. The volume of sediment then flows into the lake, causing a sudden large displacement of water. Tsunamis generated by sub-aerial mass flows are defined in terms of the first initial wave being the tsunami wave, and any tsunamis in terms of sub-aerial mass flows, are characterised into three zones. A splash zone or wave generation zone, is the region where landslides and water motion are coupled and it extends as far as the landslide travels. Next, the near field area, which is based on the characteristics of the tsunami wave, such as amplitude and wavelength which are crucial for predictive purposes. Then the far field area, where the process is mainly influenced by dispersion characteristics and is not often used when investigating tsunamis in lakes. Most lake tsunamis are related only to near field processes.

A modern example of a landslide into a reservoir lake, overtopping a dam, occurred in Italy with the Vajont Dam disaster in 1963. Evidence exists in paleoseismological observations and other sedimentary core sample proxies of catastrophic rock failures of landslide-triggered lake tsunamis worldwide, including in Lake Geneva during AD 563.

==== New Zealand example ====
In the event of the Alpine fault in New Zealand rupturing in the South Island, it is predicted that there would be shaking of approximately Modified Mercali Intensity 5 in the lake-side towns of Queenstown (Lake Wakatipu) and Wānaka (Lake Wānaka). These could possibly cause sub-aerial mass flows that could generate tsunamis within the lakes. This would have a devastating impact on the 28,224 residents (2013 New Zealand census) who occupy these lake towns, not only in the potential losses of life and property, but the damage to the booming tourism industry, which would require years to rebuild.

The Otago Regional Council, responsible for the area, has recognised that in such an event, tsunamis could occur in both lakes.

=== Volcanogenic processes ===
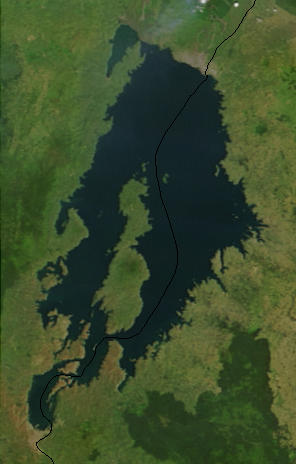
Satellite image of Lake Kivu

Tsunamis may be generated in lakes by volcanogenic processes, in terms of gas build-up causing violent lake overturns, and other processes such as pyroclastic flows, which require more complex modeling. Lake overturns can be incredibly dangerous and occur when gas, trapped at the bottom of the lake, is heated by rising magma, causing an explosion and release of CO_{2} gas; an example of this is Lake Kivu.

==== Lake Kivu ====
Lake Kivu, one of the African Great Lakes, lies on the border between the Democratic Republic of the Congo and Rwanda, and is part of the East Africa Rift. As part of the rift, it is affected by volcanic activity beneath the lake. This has led to a buildup of methane and carbon dioxide at the bottom of the lake, which can lead to violent limnic eruptions.

Limnic eruptions (also called "lake overturns") are due to volcanic interaction with the water at the bottom of the lake that has high gas concentrations, this leads to heating of the lake and this rapid rise in temperature would spark a methane explosion displacing a large amount of water, followed nearly simultaneously by a release of carbon dioxide. This carbon dioxide would suffocate large numbers of people, with a possible tsunami generated from water displaced by the gas explosion affecting all of the 2 million people who occupy the shores of Lake Kivu. This is incredibly important as the warning times for an event such as a lake overturn is incredibly short in the order of minutes and the event itself may not even be noticed. Education of locals and preparation is crucial in this case and much research in this area has been done in order to try to understand what is happening within the lake, in order to try to reduce the effects when this phenomenon does happen.

A potential limnic eruption at Lake Kivu could occur either through the gradual accumulation of dissolved gases to saturation over time or through triggering by volcanic or seismic activity. In such an event, large volumes of carbon dioxide and methane—estimated at over 400 billion cubic metres—may rapidly exsolve from deep waters, producing a rising column of gas and water that displaces the lake surface.

The resulting disturbance may initially drive vertical displacement, with water rising up to approximately 25 m (82 ft) above lake level, before spreading outward across the surface. The disturbance can extend over areas exceeding 1 km in width and may develop over the course of up to a day. Surface waters may move away from the source at speeds of 20–40 m/s (about 45-90 mph) generating waves that may reach heights of 10–20 m (33–66 ft) although their size and behavior remain difficult to predict.

Secondary effects may include flooding along shorelines and downstream systems such as the Ruzizi River, where sudden increases in lake level could produce rapid downstream surges. In addition, the release of dense gas clouds may pose a hazard to surrounding areas, as carbon dioxide-rich gas can accumulate in low-lying regions and displace oxygen. The scale and behavior of such events remain uncertain and depend on lake conditions and triggering mechanisms.

== Modern examples ==
=== Askja ===
At 11:24 PM on 21 July 2014, in a period experiencing an earthquake swarm related to the upcoming eruption of Bárðarbunga, an 800m-wide section gave way on the slopes of the Icelandic volcano Askja. Beginning at 350m over water height, it caused a tsunami 20–30 meters high across the caldera, and potentially larger at localized points of impact. Thanks to the late hour, no tourists were present; however, search and rescue observed a steam cloud rising from the volcano, apparently geothermal steam released by the landslide. Whether geothermal activity played a role in the landslide is uncertain. A total of 30–50 million cubic meters was involved in the landslide, raising the caldera's water level by 1–2 meters.

=== Spirit Lake ===
On March 27, 1980, Mount St. Helens erupted and Spirit Lake received the full impact of the lateral blast from the volcano. The blast and the debris avalanche associated with this eruption temporarily displaced much of the lake from its bed and forced lake waters as a wave as high as 850 ft (260 m) above lake level on the mountain slopes along the north shoreline of the lake. The debris avalanche deposited about 430,000,000 cubic metres (350,000 acre⋅ft) of pyrolized trees, other plant material, volcanic ash, and volcanic debris of various origins into Spirit Lake. The deposition of this volcanic material decreased the lake volume by approximately 56,000,000 cubic metres (45,000 acre⋅ft). Lahar and pyroclastic-flow deposits from the eruption blocked its natural pre-eruption outlet to the North Fork Toutle River valley at its outlet, raising the surface elevation of the lake by between 197 ft (60 m) and 206 ft (63 m). The surface area of the lake was increased from 1,300 acres to about 2,200 acres and its maximum depth decreased from 190 ft (58 m) to 110 ft (34 m).

== Hazard mitigation ==
Hazard mitigation for tsunamis in lakes is immensely important in the preservation of life, infrastructure and property. In order for hazard management of tsunamis in lakes to function at full capacity there are four aspects that need to be balanced and interacted with each other, these are:

- Readiness (preparedness for a tsunami in the lake)
  - Evacuation plans
  - Making sure equipment and supplies are on standby in case of a tsunami
  - Education of locals on what hazard is posed to them and what they need to do in the event of a tsunami in the lake
- Response to the tsunami event in the lake
  - Rescue operations
  - Getting aid into the area such as food and medical equipment
  - Providing temporary housing for people who have been displaced.
- Recovery from the tsunami
  - Re-establishing damaged road networks and infrastructure
  - Re-building and/or relocation for damaged buildings
  - Cleanup of debris and flooded areas of land.
- Reduction (plans to reduce the effects of the next tsunami)
  - Putting in place land use zoning to provide a buffer for tsunami run ups, meaning that buildings cannot be built right on the lake shore.

When all these aspects are taken into consideration and continually managed and maintained, the vulnerability of an area to a tsunami within the lake decreases. This is not because the hazard itself has decreased but the awareness of the people who would be affected makes them more prepared to deal with the situation when it does occur. This reduces recovery and response times for an area, decreasing the amount of disruption and in turn the effect the disaster has on the community.

== Future research ==
Investigation into the phenomena of tsunamis in lakes for this article was restricted by certain limitations. Internationally there has been a fair amount of research into certain lakes but not all lakes that can be affected by the phenomenon have been covered. This is especially true for New Zealand with the possible occurrence of tsunamis in the major lakes recognised as a hazard, but with no further research completed.

== See also ==
- List of tsunamis
- Ice jam
- Megatsunami (lists several lake incidents)
- Mount Breakenridge
- Quick clay
- Seiche
