= Israel Russell =

American geologist and geographer

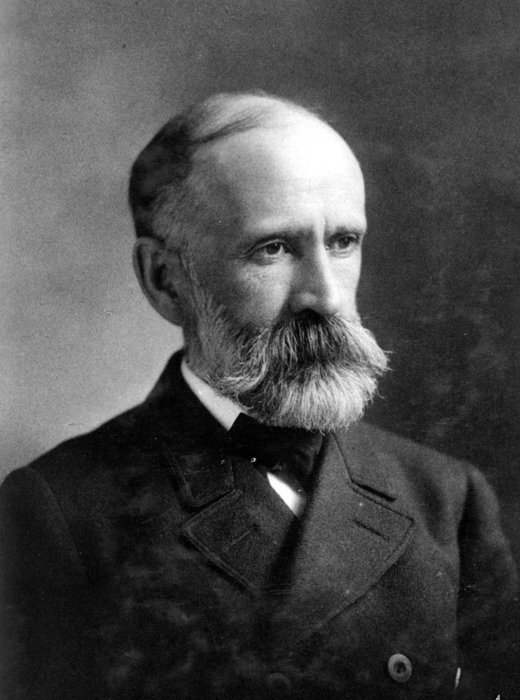
- Israel Russell circa 1900
- Born: December 10, 1852; Garrattsville, New York
- Died: May 1, 1906 (aged 53); Ann Arbor, Michigan
- Resting place: Forest Hill Cemetery, Ann Arbor, Michigan
- Education: Hasbrooks Institute, Jersey City, NJ
- Alma mater: University of the City of New York, BS Civil Engineer(1872), MS (1875)
- Spouse: Julia Augusta Olmsted
- Children: Ruth, Helen, Edith, and Ralph
- Scientific career
- Workplaces: Columbia School of Mines, United States Geological Survey, University of Michigan

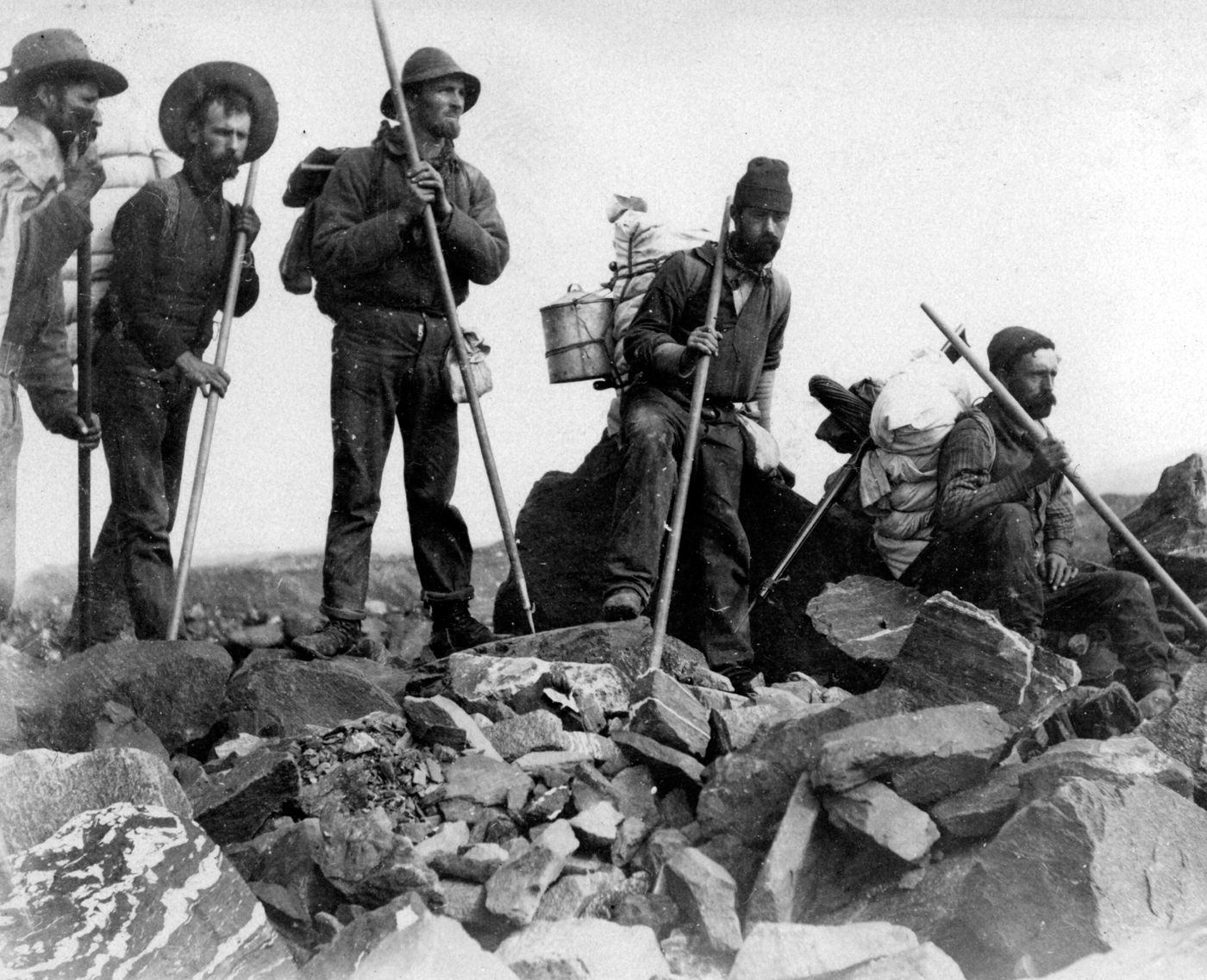
Israel Russell and exploring party on Malaspina Glacier Moraine, approach route to Mount St Elias, Alaska, 1890

Israel Cook Russell, LL.D. (December 10, 1852 – May 1, 1906) was an American geologist and geographer known for his seminal work on paleolakes of the Great Basin and exploration of Alaska in the late 19th century.

== Early life and education ==
Russell was born at Garrattsville, New York, on December 10, 1852. He received B.S. and C.E. degrees in 1872 from the University of the City of New York (now New York University), and later studied at the School of Mines, Columbia College.

== Career ==
In 1874 he accompanied one of the parties sent out by the United States government to observe the transit of Venus, and was stationed at Queenstown, New Zealand. On his return in 1875 he was appointed assistant in geology at the School of mines, and in 1878 he became assistant geologist on the United States geological and geographical survey west of the 100th meridian.

In 1880, he became a member of the United States Geological Survey (USGS). Between 1881 and 1885 he worked at Mono Lake in east-central California. Originally employed in support of surveys for construction of the Bodie Railway connecting the Lake with Bodie, he stayed for four years making field observations that culminated in publication of The Quaternary History of Mono Valley, California (1889). Russell's investigations of pluvial stages of Lake Lahontan and Mono Lake (later named pluvial "Lake Russell" in recognition of his work) combined evidence from observations of shoreline deposits, sediments preserved in outcrop, terraces, and moraines to infer lake basin history and may be considered to be the first limnogeological studies. He represented the USGS in 1889 in an expedition sent to Alaska by the United States Coast and Geodetic Survey to establish a portion of Alaska's eastern boundary. During the next two years, he explored, under the joint auspices of the USGS and the National Geographic Society, the slopes of Mount Saint Elias and the Yakutat Bay area. In 1890 he made the first reported sighting of Mount Logan, the highest mountain in Canada, and gave the mountain its name.

In 1892 he became professor of geology at the University of Michigan. At the time of his death, he was President of the Geological Society of America.

In May 1902, Russell was one of a party of scientists who travelled on the USS Dixie to document the eruptions of La Soufriere, St Vincent and Mont Pelee, Martinique. Russell was sent by the National Geographic Society along with Robert T. Hill and Carsten Borchgrevink.

=== Death ===
Russell died suddenly on May 1, 1906, after suffering pneumonia.

== Honours ==
In 1902, Marcus Baker of the USGS named Russell Fiord in his honor. Mount Russell in Alaska, Mount Rainier's Russell Glacier in Washington, Mount Russell (California), and the prehistoric Lake Russell in California's Mono Basin are also named for him.

The Limnogeology Division of the Geological Society of America annually gives the Israel C. Russell Award to outstanding geoscientists in recognition of major achievements in limnogeology through contributions in research, teaching, and service.

== Writing ==
Besides many contributions on geological subjects to various scientific periodicals, he published scientific memoirs, which were issued as annual reports of the Geological Survey, or as separate monographs.

=== Works ===
- Sketch of the Geological History of Lake Lahontan (1883)
- A Geological Reconnaissance in Southern Oregon (1884)
- Existing Glaciers of the United States (1885)
- Geological History of Lake Lahontan (1885)
- Geological History of Mono Valley (1888)
- Sub-Aerial Decay of Rocks (1888)
- Russell, Israel Cook (1893). A geological reconnoissance in central Washington. Bulletin. Vol. 108. Washington, D.C.: United States Geological Service. doi:10.3133/b108.
- Lakes of North America (1895)
- Glaciers of North America (1897)
- Volcanoes of North America (1897)
- Rivers of North America (1898)
- North America (1904)
