= Hubbard Glacier =

Glacier in Alaska, US, and Yukon, Canada

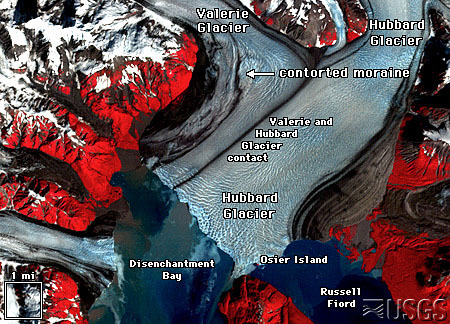
- False color image of the Hubbard Glacier

- Location within Alaska
- Interactive map of Hubbard Glacier
- Type: Tidewater/Mountain glacier AKA Valley Glacier
- Location: Yakutat City and Borough, Alaska, U.S.; Yukon, Canada
- Coordinates: 60°18′50″N 139°22′15″W
- Length: 122 kilometres (76 mi)
- Terminus: Sealevel
- Status: Advancing

Hubbard Glacier (Lingít: Sít' Tlein) is a glacier located in Wrangell–St. Elias National Park and Preserve in eastern Alaska and Kluane National Park and Reserve in Yukon, Canada, and named after Gardiner Hubbard.

== Geography ==
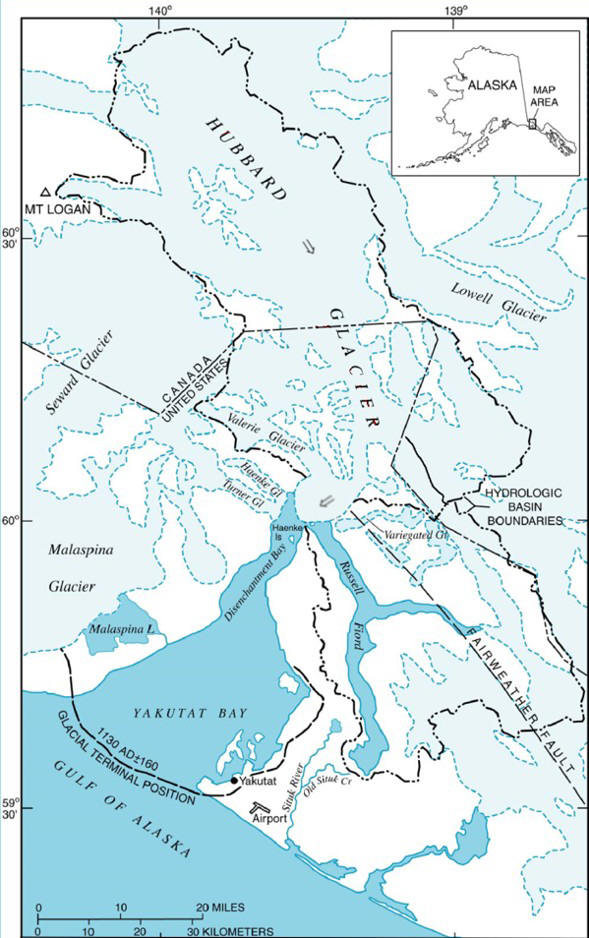
Map of Hubbard Glacier

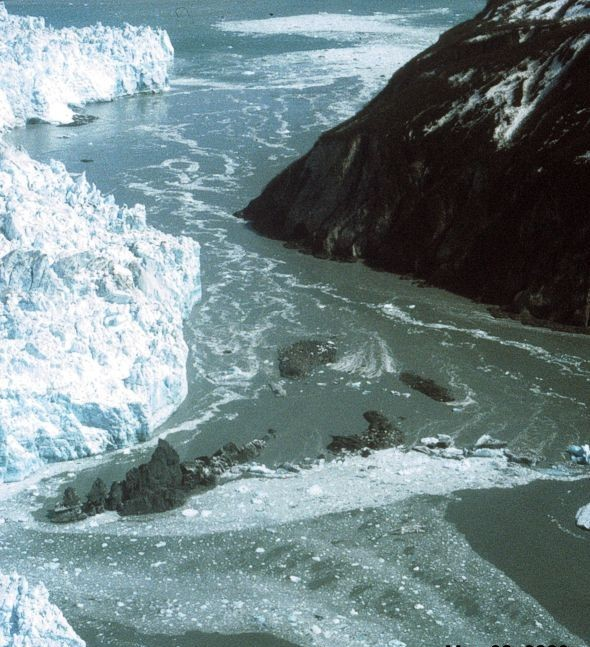
Hubbard Glacier, Alaska, squeezes towards Gilbert Point on May 20, 2002. The glacier is close to sealing off Russell Fjord at top from Disenchantment Bay at bottom.

The longest source for Hubbard Glacier originates 122 kilometres (76 mi) from its snout and is located at about 61°00′N 140°09′W, approximately 8 kilometres (5 mi) west of Mount Walsh with an elevation around 3,400 metres (11,200 ft). A shorter tributary glacier begins at the easternmost summit on the Mount Logan ridge at about 5,600 metres (18,400 ft) at about 60°35′0″N 140°22′40″W.

Before it reaches the sea, Hubbard is joined by the Valerie Glacier to the west, which, through forward surges of its own ice, has contributed to the advance of the ice flow that experts believe will eventually dam the Russell Fjord from Disenchantment Bay waters.

The Hubbard Glacier ice margin has continued to advance for about a century. In May 1986, the Hubbard Glacier surged forward, blocking the outlet of Russell Fjord and creating Russell Lake. All that summer, the new lake filled with runoff; its water level rose 25 metres (82 ft), and the decrease in salinity threatened its sea life.

Around midnight on October 8, the dam began to give way. In the next 24 hours, an estimated 5.3 cubic kilometres (1.3 cu mi) of water gushed through the gap, and the fjord was reconnected to the ocean at its previous level. This was the largest glacial lake outburst flood (GLOF) in recorded history.

In spring 2002, the glacier again approached Bert Point. It pushed a terminal moraine ahead of its face and closed the opening again in July. On August 14, the terminal moraine was washed away after rains had raised the water level behind the dam it formed to 18 m (59 ft) above sea level. The fjord could become dammed again, and perhaps permanently. If this happens, the fjord could overflow its southern banks and drain through the Situk River instead, threatening trout habitat and a local airport.

It takes about 400 years for ice to traverse the length of the glacier, meaning that the ice at the foot of the glacier is about 400 years old. The glacier routinely calves off icebergs the size of a ten-story building. Where the glacier meets the bay, most of the ice is below the waterline, and newly calved icebergs can shoot up quite dramatically, so that ships must keep their distance from the edge of the glacier in Disenchantment Bay.

A magnitude M7 earthquake was recorded on 6 December 2025, with significant risks for landslides.

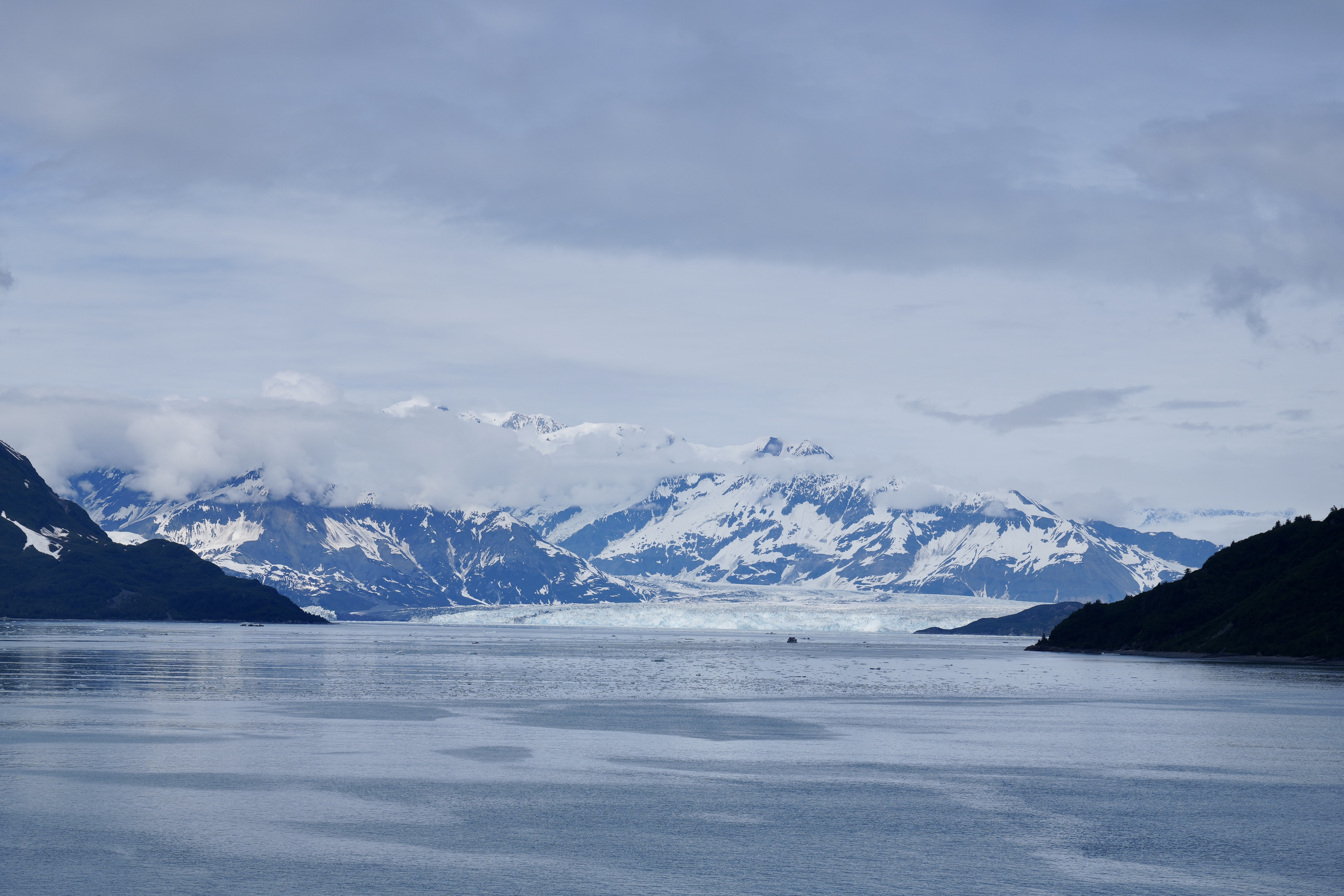
The Hubbard Glacier in Disenchantment Bay, Alaska In June of 2022

== Collision ==
On June 25, 2022, the cruise ship Norwegian Sun collided into a growler (a chunk of ice smaller than an iceberg) in foggy conditions as it approached the Hubbard Glacier for sightseeing. The ship was damaged but it was considered safe. It cut its cruise itinerary short and sailed back to Juneau for assessment, and then Seattle for repairs without further incident.

== MV Hubbard ==
The Alaska Marine Highway System ferry MV Hubbard is named after Hubbard Glacier. This name was chosen by local student Taylor Thompson, whose essay won Alaska's name-the-new-ferry contest.

== See also ==
- Glacial lake outburst flood
- Ice calving

== Gallery ==
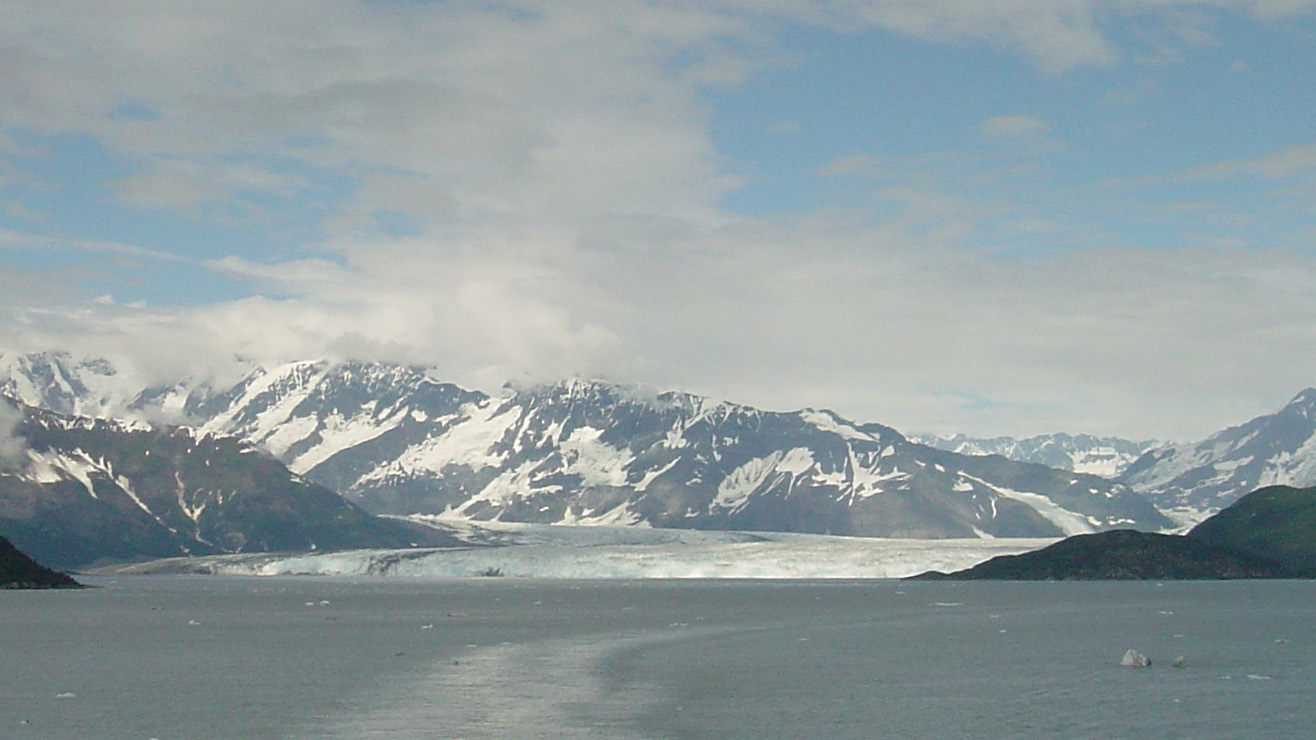
The glacier from a distance

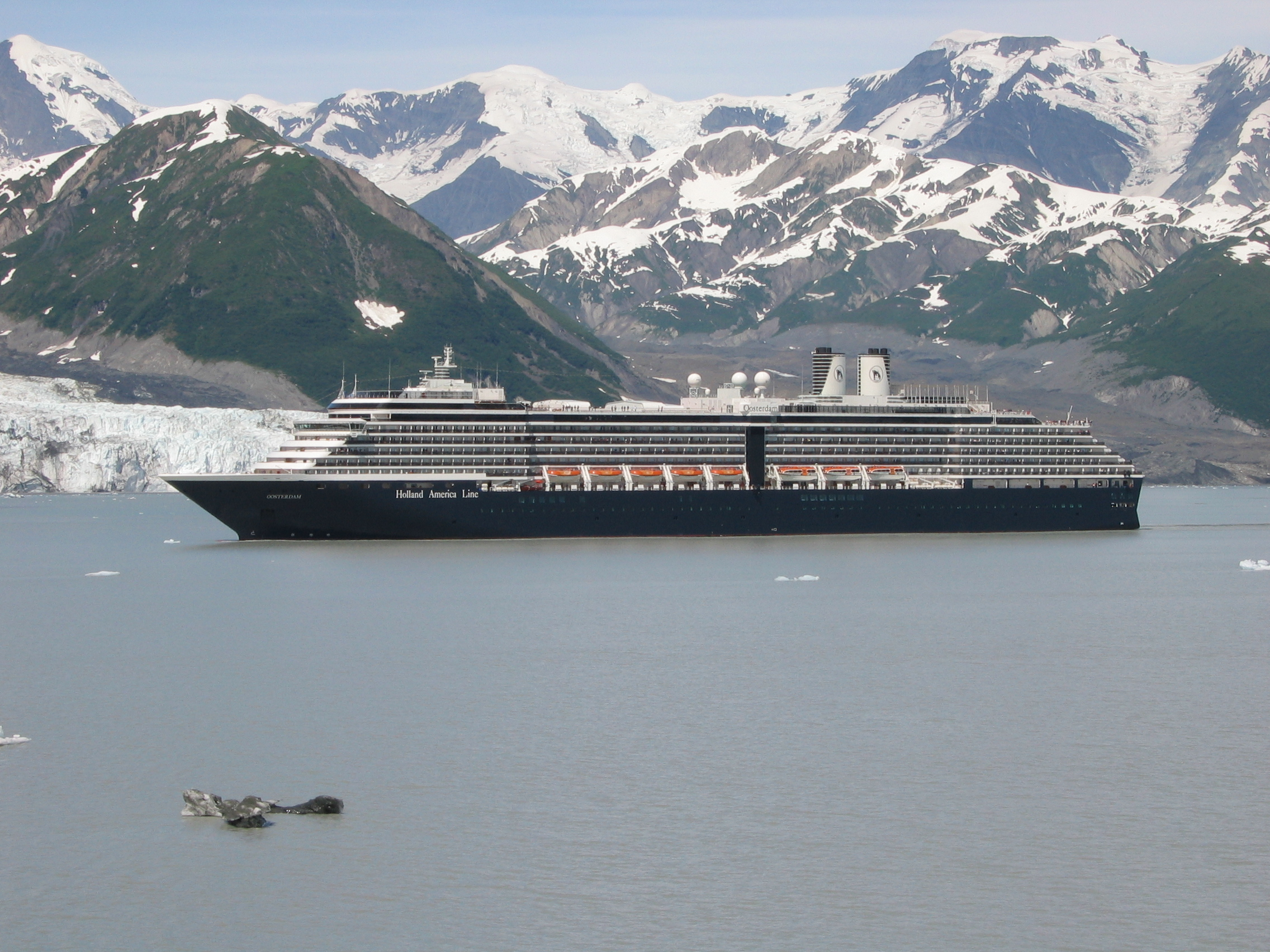
Holland America Line's MS Oosterdam passing Turner Glacier while leaving Disenchantment Bay

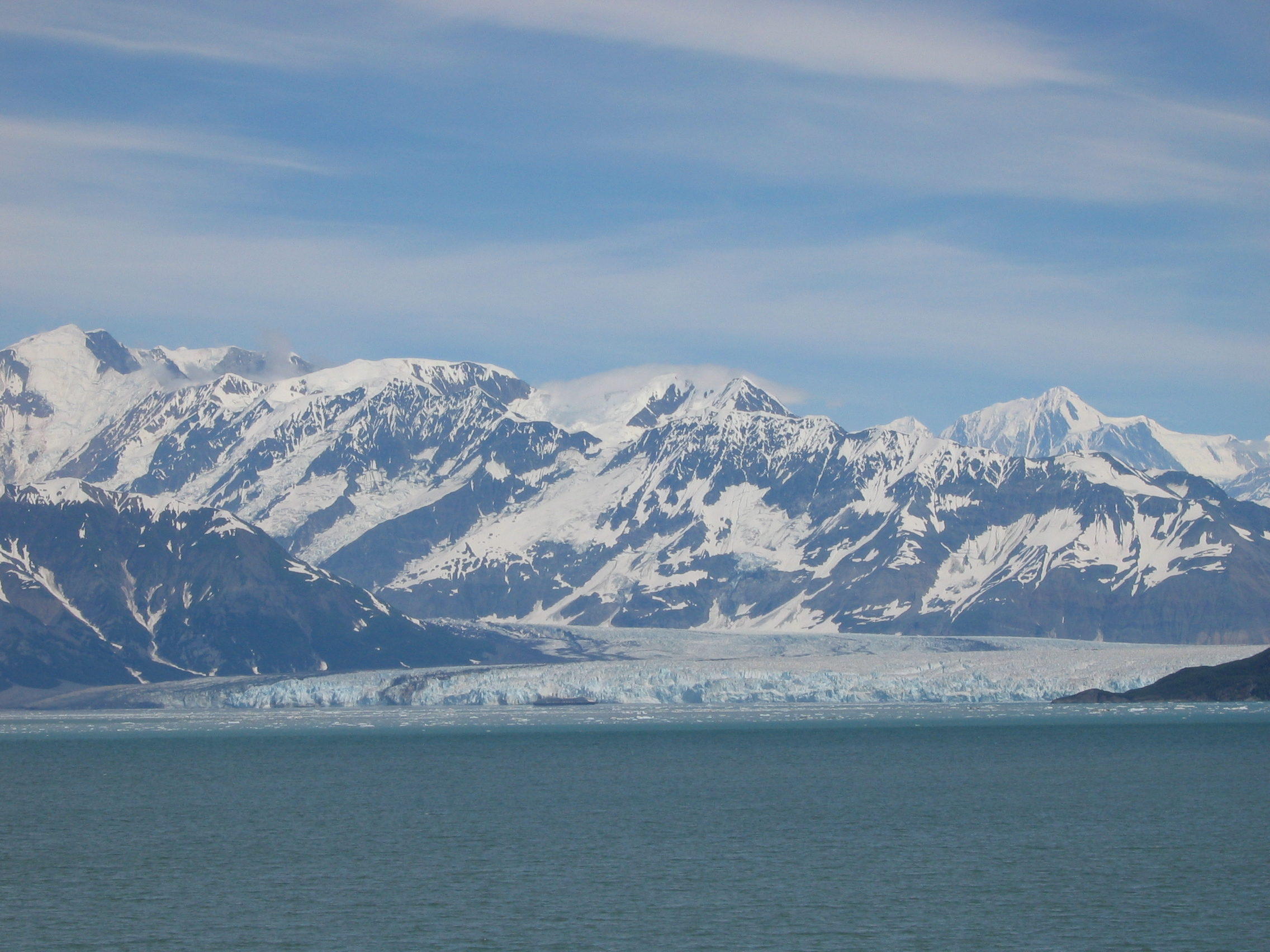
Hubbard Glacier and icebergs formed by calving

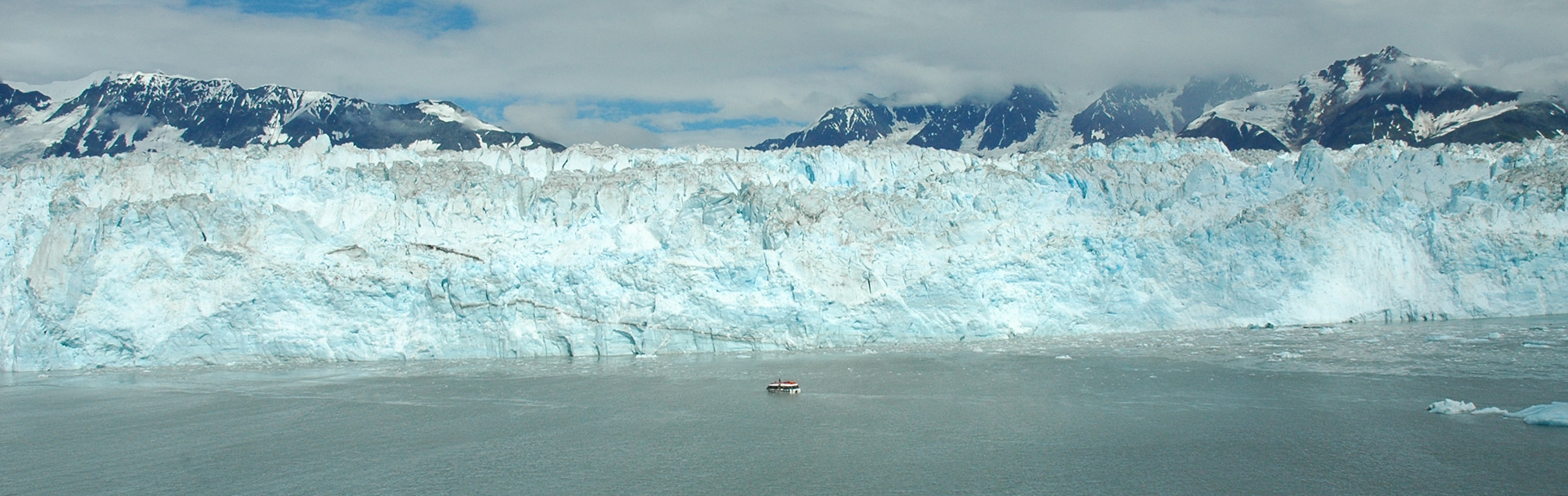
Closeup of Hubbard Glacier

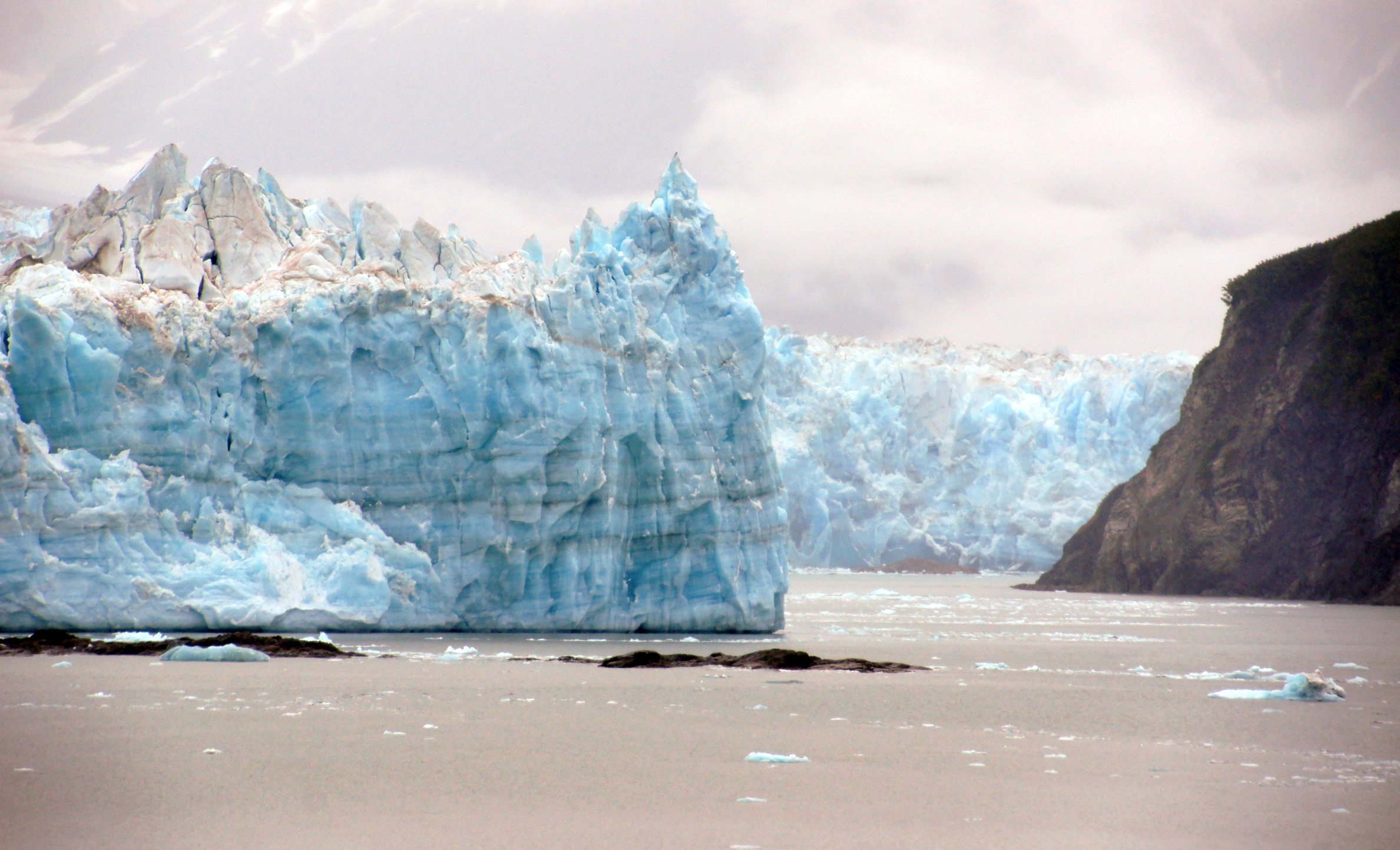
The glacier relatively close

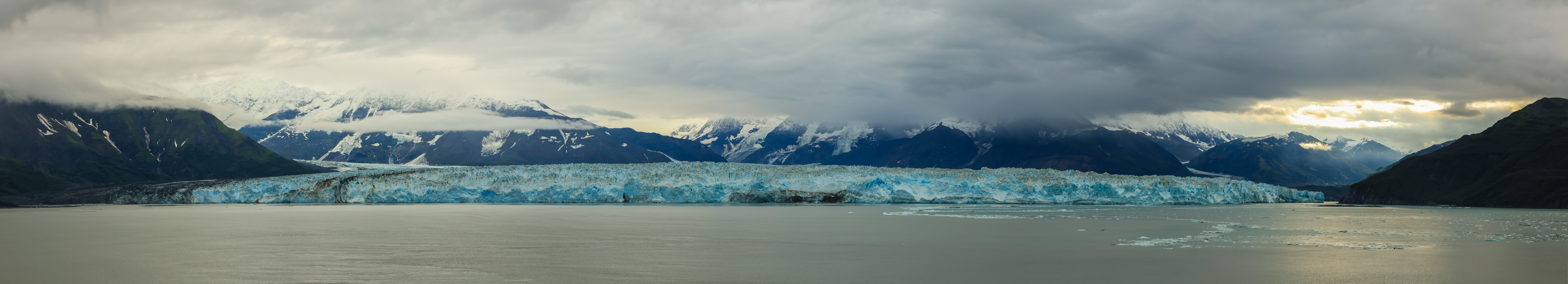
Panoramic view

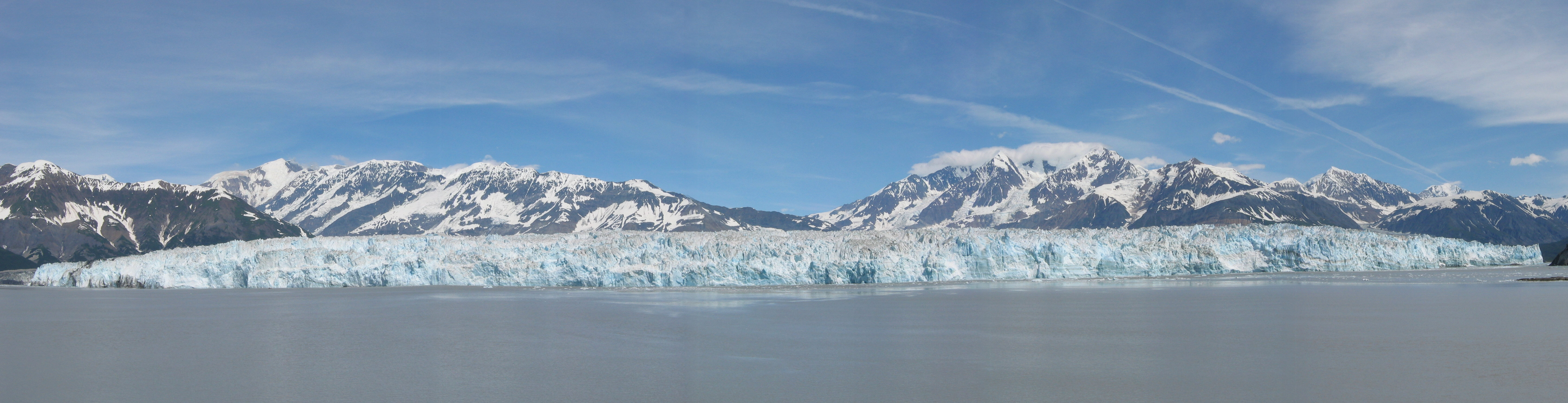
Panoramic view of the glacier
