= Russell Fiord =

Fjord in Alaska, US

Coordinates: 59°48′04″N 139°19′27″W

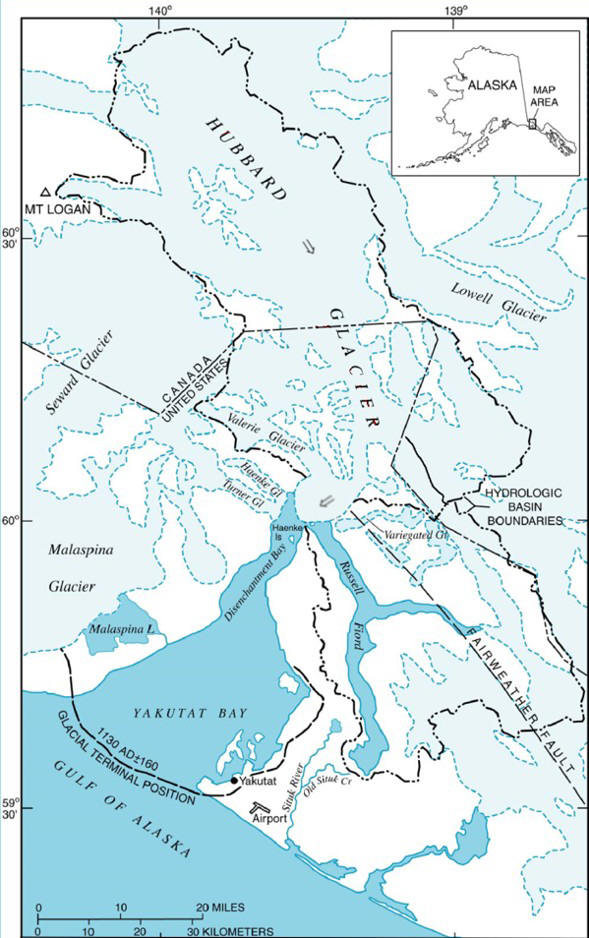
Russell Fiord

Russell Fiord, also spelled Russell Fjord, is a fjord in the U.S. state of Alaska. It extends north to Disenchantment Bay, the terminus of Hubbard Glacier, at the head of Yakutat Bay. The fjord was named in 1901 by Marcus Baker of the U.S. Geological Survey for explorer Israel Russell, who discovered the estuary in 1891 while exploring the Yakutat region.

The opening into Disenchantment Bay has been periodically blocked by Hubbard Glacier, turning Russell Fiord into a lake collecting freshwater run-off from the glacier. The entrance closed from May to October 1986, and again briefly in 2002.

== Russell Fiord Wilderness ==
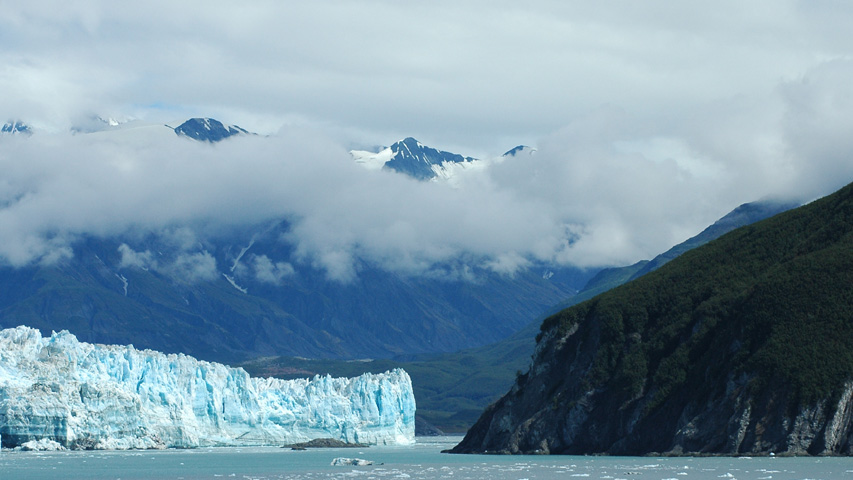
Opening into Russell Fjord

The Russell Fiord Wilderness is a wilderness area within the Tongass National Forest, protecting 348,701 acres (1,411 km^{2}) surrounding the fjord. The wilderness was established by the Alaska National Interest Lands Conservation Act in 1980 and is managed by the U.S. Forest Service. The Wrangell-Saint Elias Wilderness borders it to the northwest.
