= Russell Glacier (Mount Rainier) =

Glacier in United States

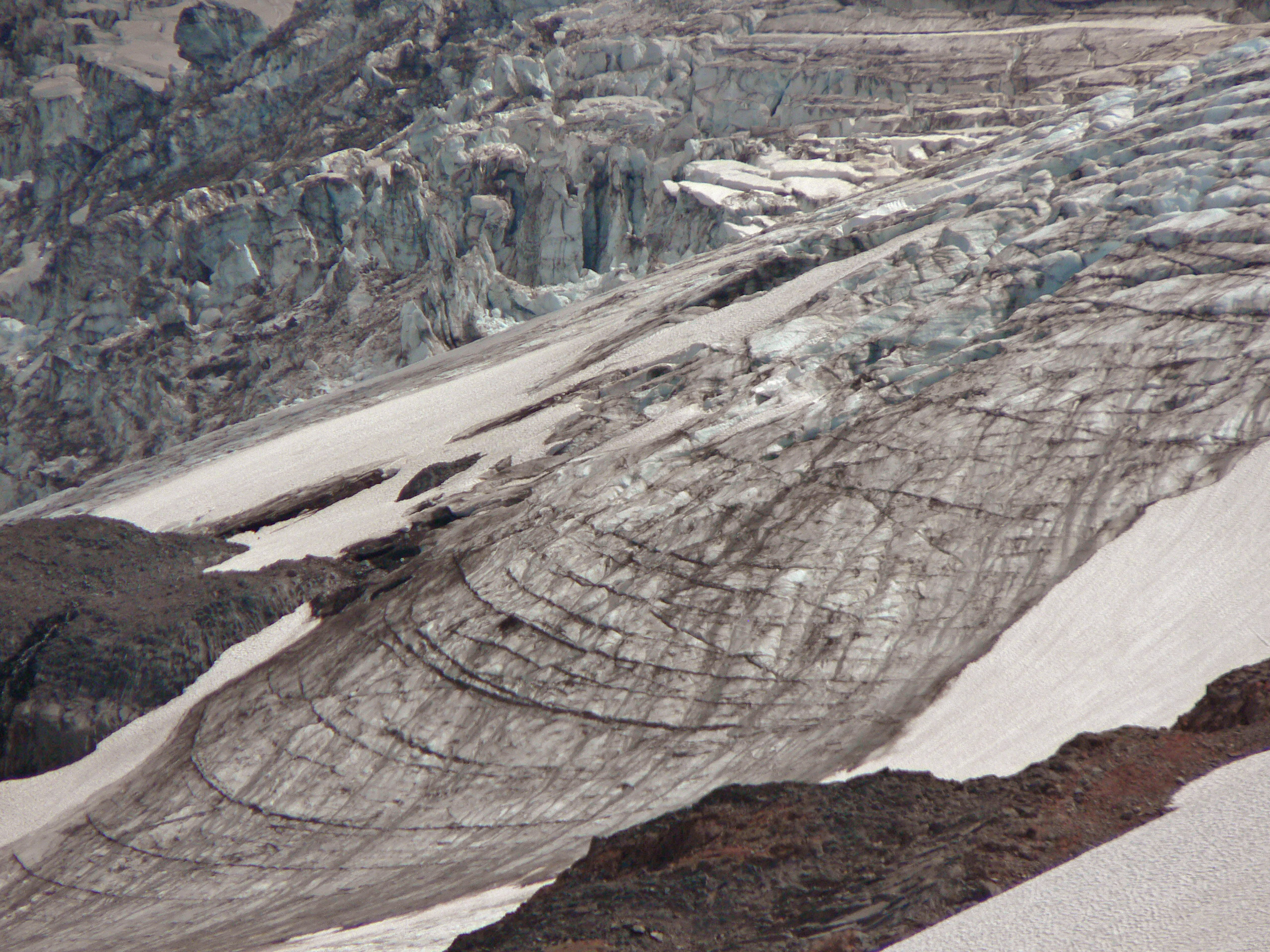
- Ablation zone of Russell Glacier with Carbon Glacier behind
- Interactive map of Russell Glacier
- Type: Mountain glacier
- Location: Mount Rainier, Pierce County, Washington, USA
- Coordinates: 46°53′52″N 121°47′20″W
- Area: 1.3 square miles (3.4 km^{2}), 1983

The Russell Glacier is a medium-sized glacier on the north flank of Mount Rainier, Washington. Named for the geologist Israel Russell, it covers 1.3 square miles (3.4 km^{2}) and contains 3.1 billion ft^{3} (88 million m^{3}) of ice. Starting from its highest point at 9,400 feet (2,900 m), the Russell Glacier flows northeast towards the Carbon Glacier and contributes ice to the larger glacier before becoming distinct below 7,000 feet (2,100 m). With most of the ice located from 8,000 feet (2,400 m) to 9,000 feet (2,700 m), the glacier only descends to 6,800 feet (2,100 m), unlike the much lower extent of the Carbon Glacier. Echo Rock and 8,364 ft (2,549 m) Observation Rock, two minor sub-peaks of Rainier, lie northwest of this glacier. Meltwater from the glacier eventually reaches the Carbon River.

== See also ==
- List of glaciers
