= Haenke Island =

Island in Alaska

Coordinates: 59°58′11″N 139°32′15″W

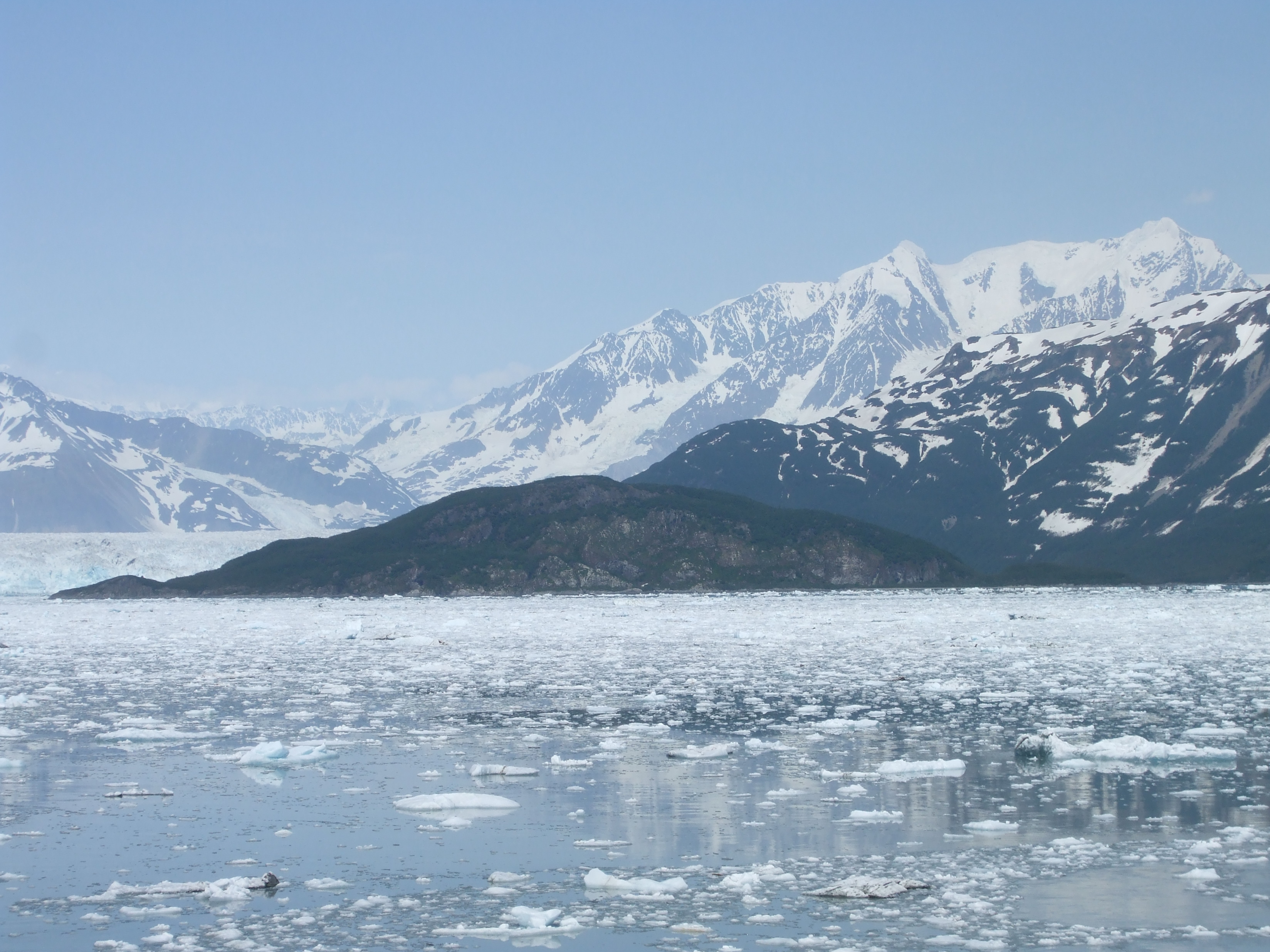
Haenke Island

Haenke Island is an island located in Disenchantment Bay in Alaska. It was named in 1791 by Alessandro Malaspina for Thaddäus Haenke, who was serving as botanist and naturalist with Malaspina's expedition. The island is part of Yakutat City and Borough.
