= Yakutat Bay =

Bay in Alaska, US

Coordinates: 59°43′54″N 139°50′19″W

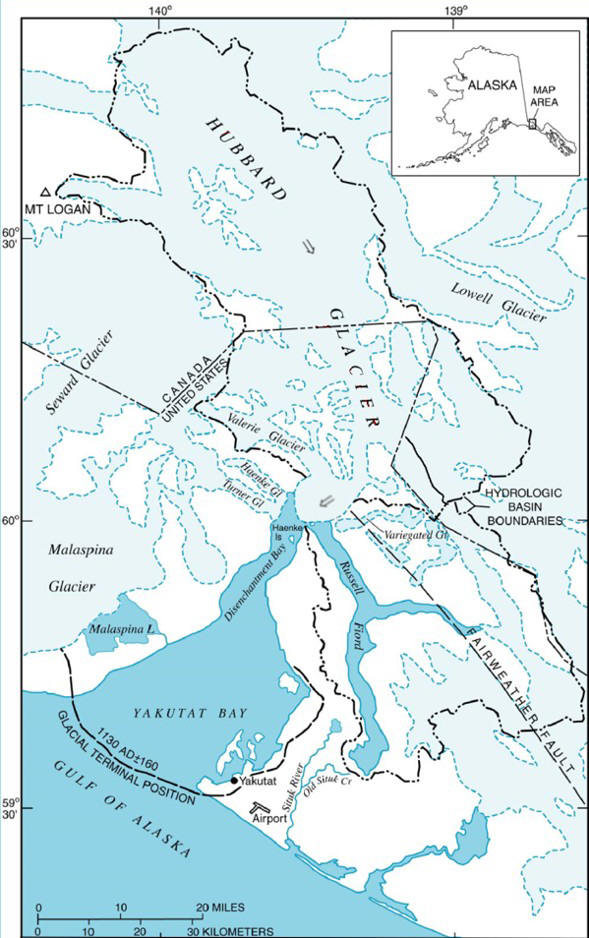
Map of Yakutat Bay

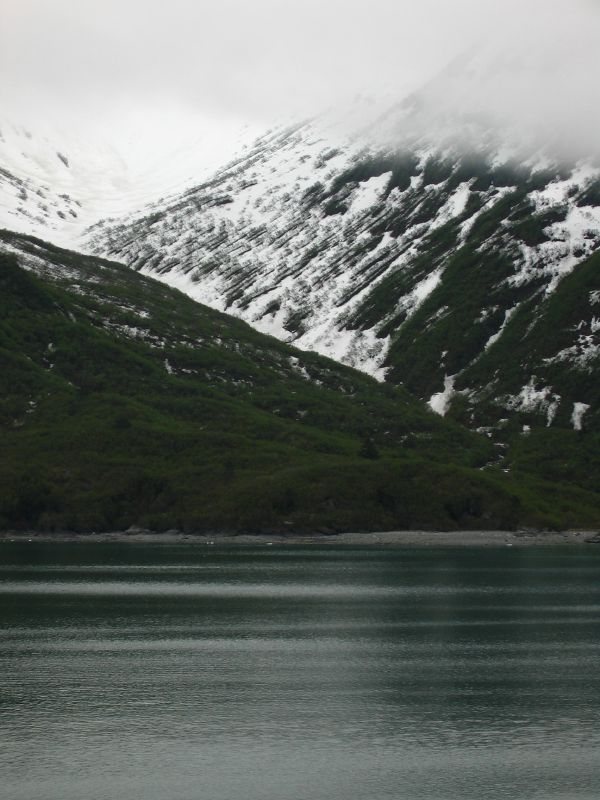
Glacier-carved mountains near Yakutat Bay

Yakutat Bay (Lingít: Yaakwdáat G̱eeyí) is a 29-kilometre-wide (18 mi) bay in the U.S. state of Alaska, extending southwest from Disenchantment Bay to the Gulf of Alaska. "Yakutat" is a Tlingit name reported as "Jacootat" and "Yacootat" by Yuri Lisyansky in 1805.

Yakutat Bay was the epicenter of two major earthquakes on September 10, 1899, a magnitude 7.4 foreshock and a magnitude 8.0 main shock, 37 minutes apart.

The Shelikhov-Golikov company (precursor of the Russian-American Company), under the management of Alexander Andreyevich Baranov, founded a settlement in Yakutat Bay in 1795. It was known as New Russia, Yakutat Colony, or Slavorossiya.

== Other names ==
Yakutat Bay has had various names.

- James Cook called it "Bering Bay".
- Jean-François de La Pérouse, who visited it in 1786, named it "Baie de Monti" for one of his officers.
- The same year, Captain Nathaniel Portlock named it "Admiralty Bay"
- The Spanish called it "Almirantazgo."
- It was also called "Port Mulgrave" when Alessandro Malaspina and José de Bustamante y Guerra visited the bay in 1791.
- Yuri Lisyansky called it "Jacootat" or "Yacootat" when he visited in 1805.
