= Disenchantment Bay =

Bay in Alaska, United States

Coordinates: 59°57′43″N 139°34′12″W

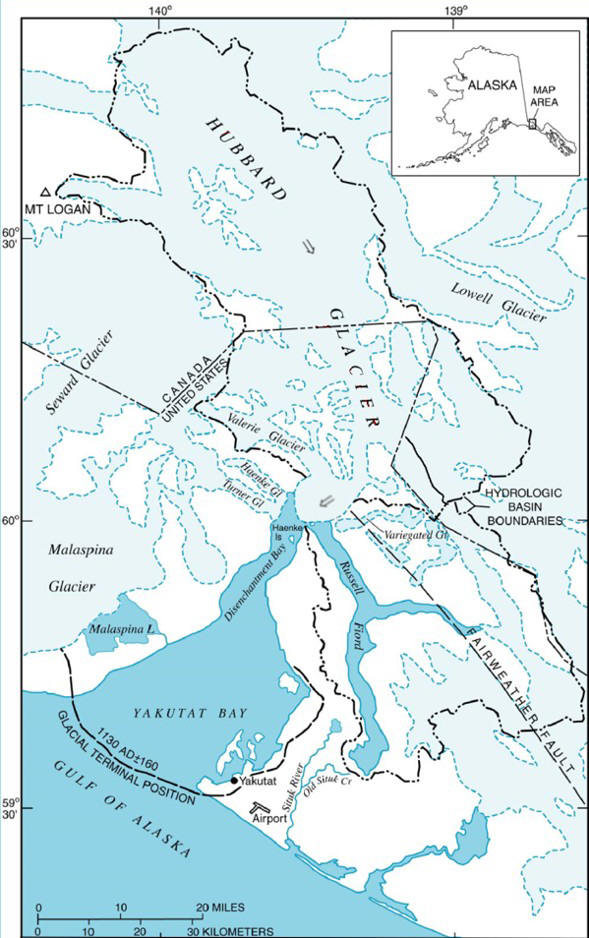
Map of Disenchantment Bay

Disenchantment Bay extends southwest for 16 km (9.9 mi) from the mouth of Russell Fiord to Point Latouche, at the head of Yakutat Bay in Alaska.

Named "Puerto del Desengano", Spanish for "bay of disenchantment", by Alessandro Malaspina in 1792, upon finding that the bay was not the entrance to the legendary Northwest Passage. He sailed up the bay as far as Haenke Island, before discovering the passage blocked by ice.

During the earthquake of September 10, 1899, parts of Disenchantment Bay were raised 47 feet 4 inches (14.43 metres). This is the greatest recorded vertical displacement by an earthquake.
