= List of earthquakes in Italy =

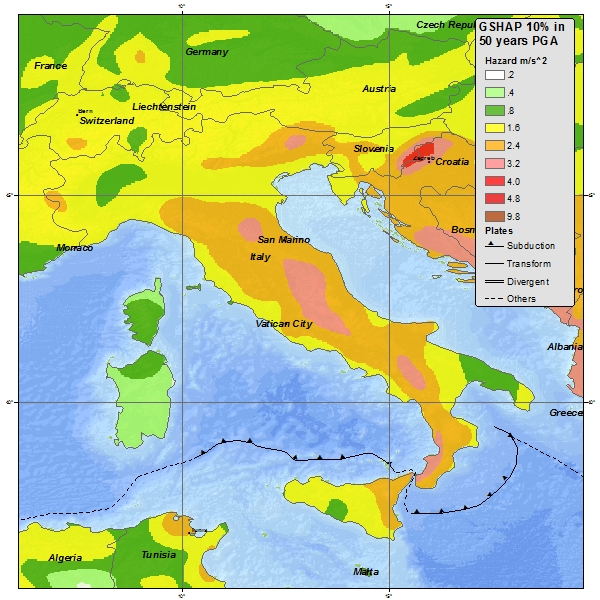
The seismic hazard map of Italy showing the probability of seismic activity for different places in Italy.

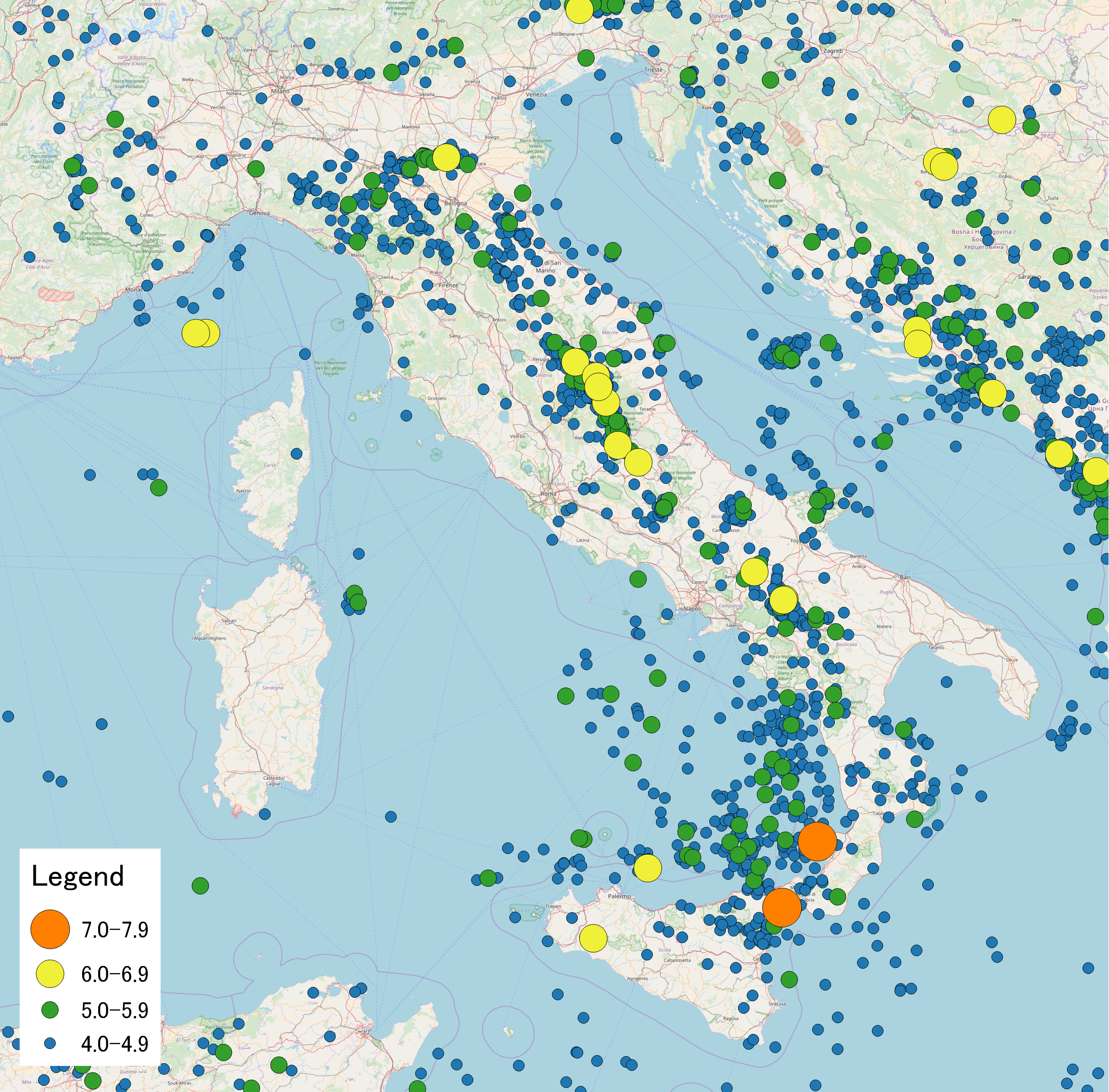
Map of earthquakes in Italy 1900-2017

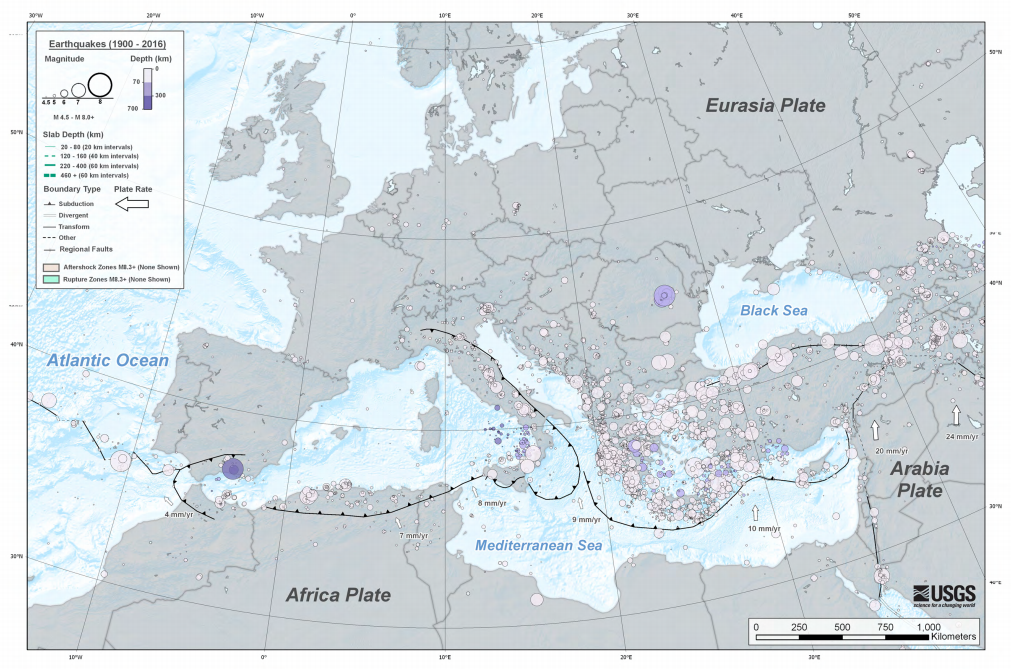
Earthquakes M5.5+ (1900–2016) Mediterranean

This is a list of earthquakes in Italy that had epicentres in Italy, or significantly affected the country. On average every four years an earthquake with a magnitude equal to or greater than 5.5 occurs in Italy.

Due to the particular geodynamic situation (convergence of the Eurasian plate with the African plate) the Italian territory is frequently subject to earthquakes, giving it the record in Europe for these phenomena. Out of 1,300 destructive earthquakes that occurred in the 2nd millennium in the central Mediterranean Sea, 500 affected Italy.

The analysis of the earthquakes indicates that they are mostly distributed along the areas affected by Alpine and Apennine tectonics, where they are caused by movements along faults. The highest seismicity hazard in Italy has been concentrated in the central-southern part of the peninsula, along the Apennine ridge, in Calabria and Sicily and in some northern areas, like Friuli-Venezia Giulia, part of Veneto and western Liguria.

== Geology ==
Italy lies on the southern extent of the Eurasian plate, which is surrounded by the Aegean Sea plate, the Adriatic plate, and the Anatolian sub-plate. The Apennine Mountains contain numerous faults that run along the entire Italian peninsula and form the majority of the destructive boundary between the Eurasian and the Adriatic plates, thus causing Italy to have high amounts of tectonic activity. In addition, Sicily and Calabria are located near the boundary where the African plate is subducting below the Eurasian plate, which was responsible for forming the stratovolcano known as Mount Etna.

== List of major earthquakes ==
Date	Region	Mag.	MMI	Deaths	Injuries	Notes	Ref
2026-07-31	Campania	4.5 M_{w}	VII		26	Severe damage in Pozzuoli	
2025-03-13	Campania	4.2 M_{w}	VI		11	Severe damage	
2023-09-18	Tuscany	5.1 M_{w}	VI	1	1	Severe damage	
2023-03-09	Umbria	4.3 M_{w} 4.6 M_{w}	IV		13	Severe damage	
2022-11-09	Pesaro-Urbino	5.6 M_{w}	VI		11	Moderate damage	
2020-02-24	Calabria	4.8 M_{w}	VI		1	Moderate damage	
2018-12-26	Sicily	5.0 M_{w}	VII		30	Several buildings damaged	
2018-08-16	Molise	5.3 M_{w}	VI		2	Moderate damage	
2017-08-21	Campania	3.9 M_{w}	VIII	2	42	Local collapse of buildings and depth focus of 1.7 km.	
2017-01-18	Abruzzo, Lazio	5.7 M_{w}	VIII	34	29	Sequence	
2016-10-30	Umbria	6.6 M_{w}	XI	3 (indirect)	Dozens	Sequence / extensive damage	
2016-08-24	Lazio, Umbria, Marche	6.2 M_{w}	XI	299	>400		
2013-06-21	Tuscany	5.2 M_{w}	V		4		
2013-02-16	Lazio	4.8 M_{w}	V	1 (indirect)			
2012-05-29	Emilia-Romagna	5.8 M_{w}	VII	20	350		
2012-05-20	Emilia-Romagna	6.1 M_{w}	VII	5 (+2 indirect)	50		
2010-08-16	Sicily	4.5 M_{w}			7	Landslides	
2009-04-06	L'Aquila	6.3 M_{w}	X	308	1,500+	Severe damage	
2004-11-24	Lombardy, Salò	5.1 M_{w}	VII–VIII *		9	Many buildings damaged	
2003-09-14	Emilia-Romagna	5.3 M_{w}	VII		Some	10 buildings damaged	
2003-04-11	Piedmont, Alessandria	5.0 M_{b}	VI *		2		
2002-11-01	Molise	5.8 M_{w}	VIII		3	Doublet / additional damage	
2002-10-31	Molise	5.9 M_{w}	VII	29	135	Doublet	
2002-09-06	Sicily	6.0 M_{w}	V	2	20	Heart attacks / damage	
2001-07-17	Trentino-Alto Adige	4.7 M_{w}	VI *	3	3	Landslides	
1998-09-09	Basilicata, Calabria	5.6 M_{w}	VI–VII *	2	12	Buildings damaged	
1997-09-26	Umbria, Marche	6.1 M_{w}	X	9		Doublet	
1997-09-26	Umbria, Foligno	5.7 M_{w}	VII	2		Doublet	
1991-05-26	Basilicata, Potenza	5.1 M_{b}	VIII		A few	Minor damage	
1990-12-13	Sicily, Augusta	5.6 M_{w}	VII	19	200	Severe damage	
1990-05-05	Basilicata, Campania	5.8 M_{w}	VII	2	16		
1987-05-02	Emilia-Romagna	4.8 M_{b}	VII	1	Several	Slight damage	
1985-03-14	Molise	4.3 M_{w}	V	1		Slight damage	
1984-05-07	Abruzzo, Lazio	5.9 M_{w}	VIII	3	100	Extensive damage	
1984-04-29	Umbria, Gubbio	5.7 M_{w}	VIII		36	Extensive damage	
1983-11-09	Emilia-Romagna	5.1 M_{w}	VIII		100	Some damage	
1980-11-23	Campania, Basilicata	6.9 M_{w}	X	2,483–4,900	7,700–8,934	Extreme damage	
1979-09-19	Umbria, Norcia	5.8 M_{s}		5	5,000	Severe damage	NGDC
1978-04-15	Gulf of Patti, Sicily	5.7 M_{s}		5		Moderate damage	NGDC
1978-03-11	Sicily	5.0 M_{s}		2	2	Moderate damage	NGDC
1976-09-15	Friuli	5.9/6.0		8 (+3 indirect)		Aftershock	
1976-09-11	Friuli	5.8/5.6		2 (indirect)		Aftershock	
1976-05-06	Friuli	6.5 M_{w}	X	900–978	1,700–2,400	Extreme damage	
1972-06-14	Ancona	4.9	IX			Extensive damage / swarm	
1971-07-15	Emilia-Romagna	5.2 M_{b}	VIII *	2		Limited damage	NGDC
1971-02-06	Lazio	4.6 M_{b}	VIII	24	150	Extreme damage	NGDC
1969-08-11	Perugia	4.7 M_{s}	VII		4	Limited damage	NGDC
1968-01-15	Western Sicily	5.5 M_{w}	X	231–400	632–1,000	Sequence	
1962-08-21	Irpinia, Campania	6.1	IX *	16		Moderate damage	
1943-10-03	Offida, Marche	5.5 M_{w}	IX	15		Very heavy damage	
1936-10-18	Cansiglio	5.9 M_{L}	IX	19			
1933-09-26	Abruzzo	5.6 M_{w}	IX	10		Some damage	
1930-10-30	Senigallia, Marche	5.9		18			
1930-07-23	Irpinia	6.6 M_{s}	X	1,404	4,624–7,000		
1920-09-07	Garfagnana	6.4		171			
1917-04-26	Northern Umbria	5.8		20			
1915-01-13	Avezzano	6.7 M_{w}	XI	29,978–32,610		Extreme damage	
1914-05-08	Sicily	4.9 M_{s}	X	120		Severe damage	NGDC
1908-12-28	Strait of Messina	7.1 M_{w}	XI	75,000–200,000		Extreme damage / tsunami	
1907-10-23	Calabria	5.9 M_{s}	VIII–X	158–167		Moderate damage	NGDC
1905-09-08	Calabria	7.2 M_{w}	XI	557–2,500		Tsunami	
1901-10-30	Salò	5.5 M_{w}	VII–VIII			Collapsed buildings	
1894-11-16	Strait of Messina, Sicily, Calabria	6.0	IX	100		Severe damage	
1887-02-23	Liguria	6.2–6.5		>2,000		Significant damage / tsunami	
1883-07-28	Ischia	4.3–5.2 M_{w}	XI	2,313		Near total destruction on in Ischia	
1873-06-29	Veneto	6.3 M_{e}	IX–X	80			
1857-12-16	Basilicata	7.0 M_{w}	XI	10,000		Extreme damage	
1851-08-14	Basilicata			700–2,000+		Many buildings damaged	
1836-04-25	Calabria	6.1	X	239		Severe damage	
1831-05-26	Taggia, Sanremo	5.5	VIII-IX			Moderate damage	
1828-10-09	Ligurian Apennines, province of Alessandria	5.8	VII-VIII	19		Moderate damage	
1808-04-02	Piedmont	5.7	VIII	2		Moderate damage	
1805-07-26	Campania, Molise	6.6 M_{e}	X	5,573		Extreme damage	
1802-05-12	Lombardy, Cremona	5.7 M_{w}	VIII-IX	2		Collapsed churches, houses, and a municipal building	
1783-02-04	Calabria	7.0		50,000			
1762-10-06	L'Aquila	5.3–6.0 M_{w}	IX			Damage	
1743-02-20	Salento	7.1 M_{w}	IX	180–300			
1732-11-29	Campania	6.6		Thousands			
1706-11-03	Abruzzo	6.6-6.84 M_{w}	X	2,400		Extreme damage	
1703-02-12	L'Aquila	6.7	XI	2,500–5,000			
1703-01-16	Montereale	6.2	VIII				
1703-01-14	Norcia	6.7	X	6,240–9,761			
1694-09-08	Basilicata	6.9		>6,000			
1693-01-11	Sicily, Malta	7.4 M_{w}	XI	60,000			
1688-06-05	Sannio	7.0	XI	3,311		Severe damage	NGDC
1659-11-06	Calabria			2,035		Extreme damage	NGDC
1654-07-23	Sorano, Marsica		X	600		Severe damage	NGDC
1639-10-07	Lazio	6.0 M_{w}	IX–X	500			
1638-06-09	Calabria		IX	52		Moderate damage	
1638-03-27	Calabria	7.0 M_{s}	XI	9,581–30,000		Extreme damage / tsunami	
1627-07-30	Apulia	6.7 M_{w}	X	5,000		Tsunami	
1626-07-30	Naples			70,000			
1626-04-05	Girifalco	6.1 M_{w}	X			Very heavy damage	
1616-06-04	Cagliari					No casualties or damage reported. Registeted on a plaque in the city's cathedral	
1570-11-17	Ferrara			70–200			
1561-08-19	Vallo di Diano	6.4 M_{w}	X	500			
1517-03-29	Irpinia	5.4 M_{w}		>50		Moderate damage	
1511-03-26	Friuli		X	15		Severe damage	
1466-01-15	Irpinia	6.1	VIII-IX	>100			
1461-11-27	L'Aquila	6.3	IX	>80		High intensity over Abruzzo region	
1456-12-30	Benevento	6.6 M_{w}	X–XI			Sequence	
1456-12-05	Molise	7.1–7.4 M_{w}	X–XI	30,000–70,000		High intensity over large area. Largest earthquake on the Italian Peninsula.	
1453-09-28	Florence	5.3	VII-VIII			Moderate damage	
1361-07-17	Ascoli Satriano	6.0		>1,000		Extreme damage	
1349-09-09	L'Aquila	6.7	X	2,000		Severe damage	NGDC
1348-01-25	Friuli	6.9	X	10,000		Extreme damage	
1343-11-25	Naples					Tsunami	
1328-12-04	Norcia	6.4	X	2,000-5,000			
1315-12-03	L'Aquila	5.6	IX			Moderate damage	
1298-12-01	Monti Reatini	6.3	X			Numerous deaths and severe damage	
1293-09-04	Samnium, Naples	5.8	VIII-IX			Moderate damage	
1222-12-25	Northern Italy		X	12,000		Extreme damage	
1169-02-04	Sicily		X	15,000–25,000		Severe damage / tsunami	
1117-01-03	Northern Italy		VII			Severe damage	
1046-11-09	Valle dell'Adige		IX-X			Numerous deaths and severe damage	
801-04-29	Central Apennines	5.4 M_{e}	VII–VIII			Severe damage	
951	Rossano		IX			Severe damage	
853	Messina		IX-X			Severe damage	
847	Samnium					Severe damage	
801-04-29	Spoleto, Perugia					Severe damage	
778	Treviso		VIII-IX	48		Moderate damage	
725	Classe		VIII			Moderate damage	
584	Liguria					Severe damage	
375	Benevento		IX			Severe damage	
369-07-21	Benevento			Thousands		Severe damage	
361	Sicily and Calabria		X	Drastic decrease in the population along the Strait of Messina		Extreme damage / tsunami	
346	Samnium		IX			Severe damage	
101	San Valentino in Abruzzo Citeriore		IX-X			Severe damage	
99	Circello, Benevento		IX-X			Severe damage	
79-08-24	Vesuvian area		VIII	Thousands		Earthquake caused by the catastrophic eruption of Mount Vesuvius in 79 AD	
62-02-05	Campania	5.2–6.1	IX–X			Severe damage	
56 BC-04	Potenza Picena		VIII-IX			Severe damage	
91 BC	Modena, Reggio Emilia		VIII			Moderate damage	
100 BC	Marche		VIII-X			Severe damage	
217 BC-06	Etruria		X			Severe damage	
Note: The NGDC has records for significant events that go back several thousand years BCE. Added for source diversity, the United States Geological Survey reports are sufficient from the early 1980s to the present. Occasionally, these sources omit the maximum felt intensity. Rovida et al. 2011 can help fill in some of the gaps. Intensity values derived from this source are indicated with an asterisk. The inclusion criteria for adding events are based on WikiProject Earthquakes' notability guideline that was developed for stand alone articles. The principles described also apply to lists. In summary, only damaging, injurious, or deadly events should be recorded.

== Gallery ==
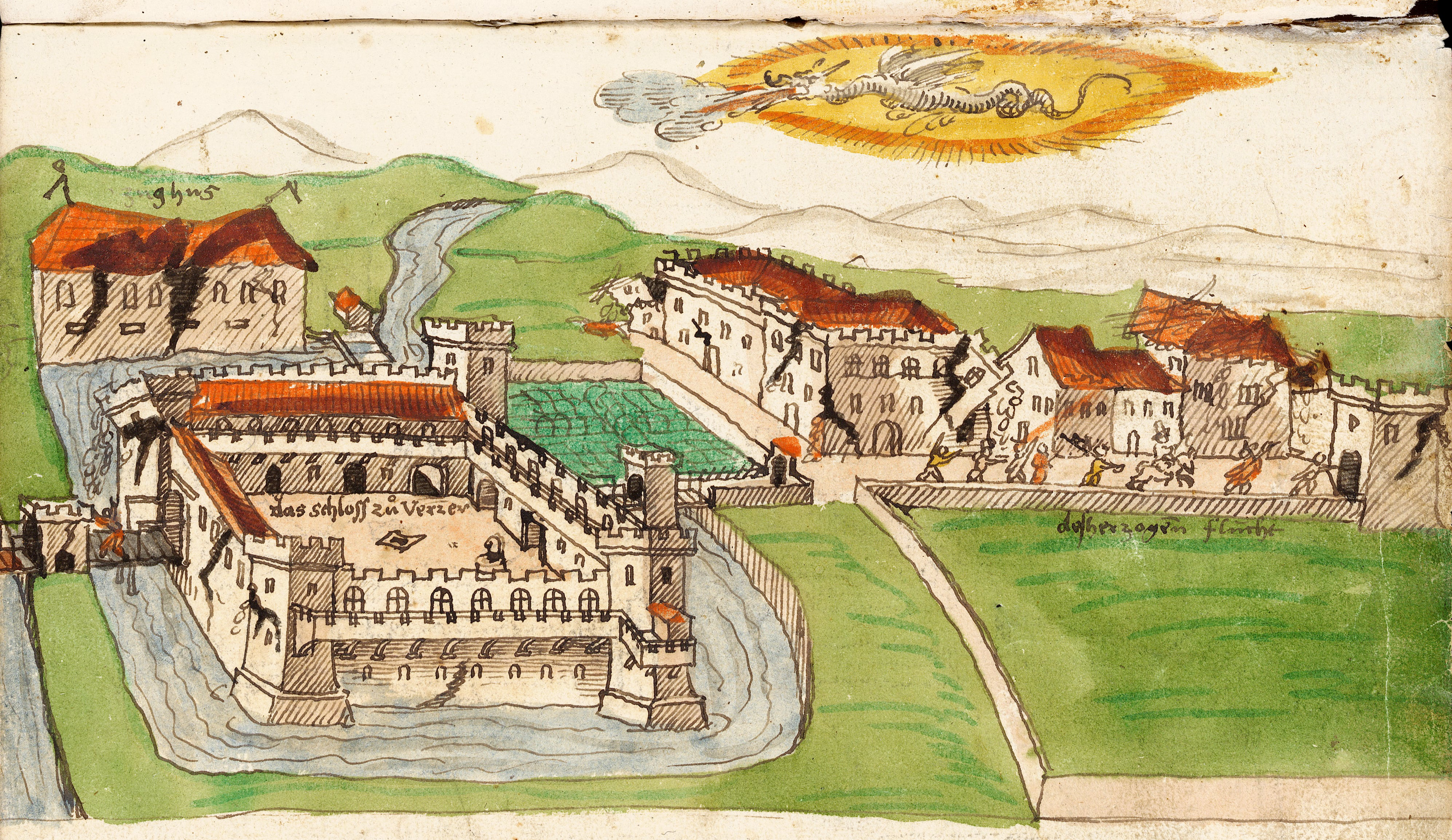
1570 Ferrara earthquake

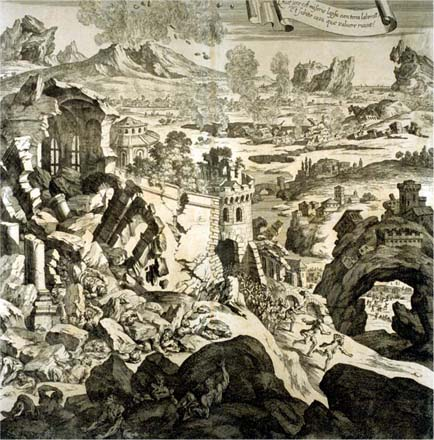
1693 Sicily earthquake

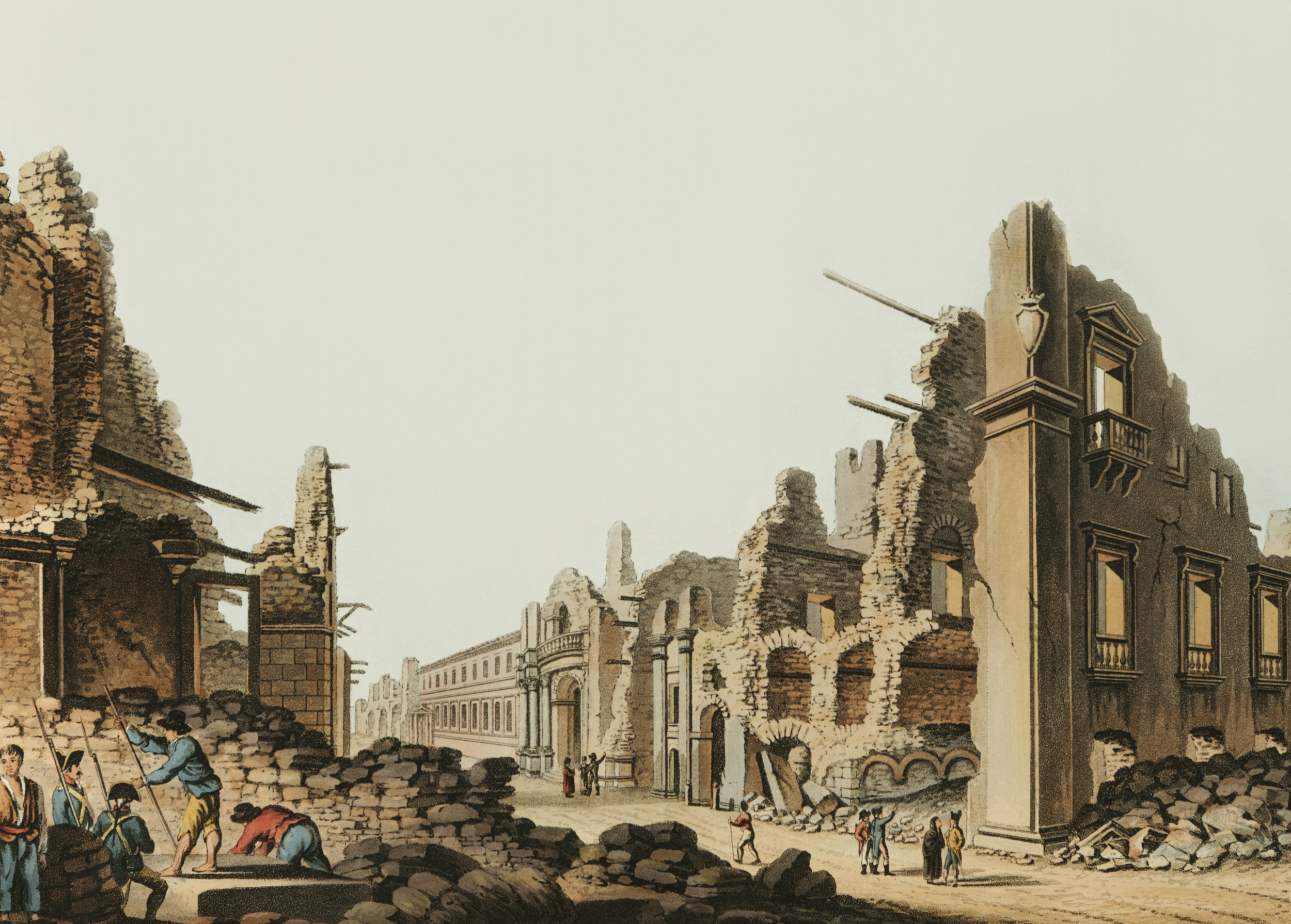
1783 Calabrian earthquake

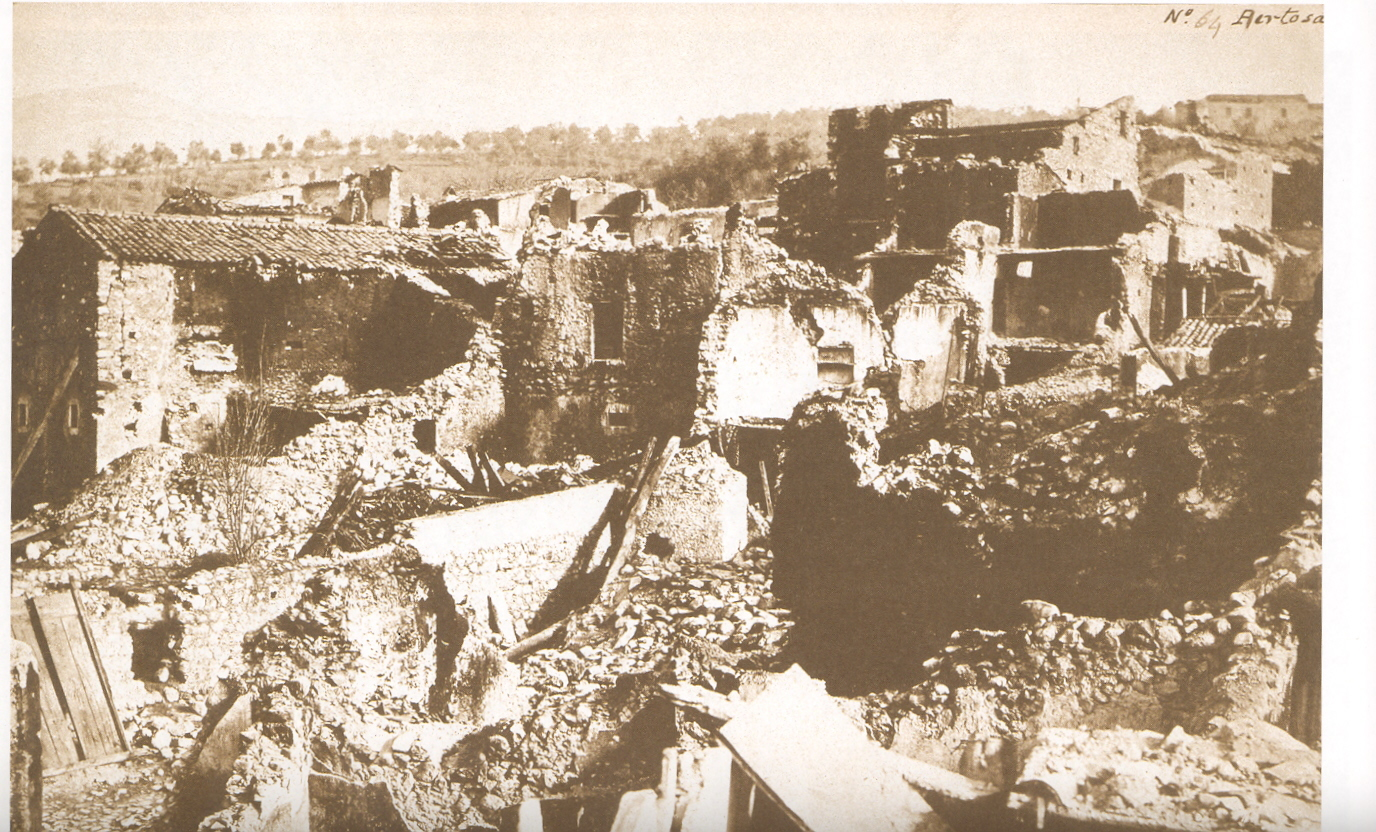
1857 Basilicata earthquake

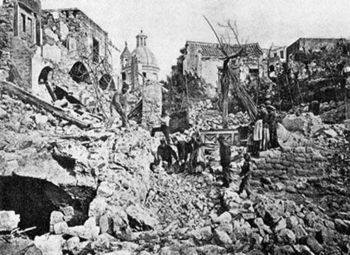
1883 Ischia earthquake

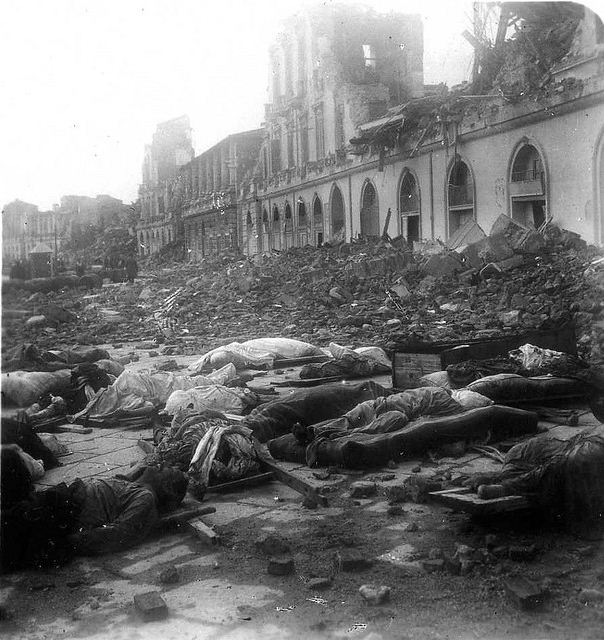
1908 Messina earthquake

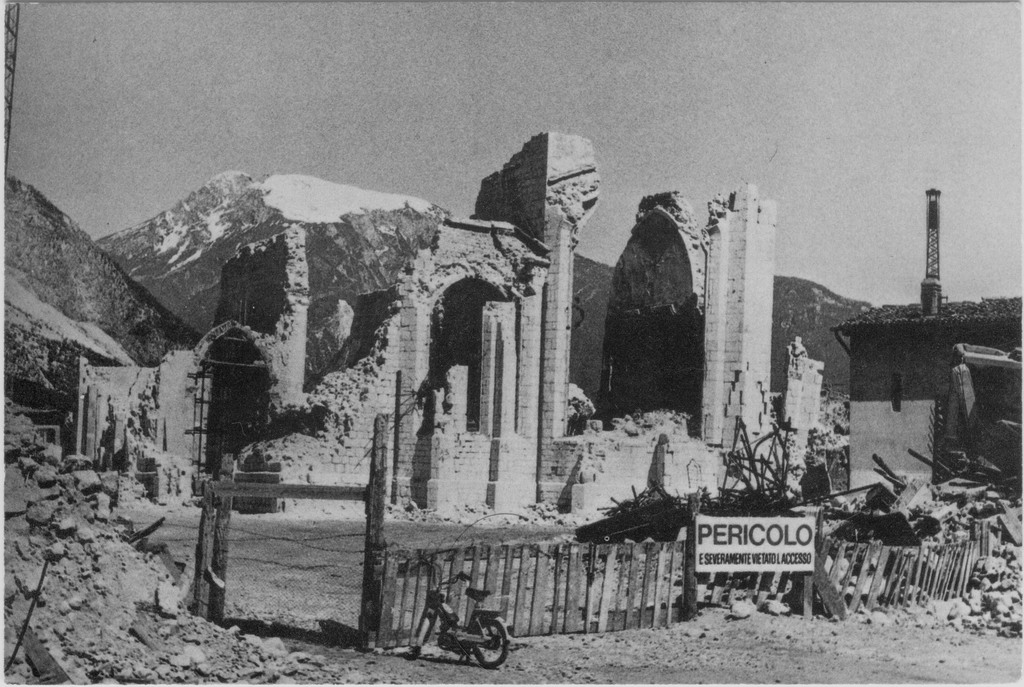
1976 Friuli earthquake

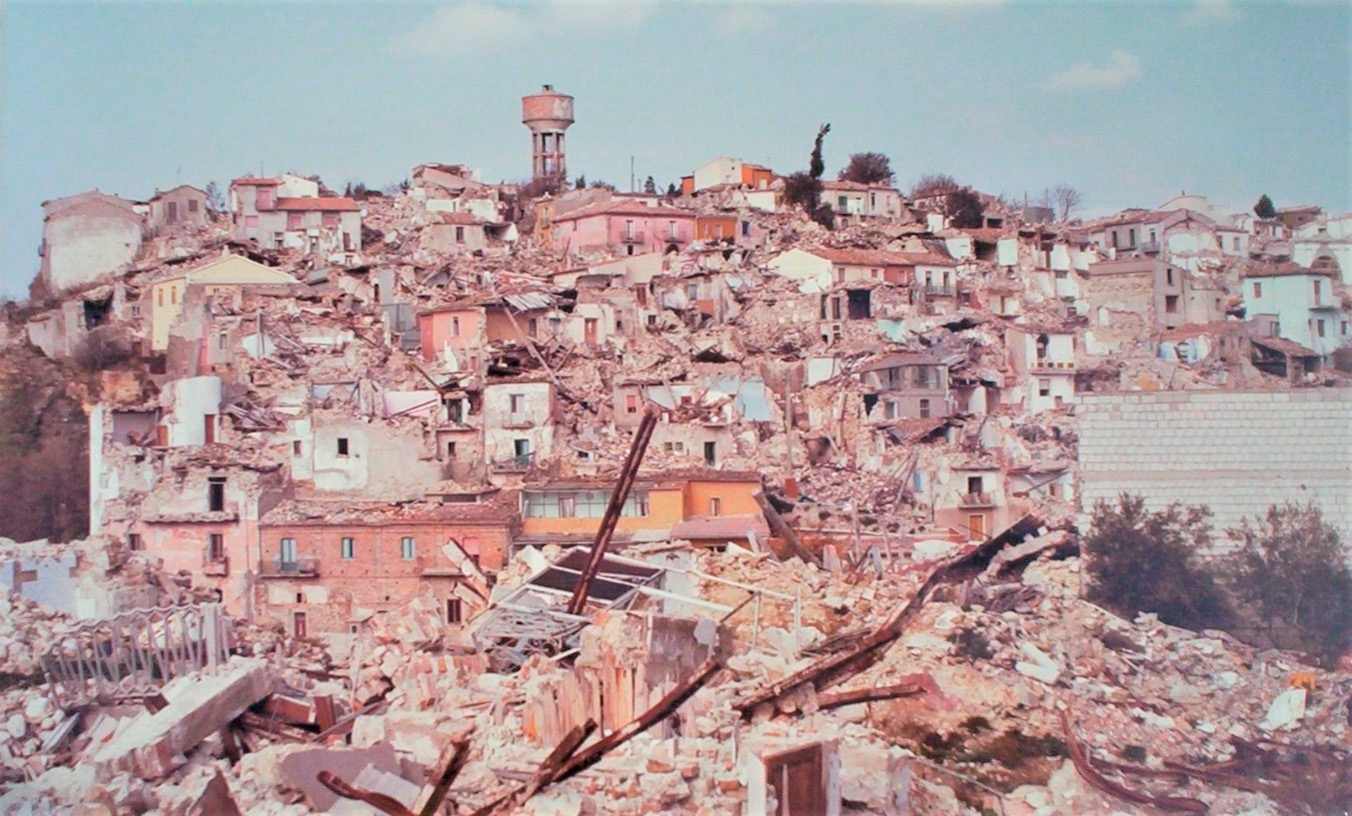
1980 Irpinia earthquake

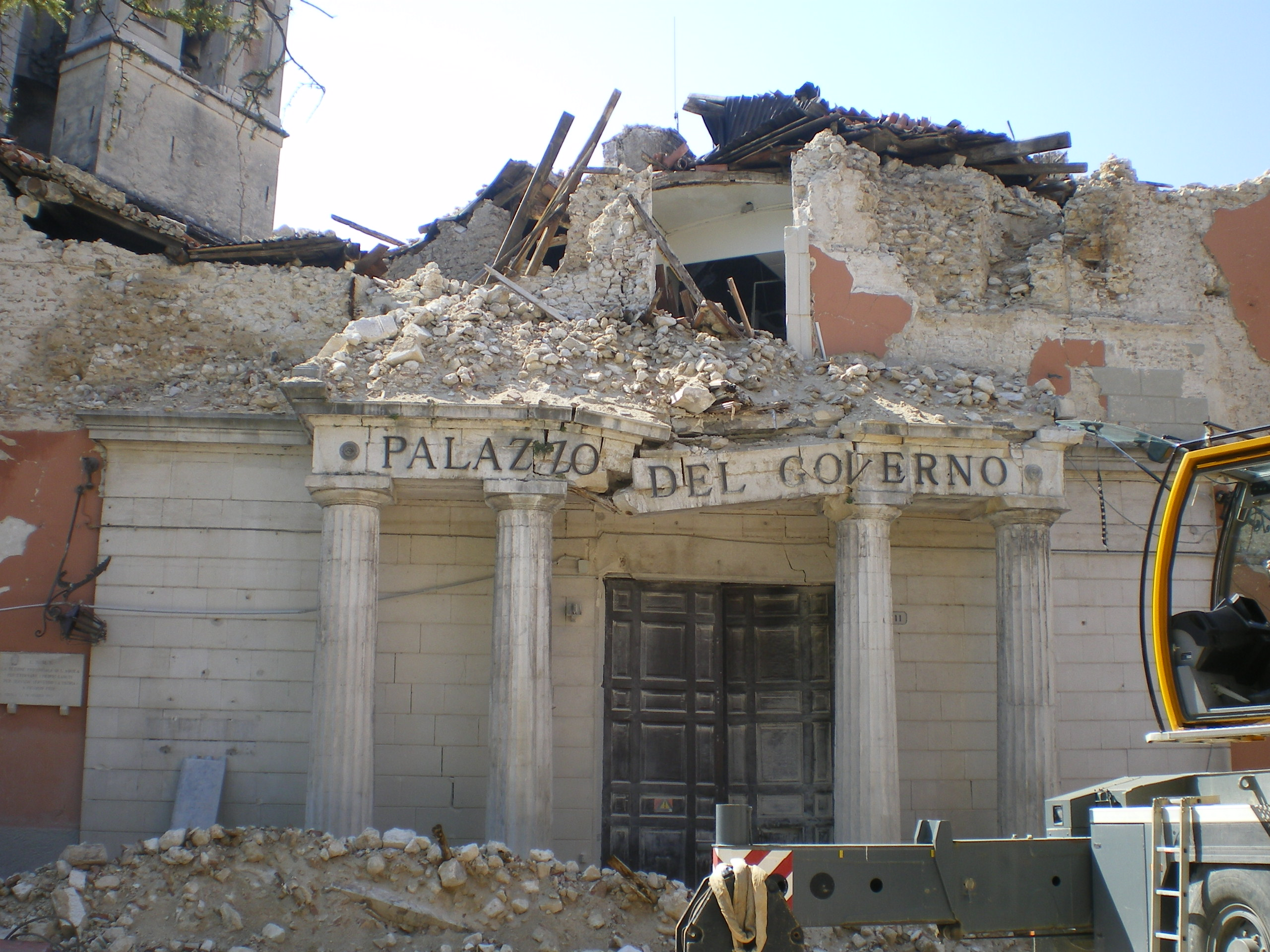
2009 L'Aquila earthquake

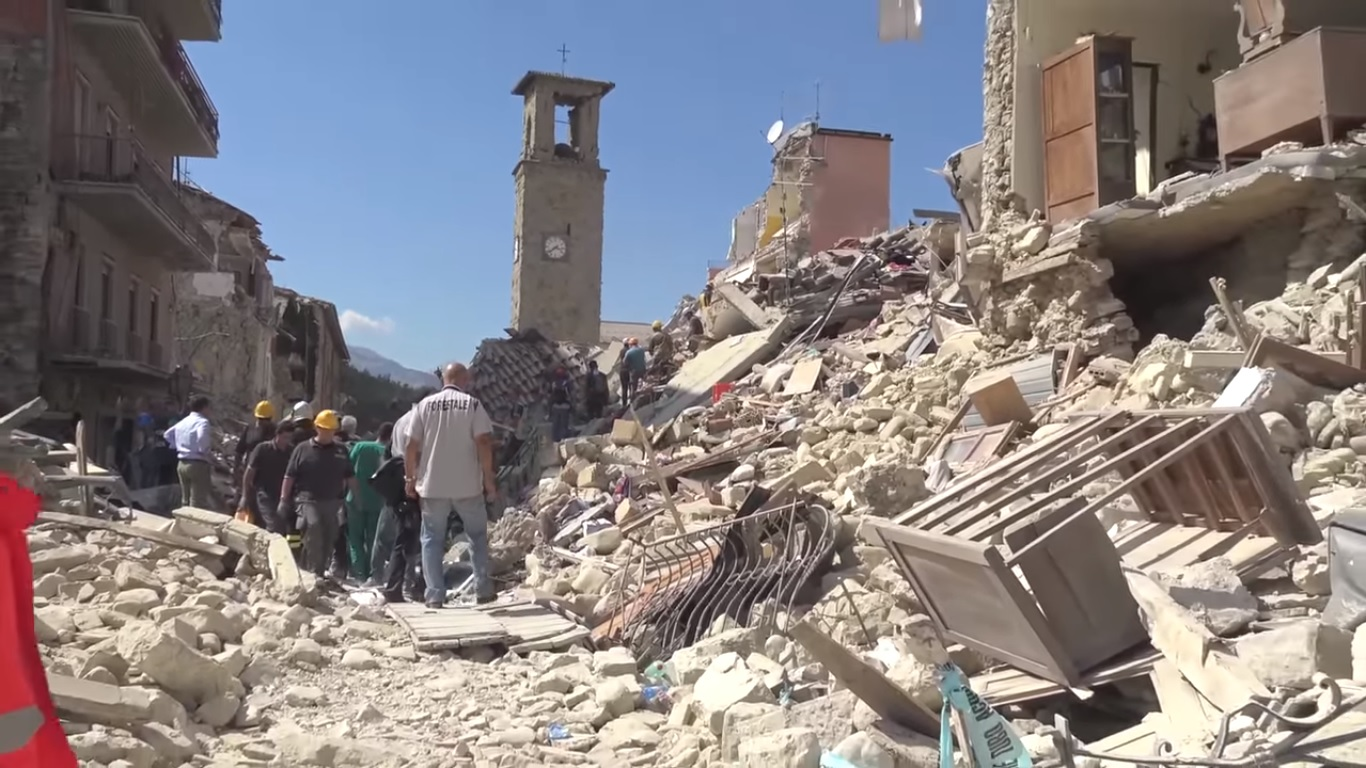
2016 Central Italy earthquake

== See also ==
- Geology of Italy
- List of earthquakes in Albania
- List of earthquakes in Croatia
- List of earthquakes in Greece
