= 1936 Cansiglio earthquake =

Earthquake in Italy

- Location within Italy
- UTC time: 1936-10-18 03:10:07
- ISC event: 903883
- USGS-ANSS: ComCat
- Local date: 18 October 1936
- Local time: 4.10 a.m.
- Magnitude: 5.9 M_{L}
- Epicenter: 46.03°N 12.48°E
- Areas affected: Italy, Cansiglio
- Max. intensity: MMI IX (Violent)
- Casualties: 19

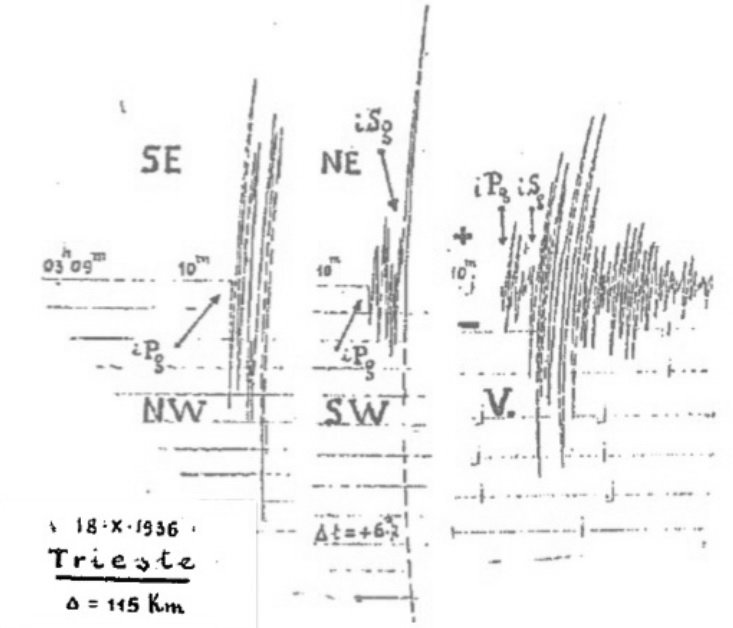
Seismogram of the Cansiglio earthquake, recorded in Trieste

The 1936 Cansiglio earthquake occurred on 18 October in the region between the provinces of Belluno, Treviso and Pordenone, in northern Italy. It caused 19 deaths and an unknown number of injuries.

== Earthquake ==
The main shock came a few hours before dawn, at 4.10 a.m. with its epicenter on the Cansiglio plateau, near the towns of Fiaschetti, Stevenà and Villa di Villa. It was preceded a few hours earlier by a small foreshock.

The earthquake was moderate in magnitude (5.9 on the Richter scale) but was rated as IX (Violent) on the Mercalli intensity scale. The towns near the epicenter received extensive damage, most of their buildings were made uninhabitable or destroyed. The Cansiglio plateau is an agricultural high plain, where buildings were mostly made of poor materials using traditional construction techniques.

The earthquake was felt in the whole of northern and central Italy, as well as in Slovenia, Austria and Switzerland. While some sources report no casualties, other official sources list 19 dead. Aftershocks came frequently for a few days, and lasted until March 1937.

The hypocenter was estimated as 15–18 km, much shallower than the 37–51 km range for other earthquakes in the area. The estimate is disputed, and a revised estimate of 43 km was calculated in 1946 using a macroseismic approach. Later studies have generally supported the initial depth estimate.

The region north of Cansiglio, called Conca d'Alpago, also experienced severe damage. Fifty to seventy percent of the buildings in the towns of Puos d'Alpago and Cornei received critical damage and became unfit for use.

The quake caused damage in Sacile, Vittorio Veneto and in the valleys of Livenza and Meschio rivers, with most of the residential buildings receiving some degree of damage. Belluno, Conegliano and San Vito al Tagliamento, along with other 40 minor towns, reported some damage and a few collapsed buildings. The cities of Bolzano and Venice showed minor affects, mostly collapsed plaster and chimneys.

In Vittorio Veneto the Ceneda district was badly hit, four building collapsed, 40 critically damaged and over 300 in need of restoration works. The Seminary received so much damage it had to be partially demolished. Severe damage was sustained by many public buildings, including the Cathedral, the Carabinieri headquarter, the Tax Office and the town hall. Total damage was assessed at 4 million lire. Due to the high damage sustained, Vittorio Veneto was later added, along with some nearby comuni to the list of town subject to seismic risk.

The rebuilding, overseen by the city prefect Aldo Marinotti, was slow, and took over two years to start.

== Previous events ==
On 29 June 1873 an earthquake struck the area, its epicenter on the Alpago basin, damaging many towns and cities including Belluno and its province, where 40 people died. 54 other casualties were reported, including 38 people killed by the collapse of a church in San Pietro di Feletto during the morning mass.

== See also ==
- List of earthquakes in 1936
- List of earthquakes in Italy
