= 2018 Molise earthquakes =

Earthquakes in Italy

2018 Molise earthquake
- Location within Italy
- UTC time: 2018-08-15 19:10:00
- Local date: 15 August 2018
- Local time: 19:00
- Magnitude: 4.7, 5.2, 4.5 M_{w}
- Epicenter: 41°54′N 14°50′E
- Areas affected: Italy

The 2018 Molise earthquake hit the Italian regions of Molise on 15 August at 19:15:00 (UTC).

== 25 April 2018 ==
The earthquake measured 4.2 on the Richter scale and its epicentre was around a kilometer from the town of Acquaviva di Collecroce, in the province of Campobasso in Molise.

== 15 August 2018 ==
First an earthquake of magnitude 4.7 hit the region. The epicenter was recorded 6 kilometers from Montecilfone, at a depth of 19 kilometers. It is the same epicenter of the shock that took place on 25 April 2018. This is the Acquaviva Collecroce area, 35 kilometers northwest of Campobasso. Then the second shock of 2.3. So much fear among the inhabitants but only slight damage found in Montecilfone. Second magnitude shock 2.3. The second earthquake of magnitude 2.3 has had an epicenter at 5 km southeast of Palata. It took place a few minutes after that of 4.7 with the epicenter of Montecilfone.

In San Giacomo degli Schiavoni people poured into the street. The shock was felt throughout the Molise and throughout the Adriatic coast. But there are no damages, in addition to the slight ones detected at Montecilfone, as the Civil Defense was announced. Even firefighters confirmed: the switchboards have received many calls for information, but no request for action.

The earthquake with its epicenter in Molise was also felt in Naples, in several municipalities of the province and in other areas of Campania. Reports were made especially by people who are on the upper floors of housing.

== 16 August 2018 ==
On 16 August 2018 at 20.19 a short but intense earthquake of magnitude 5.2 occurred. It was followed by several other minor earthquake of replication, with one at 22:22 of magnitude 4.5. The earthquakes had their epicenter in the Montecilfone area. The depth of the earthquake was at 9 kilometers below the surface, and they were felt throughout central Italy, particularly in Abruzzo, Lazio and the Marche, but also in Apulia and Campania. In Naples, there were many fire alarms, but no damage. Fear took hundreds of people out on onto the streets throughout Abruzzo, from Pescara to Chieti, Teramo, L'Aquila, and Vasto. Slight damage was reported to houses in communes near the epicenter of the earthquake at Montecilfone, namely Guglionesi, Palata, Larino, and Tavenna.

== 17 August 2018 ==
On 17 August 2018 at 23:17 an earthquake of magnitude 2.4 occurred. The earthquake had the epicenter of the Guglionesi.

== 18 August 2018 ==
On 18 August 2018 at 00:48 an earthquake of magnitude 3.3 occurred. The earthquake had the epicenter of the Montecilfone.

== 19 August 2018 ==
The earthquake swarm continued in Molise. On 19 August 2018 at 23.48 an earthquake of magnitude 4.6 occurred. The earthquake had the epicenter of the Montecilfone area. The Protezione Civile has carried out hundreds of interventions and checks on houses, bridges and roads in areas hit by earthquake.

== 20 August 2018 ==
On 20 August 2018 at 2:07 an earthquake of magnitude 3 occurred. The earthquake had the epicenter of the Montecilfone area. There are about 190 earthquakes located in the area since August 14, of which 22 of magnitude equal to or greater than 2, the strongest of which is of magnitude 5.1 at 20:19 on August 16, 2018.
Following the earthquake in Molise, at Lanciano (Chieti) in Abruzzo, the Ponte Nuovo on the Sangro river was closed by the Protezione Civile.
The section of the state road Bifernina 647 between the two viaducts that overhang the Liscione dam at Guardialfiera (Campobasso) was closed to transit.

== 21 August 2018 ==
On 21 August 2018 at 00:17 an earthquake of magnitude 3.2 occurred. The earthquake had the epicenter of the Montecilfone area. The water tank of the Municipality of Montecilfone (Campobasso) is dangerous and must be demolished. This is confirmed by Franco Pallotta, mayor of Montecilfone, the epicenter of earthquake.

== See also ==
- List of earthquakes in Italy
