= 1873 Alpago earthquake =

Earthquake in Italy

- Location within Alps
- Local date: 29 June 1873
- Magnitude: 6.3 M_{e}
- Epicenter: 46.167°N 12.383°E
- Areas affected: Italy, Veneto
- Max. intensity: MMI IX (Violent) – MMI X (Extreme)
- Casualties: 80

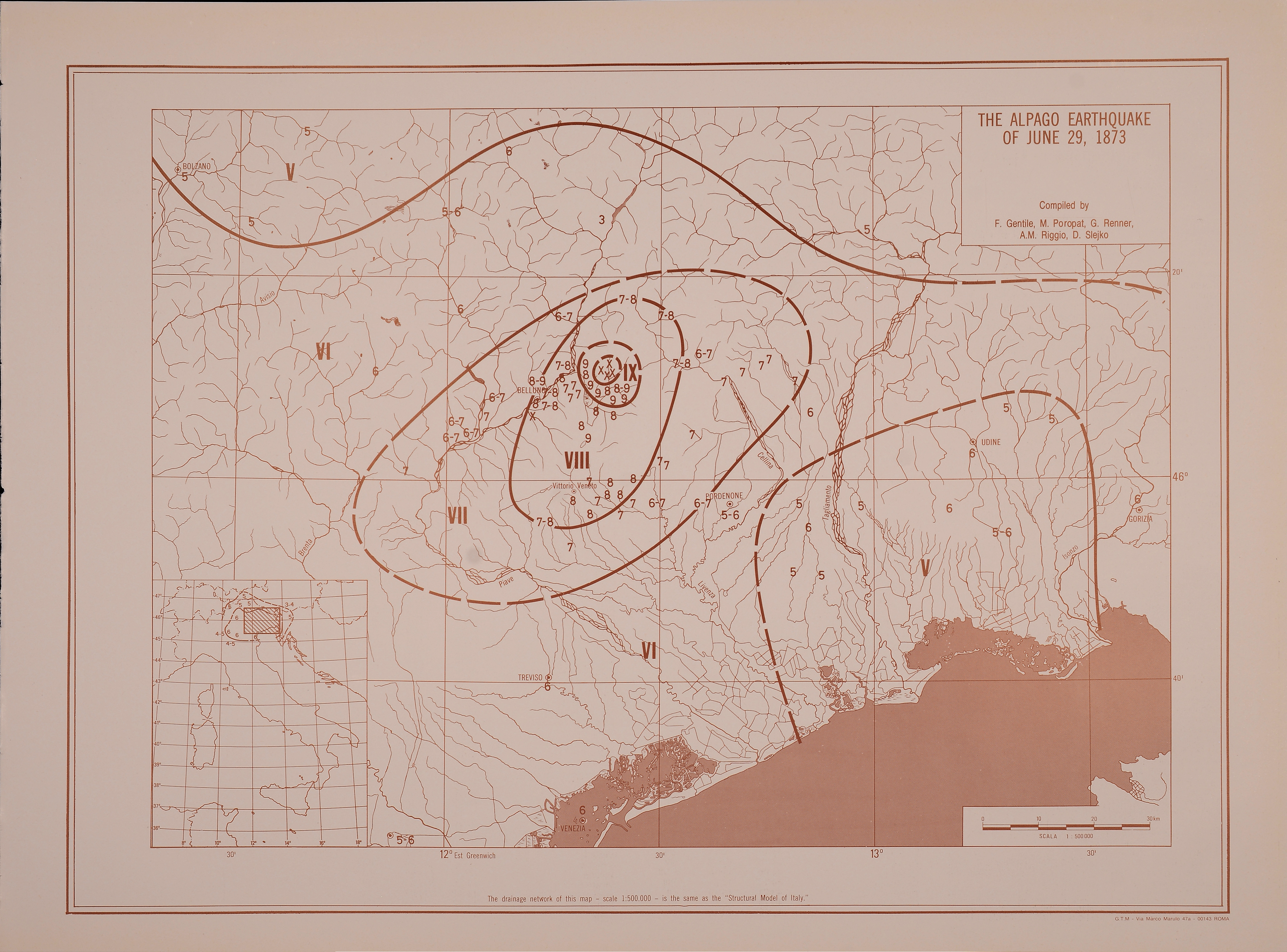
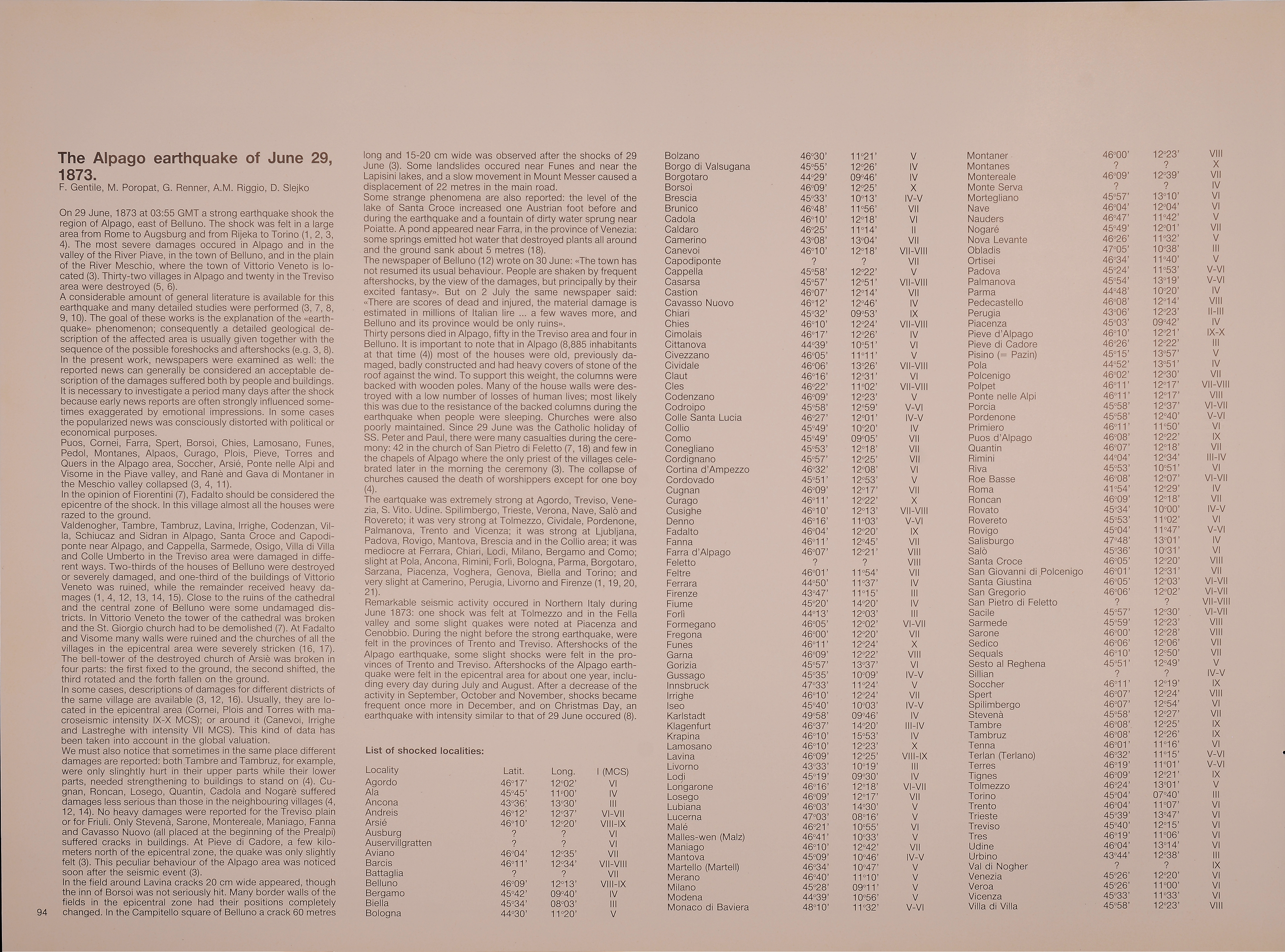
Map and details

The 1873 Alpago earthquake occurred near the Italian city of Belluno on 29 June in the geologically active Alpago Valley of the Veneto region; the zone is rated as two on a four-degree risk scale (one being the highest). The 6.3 magnitude quake was rated as IX–X (Violent–Extreme) on the Mercalli intensity scale. Intensities greater than VII (Very strong) were confined to the provinces of Belluno, Treviso and Pordenone.

== Earthquake ==
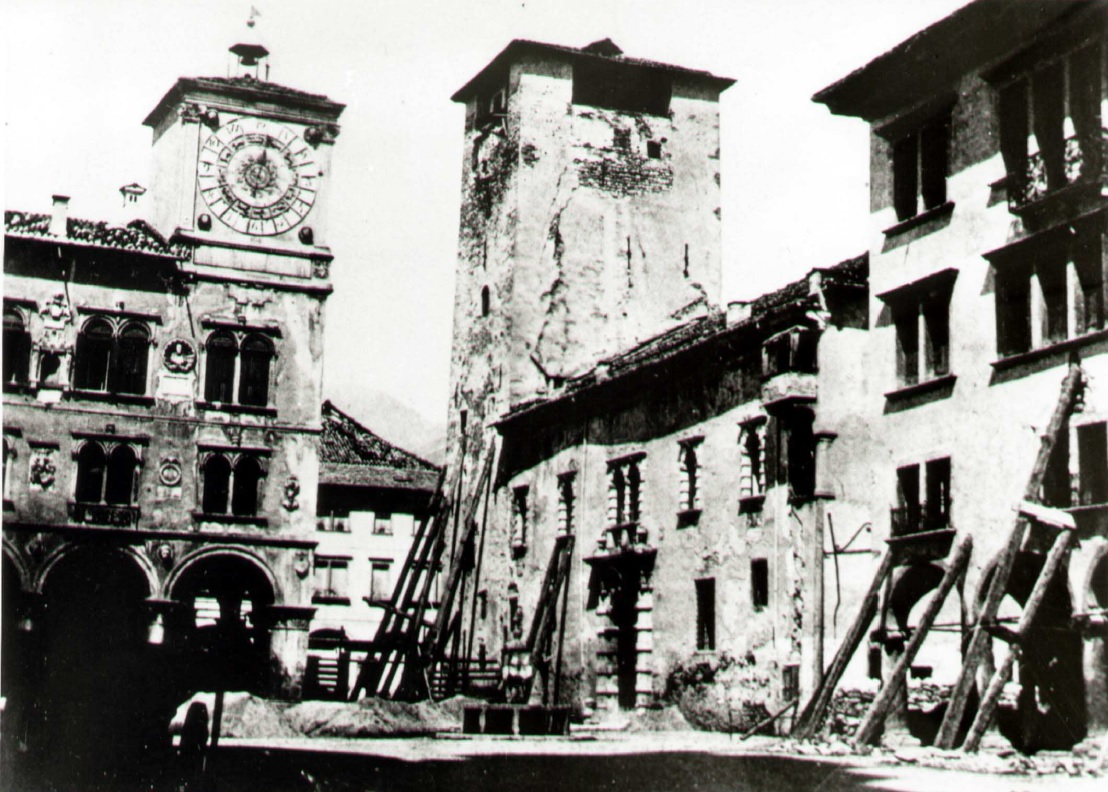
Main square of Belluno after the earthquake

The earthquake struck at 4:29 a.m. on 29 June 1873, a day which was to be a local holiday celebrating Saint Peter and Saint Paul.

The shock was strongly felt in the whole Veneto region, damaging mostly the towns located in the Alpago basin, in Val Lapisina and above the Cansiglio plateau. It was felt as far away as Genova, Marche and Umbria, Slovenia, Austria, Switzerland and Bavaria. The epicenter was at the northern edge of Santa Croce Lake, 12 kilometres (7.5 mi) east of Belluno.

== Casualties and damage ==
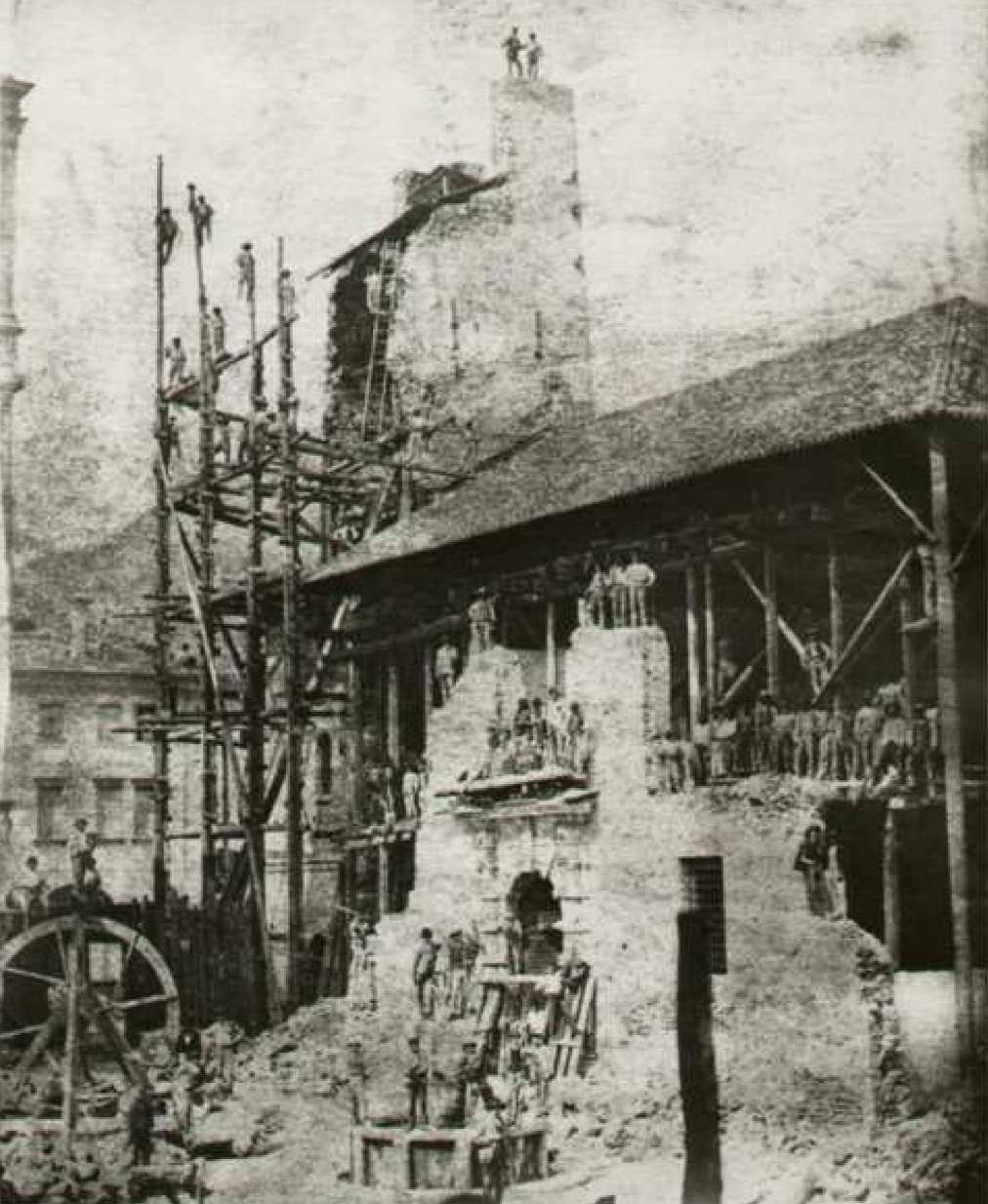
Dismantling the Bishops' Palace in Belluno after the earthquake

Thirty people died in the Alpago area, and ten more in the rest of the Province of Belluno. The towns of Rugolo, Cappella Maggiore, and Sarmede reported 16 casualties, but in San Pietro di Feletto, 38 people perished when the old church's roof collapsed while the morning mass in honor of Saint Peter, the city's saint, was being celebrated.

In the most stricken zones, a third of the buildings were damaged. In Belluno itself, the duomo's apse collapsed. Eight buildings were completely destroyed, another 110 later had to be demolished, 139 needed restoration, and 251 were in need of some work. One church was destroyed, and other seven were damaged. In the city's outskirts, two blocks had to be demolished, 21 houses needed restoration and 219 more received slight damage. No building in the city was left undamaged.

In the surrounding towns, 15 houses collapsed, 66 had to be demolished later, 243 needed restoration and 669 had to be repaired. About 260 houses went unscathed. Four churches were destroyed, and 21 more were severely damaged. The city of Venice sustained minor damage, assessed as 6th degree on the Mercalli scale.

== Discovery of the effect of soil on damage severity ==
In Ceneda, the seminary, the cathedral steeple and San Martino Castle were damaged or destroyed. The nearby town of Serravalle experienced little damage (only the partial collapse of the Turris Nigra, a tower), later explained by the different composition of the underlying soil by seismologists Torquato Taramelli and Giulio Andrea Pirona; the scientists discovered that Serravalle sat above a compact slab of limestone, while Ceneda, just a few kilometers away, rested on soil composed of alluvial conglomerates. This discovery was instrumental in developing the seismic macro-zoning process, a technique used to better assess the risk of damage from earthquakes.

== Relief efforts ==
A public funding subscription was held in Vittorio Veneto, raising 2232,45 lire, while a provincial committee succeeded in raising 26.771,90 lire for the reconstruction. Vittorio Emanuele II, King of Italy, personally committed 1000 lire to the effort.

Authorities reacted quickly to the disaster, asking for help from the Army and the Carabinieri in order to remove the rubble, set up tents and communications, and maintain order among the refugees.

A wood shortage led to delays in the repairs of damaged buildings. In the following weeks, a military brigade was given the task of felling enough trees to meet the needs of reconstruction.

== See also ==
- List of earthquakes in Italy
- List of historical earthquakes
