= 2001 Alto Adige earthquake =

2001 earthquake in northern Italy

- Location within Italy
- UTC time: 2001-07-17 17:06:14
- ISC event: 3240183
- USGS-ANSS: ComCat
- Local date: 17 July 2001
- Local time
- Duration: 7.13 seconds
- Magnitude: M_{w} 4.7 (USGS) M_{d} 4.8 (INGV)
- Depth: 3 km (1.9 mi)
- Epicenter: 46.6260°N 11.0490°E
- Fault: Forst fault
- Type: Strike-slip
- Areas affected: Trentino Alto Adige, Italy
- Max. intensity: MMI VII (Very strong)
- Landslides: Yes
- Foreshocks: At least two, strongest M_{w} 4.1
- Aftershocks: At least five
- Casualties: 4 dead, 5 injured

On 17 July 2001, at 17:06:14 CEST a Moment magnitude (M_{w}) 4.7 earthquake struck the Bolzano province, Trentino-Alto Adige, Italy. The earthquake shaking had a maximum Modified Mercalli intensity of VII (Very strong), and caused four deaths, mostly from landslides, and five other people were injured.

== Tectonic setting ==
The Alto Adige region lies within an area of complex structure, with current seismicity related to ongoing north-south compression between the Adriatic microplate and the larger Eurasian plate. Most of the earthquakes in the area are associated with the Insubric line (Perdiadriatic Seam), which near Merano is formed by the SW-NE trending Giudicarie Line.

== Earthquake ==
The earthquake struck at 17:06:14 on 17 July 2001. It had a magnitude of M_{w} 4.7, according to the USGS, or Duration magnitude (M_{d}) of 4.8 according to the INGV. The earthquake occurred at a depth of 3 km (1.9 mi), and had its epicenter between the towns of Marling and Merano. The earthquake was felt most strongly in Trentino-Alto Adige, where a maximum Mercalli intensity of VII was reached. To a lesser degree it was also felt in Veneto, Friuli Venezia Giulia, Lombardy and the southern portions of Switzerland, Austria and Germany. The earthquake is thought to have been caused by movement on the SW-NE trending Forst fault, which runs parallel to the Insubric line, formed by the northern end of the North Giudicarie fault near Merano. The focal mechanism is consistent with sinistral (left lateral) slip on a SW-NE trending, near vertical, strike-slip fault.

== Impact ==
The earthquake triggered multiple landslides, including one near Gargazon that impacted a gorge of the Eschio river killing two hikers, one in Partschins that destroyed the Maso Prantl mountain refuge, and one in St. Leonhard in Passeier that razed a beech forest. The wife of the governor of Bolzano province Luis Durnwalder died after falling from her horse, that got scared by the quake. In Merano objects fell from shelves in grocery stores and various buildings received minor damage. The church of Holy Mary in Riffian was severely damaged. Some old buildings had partial collapses in Bolzano, including an old pinnacle in the city center, from which marble balls fell off and damaged a car. Five people were injured during evacuations and by falling debris. An old woman also died from an heart attack. Damage was also reported at the Museo Statale del Castello del Tirolo. The quake was also felt in southern Austria and Germany.

== Foreshocks and aftershocks ==
A list of the main foreshocks and aftershocks of the earthquake.

Date (YYYY-MM-DD)	Time (local)	Epicenter	M_{L}
2001-05-31	12:09	Naturns, Trentino-Alto Adige	4.1
2001-06-13	23:00	Schenna, Trentino-Alto Adige	3.6
2001-07-17	17:06	Between Marling and Merano	4.7
2001-07-18	17:35	Lana, South Tyrol	3.9
2001-07-27	09:05	Merano, Trentino-Alto Adige	3.7
2001-07-28	03:34	Naturns, Trentino-Alto Adige	3.8
2001-08-18	19:00	St. Leonhard in Passeier, Trentino-Alto Adige	3.4
2001-09-25	10:07	Sarntal, Trentino-Alto Adige	3.5

== See also ==
- List of earthquakes in Italy
