= Placido Fabris =

Italian painter

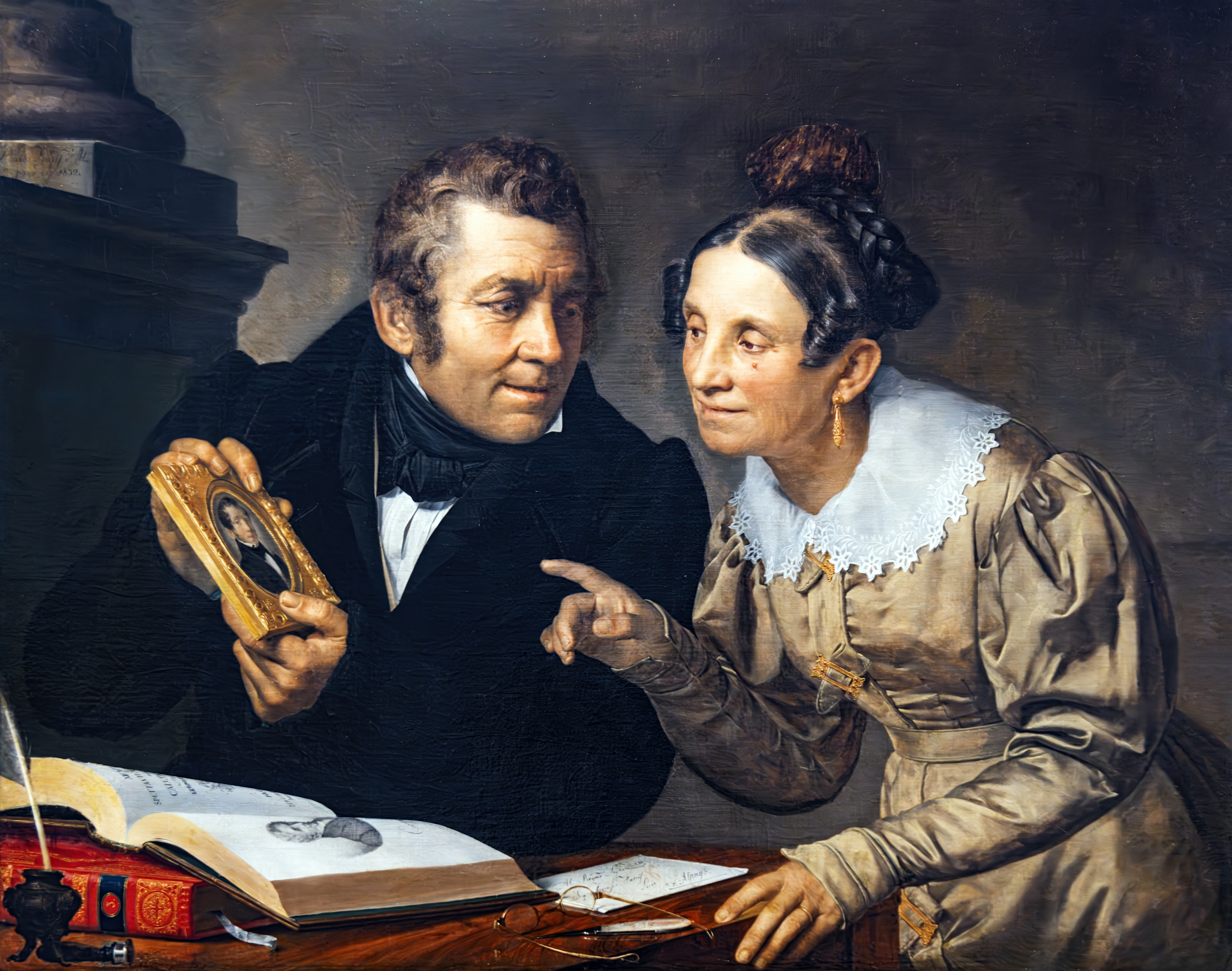
Portrait of the artist's parents - Gallerie dell'Accademia

Placido Fabris (Pieve d'Alpago, near Belluno, 26 August 1802 – Venice, 1 December 1859) was an Italian painter who lived and worked primarily in the Austrian Empire.

He was a pupil of the Academy of Fine Arts of Venice, and was involved in creating restorations and copies for churches in Venice
