= Fabricius Caracciolo, Duke of Girifalco =

Italian noble

Duke Fabricius Caracciolo
- Duke of Girifalco
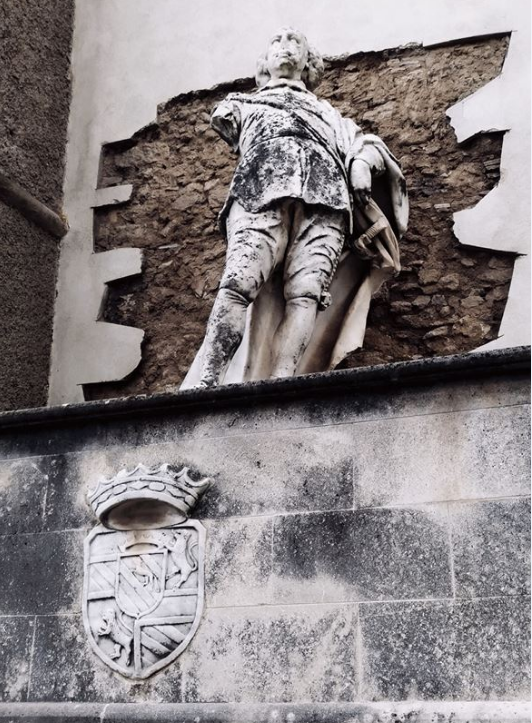
- Statue of Caracciolo at the Ducal Palace of Girifalco
- Born: 24 September 1607; Girifalco, Kingdom of Naples
- Died: 22 November 1683 (aged 76) probably Girifalco
- Noble family: House of Caracciolo
- Spouse: Felicia Maria Ravaschieri
- Issue: Maria Virginia
- Father: Annibale Caracciolo
- Mother: Virginia Ravaschieri

Fabricius Caracciolo, 2nd Duke of Girifalco (Italian: Fabrizio Caracciolo, Secondo Duca di Girifalco; 24 September 1607 - 22 November 1683) was an Italian nobleman, soldier, magistrate and prefect.

== Early life ==
Fabrizio was born in the Ducal Palace of Girifalco, the 3rd child of Hannibal Caracciolo, Baron of Girifalco, and Virginia Ravaschieri. Very little is known about his childhood. He likely spent most of his youth residing in the palace of his birth. In 1624, his mother was elevated to the rank of Duchess by Philip IV of Spain.

== Marriage ==
In 1628, at the age of 21 he married his maternal first cousin, Marchioness Felicia Maria Ravaschieri of Soreto The couple would have their only child, Maria Virginia Caracciolo, in 1630.

== Ascension to Dukedom ==
In 1634 Caraciollo's mother passed away, thus making the 27-year old become the Second Duke of Girifalco. His loyalty to the Viceroyalty of Naples, demonstrated in the revolt of 1647-1648, earned him the appointment as regent of the Grand Court of the Vicariate from 12 July 1653 to 22 January 1665, a position almost solely granted to Spaniards. He would rule for 49 years, until his death in 1683.

In 1665 he was charged with supervising the funeral of King Philip IV of Spain, being in his council of state. In 1667 he was created governor of Messina, and after 1670 he was commander of the military garrison of Pizzofalcone, succeeding Daniele Ravaschieri, Prince of Belmonte. He was deeply trusted by the Viceroy of Naples Pedro Antonio d'Aragona, and was part of his entourage, in 1671, during a diplomatic trip to Rome to Pope Clement X whom he had met personally when the latter was apostolic nuncio in Naples. In 1680 the Viceroy Ferdinando Fajardo di Toledo appointed him Grassiere, the highest office of the magistracy, prefect of the public food supply.

== Death ==
He died on September 22, 1683, at the age of 76. He was succeeded by his grandson, Nicola Maria Caracciolo, 3rd Duke of Girifalco (1653–1736).

== See also ==
- Calabria
- Girifalco
- Kingdom of Naples
