= List of tsunamis in Europe =

The following is a list of notable tsunamis in Europe.

The aftermath of the Messina earthquake and tsunami on December 28, 1908

== Causes ==
Most of the tsunamis that have occurred within Europe have happened in the Mediterranean Sea because in the Mediterranean Sea there are earthquakes, submarine landslide and volcanoes. Most of the earthquakes occur on the Eurasian plate but earthquakes and submarine landslide also occur in western Europe like France, Norway and the United Kingdom which have been struck by tsunamis.

== Tsunamis ==
| Date | Country | Dead | Cause | Notes |
|---|---|---|---|---|
| ~6225-6170 BC | Scotland, United Kingdom | Unknown | Underwater landslide | Storegga Slide, Norway |
| 6000 BC | Sicily, Italy | Unknown | Volcanic eruption | |
| 3500 BC | (United Kingdom) Northern Isles | Many | Tsunami | Unclear |
| 1410 BC | Santorini, Greece | Unknown | Volcanic eruption | |
| 426 BC | Gulf of Euboea, Greece | Unknown | Earthquake | 426 BC Malian Gulf tsunami |
| 373 BC | Helike, Greece | Unknown | Earthquake | An earthquake and a tsunami destroyed the prosperous Greek city Helike, lying 2 km away from the sea. The fate of the city, which remained permanently submerged, was often commented upon by ancient writers and may have inspired Plato when writing his story of Atlantis in Timaeus and Critias. |
| 227 BC | Dodecanese, Greece | Unknown | Earthquake | 226 BC Rhodes earthquake |
| 210 BC | Gulf of Cádiz, Portugal | Unknown | Earthquake | |
| 79 AD | Gulf of Naples, Italy | Unknown | Volcanic eruption | A smaller tsunami was witnessed in the Bay of Naples by Pliny the Younger during the eruption of Mount Vesuvius. |
| 21 July 365 | Crete, Greece | Thousands | 8.0 earthquake | 365 Crete earthquake |
| 7 July 551 | Menidi, Aetolia-Acarnania, Greece | Unknown | Earthquake | |
| 15 August 554 | Kos, Greece | Unknown | Earthquake | |
| 24 October 842 | Channel Islands United Kingdom | Unknown | Earthquake | |
| 1050 | Santorini, Greece | Unknown | Volcanic eruption | |
| 11 November 1099 | Cornwall, United Kingdom, | Unknown | Unknown | |
| 1 October 1134 | North Sea, United Kingdom, Netherlands | Unknown | Unknown | |
| 4 February 1169 | Strait of Messina, Italy, | Unknown | Earthquake | |
| 11 May 1222 | Cyprus | Unknown | Earthquake | |
| 8 August 1303 | Crete, Greece | Thousands | 8.0 earthquake | 1303 Crete earthquake |
| 25 November 1343 | Tyrrhenian Sea, Italy | Loss of lives recorded unknown number. | Earthquake | |
| 5 December 1456 | Province of Benevento, Italy | 30,000–70,000 | Earthquake | Largest earthquake to strike Italy. |
| 3 May 1481 | Rhodes, Greece | Unknown | Earthquake | |
| 6 April 1580 | Strait of Dover, United Kingdom | 120 | Earthquake/Underwater landslide | The 5.9 earthquake caused freak waves in the Strait of Dover which were observed in England and France. |
| 30 January 1607 | Bristol Channel, United Kingdom | 2,000 | disputed tsunami caused by earthquake off Ireland | |
| 27 March 1638 | Sicily, Italy | 9,581–30,000 | Earthquake | |
| 6 April 1667 | Adriatic Sea, Croatia | Unknown | Earthquake | The tsunami struck the city of Dubrovnik. |
| 9 October 1680 | Alboran Sea, Spain | Unknown | Unknown | |
| 11 January 1693 | Italy | 1000 | Earthquake | |
| 1693 | Iceland | Unknown | Volcanic earthquake | |
| 21 February 1723 | Lefkada, Greece | Unknown | Earthquake | |
| 20 February 1743 | Apulia, Italy | 180–300 | Earthquake | |
| 14 May 1748 | Gulf of Patras, Greece | Unknown | Earthquake | |
| 7 July 1757 | Isles of Scilly, United Kingdom | Unknown | Earthquake | |
| 21 January 1760 | Baltic Sea, Denmark, Germany | Unknown | Underwater landslide | |
| 5 September 1767 | Dublin Republic of Ireland | Unknown | Unknown | |
| February 5, February 6, February 7, March 1, March 28, 1783 | Calabria, Italy | 50,000 | Earthquakes | |
| 1 November 1755 | Lisbon, Portugal | 10,000 | Earthquake | |
| 31 March 1761 | Lisbon, Portugal | Unknown | Earthquake | Moderate tsunami observed in Cornwall and Barbados. |
| 18 September 1763 | Weymouth, Dorset, United Kingdom | Unknown | Unknown | |
| 2 April 1808 | Coast, Italy | Unknown | Earthquake | An earthquake in Italy caused a possible tsunami that was observed in Marseille, France. |
| 23 August 1817 | Gulf of Corinth, Greece | Unknown | Earthquake | |
| 29 December 1820 | Zakynthos, Greece | Unknown | Earthquake | |
| 5 July 1843 | Cornwall, United Kingdom | Unknown | Unknown | |
| 12 October 1856 | Crete, Greece | Unknown | Earthquake | |
| 19 September 1867 | Ionian Sea Greece | 12 | Earthquake | |
| 3 April 1881 | Chios, Greece | 7,866 | Earthquake | |
| 27 August 1886 | Ionian Sea, Greece | Unknown | Earthquake | |
| 23 February 1887 | Ligurian Sea, France | Unknown | Earthquake | |
| 14 June 1893 | Adriatic Sea, Albania | Unknown | 7.5 earthquake | |
| 31 March 1901 | Black Sea, Bulgaria | 0 | 7.2 earthquake | |
| 16 January 1905 | Loen, Norway | 61 | Landslide | |
| 8 September 1905 | Calabria, Italy | 557 | Earthquake | |
| 28 December 1908 | Messina, Italy | 80,000 | 7.1 earthquake | |
| 11 September 1930 | Italy | 2 | Earthquake | |
| 26 September 1932 | Ierissos, Greece | 491 | Earthquake | 1932 Ierissos earthquake |
| 7 April 1934 | Tafjord Norway | 40 | Landslide | |
| 13 September 1936 | Loen, Norway | 74 | Landslide | |
| September 10, 1953 | Paphos, Cyprus | 40 | Earthquake | |
| 9 July 1956 | Aegean Islands Greece | 3 | Earthquake | |
| 9 July 1956 | Dodecanese Greece | 56 | Earthquake | |
| 9 October 1963 | Monte Toc, Italy | 1,450 | Landslide | |
| 28 February 1969 | Portugal | 0 | Earthquake | |
| 21 June 1978 | Vela Luka, Croatia | 0 | Meteorologic | |
| 16 October 1979 | Nice, France | 8-23 | Landslide and underwater landslide | |
| 1 January 1980 | Azores, Portugal | 0 | Earthquake | |
| 13 December 1990 | Italy | 6 | Earthquake | |
| 30 December 2002 | Stromboli, Italy | 0 | Landslide | |
| 21 May 2003 | Balearic Islands, Spain | 0 | Earthquake | The earthquake was off the coast of Algeria. |
| 29 June 2011 | Cornwall, United Kingdom | 0 | Underwater landslide | |
| 30 October 2020 | Aegean Islands, Greece | 1 | Earthquake | A magnitude 7.0 earthquake struck off the coast of Turkey, producing a 2.2 meter-high tsunami that would later strike the coast of Turkey, and the Aegean Islands, including Ikaria, Kos, Chios, and Samos. |

== See also ==
- Tsunamis affecting the British Isles
- List of tsunamis
