= List of earthquakes in Albania =

Map of earthquakes in Albania 1900– (map data)
Epicentres of major earthquakes in Albania with year of occurrence since 1900

This is an incomplete list of earthquakes in Albania:

Date	Location	Mag.	Depth	MMI	Deaths	Injuries	Notes	Ref
2024-01-13	Lushnjë, Fier County	4.4 M_{w}	10.0	VI	1			
2022-01-14	Fushë-Arrëz, Shkoder	4.3 M_{w}	10.0	VI			Minor damage	
2021-10-29	Bulqizë, Dibër	4.7 M_{w}	10.0	VI			16 houses damaged	
2019-11-26	Mamurras, Durrës	6.4 M_{w}	20.0	VIII	51	3,000+	Widespread damage	
2019-09-21	Shijak, Durrës	5.6 M_{w}	10.0	VII		108		
2019-06-01	Korçë	5.2 M_{w}	10.0	V		5	More than 100 houses damaged	
2018-08-11	Dibër	5.1 M_{w}	10.0	V			67 homes were damaged	
2014-05-19	Cërrik, Elbasan	5.0 M_{w}	10.0	VI			50 homes and one school were damaged	
2007-04-16	Elbasan	4.5 M_{w}	13.7	V			Minor damage	
2006-06-13	Gjirokaster	4.5 M_{w}	10.0	V		1	Minor damage	
1988-01-09	Tirana	5.9 M_{w}	24.0	VII		Some	188 buildings were damaged	
1985-11-21	Lezhe	5.5 M_{w}	24.6	VI			Minor damage	
1982-11-16	Fier	5.6 M_{w}	21.0	VIII	1	12	Extensive damage	
1979-04-15	Bar, Lezhë, Shkodër	6.9 M_{w}	10.0	X	136	1,000+	35 fatalities in Albania	
1967-11-30	Dibër	6.7 M_{w}	20.0	X	18			
1962-03-18	Fier	6.1 M_{w}	26.4	VII	5	77	1,000 houses collapsed.	
1960-05-26	Korce	6.2 M_{w}	20.0	VII	7	127		
1959-09-01	Fier	6.2 M_{w}	20.0	X	2			
1948-08-27	Shkodër	5.7 M_{w}		VIII	1	27	Serious damage reported in Trush.	
1942-08-27	Diber	6.0	33.0		43	110		
1930-12-02	Vlore	5.0	4.0	IX	25			
1930-11-21	Vlore	6.0 M_{w}	35.0	IX	35	108	980 Homes were destroyed	
1920-11-26	Gjirokastër, Tepelenë	6.2 M_{w}	25.0	XI	200		Severe damage	
1919-12-22	Leskovik, Konicë	6.1		VIII			Many houses collapsed	
1911-02-18	Korçë, Lake Ohrid	6.7 M_{w}		IX	Many		Serious damage in the region around Lake Ohrid	
1905-06-01	Shkodër	6.6 M_{w}		IX	200	500	Major damage	
1893-06-14	Himara			IX			All buildings destroyed	
1855 July – August	Shkodër County			VIII			Destruction of Bushat, Juban, Kozmac and Vau Dejes villages	
1851-10-17	Berat			IX	400		400 soldiers were buried under the partially collapsed town fortress	
1851-10-12	Vlorë			IX	200			
1743-02-20	Salento	7.1 M_{w}		X	180–300		Destructive tsunami affecting Albanian coastline.	
1273-07-14	Durrës				Many			
1267 July	Durrës						The earthquake lasted for quite some time until nothing was left standing	
Note: The inclusion criteria for adding events are based on WikiProject Earthquakes' notability guideline that was developed for stand alone articles. The principles described also apply to lists. In summary, only damaging, injurious, or deadly events should be recorded.

== See also ==
- Geology of Albania
- List of earthquakes in Greece
- List of earthquakes in Croatia
- List of earthquakes in Italy
- List of earthquakes in 2019
