= 1893 Vlorë earthquake =

Earthquake in Albania

- Location within Albania
- Local date: 14 June 1893
- Magnitude: 6.6 M_{w}
- Depth: 6.6 km (4 mi)
- Epicenter: 40.2°N 19.7°E
- Areas affected: Vlorë County, Albania
- Max. intensity: MMI XI (Extreme)
- Casualties: Unknown

The 1893 Vlorë earthquake occurred on 14 June, in Vlorë County, Albania. It had an estimated moment magnitude of 6.6 occurring at 6.6 km (4 mi) depth and had a maximum Modified Mercalli intensity of XI (Extreme).

== Impact ==
Casualties from the earthquake are unknown. Kudhës village (Himarë) was completely destroyed and most residential buildings in Kuç village (Vlorë) were damaged. The mountain slope areas from Himarë to Fushë Bardha villages (Gjirokastër region) at 5 localities (Himarë, Kudhës, Çorraj, Fterë and Fushë Bardh villages) were affected by numerous rockfalls. Cracking and lateral spreading occurred on the hill slope in Kudhës village. The earthquake was also felt in Apulia, Italy.

== See also ==
- List of earthquakes in Albania
