= 1626 Girifalco earthquake =

- Location within Italy
- Local date: April 5, 1626
- Local time: 12:45
- Magnitude: 6.0 M_{e}
- Epicenter: 38.852°N 16.456°E
- Fault: Stalettì-Squillace-Maida fault system
- Areas affected: Girifalco, Catanzaro, Kingdom of Naples
- Max. intensity: MMI X (Extreme)
- Foreshocks: yes
- Casualties: 11–100

The 1626 Girifalco earthquake occurred on April 5 at 12:45. It was the strongest earthquake in a sequence that lasted from March 27 through to October of that year. It had an estimated magnitude of 6.0 M_{e} and a maximum perceived intensity of X (Extreme) on the Modified Mercalli scale. It caused widespread destruction in Girifalco and Catanzaro, then part of the Kingdom of Naples. There is no precise estimate for the number of casualties, but it is thought to lie in the range 11–100. The earthquake may have been caused by movement on the NW-SE trending Stalettì-Squillace-Maida fault system.
