= 1743 Salento earthquake =

Earthquake in Italy

- Location within Balkans
- Local date: 20 February 1743
- Local time: 23:30 IST
- Magnitude: 7.1 M_{w}
- Epicenter: 39.847°N 18.774°E
- Areas affected: Italy, Greece, Malta and Albania
- Max. intensity: MMI IX (Violent)
- Tsunami: 11 m (36 ft)
- Casualties: 180–300 dead

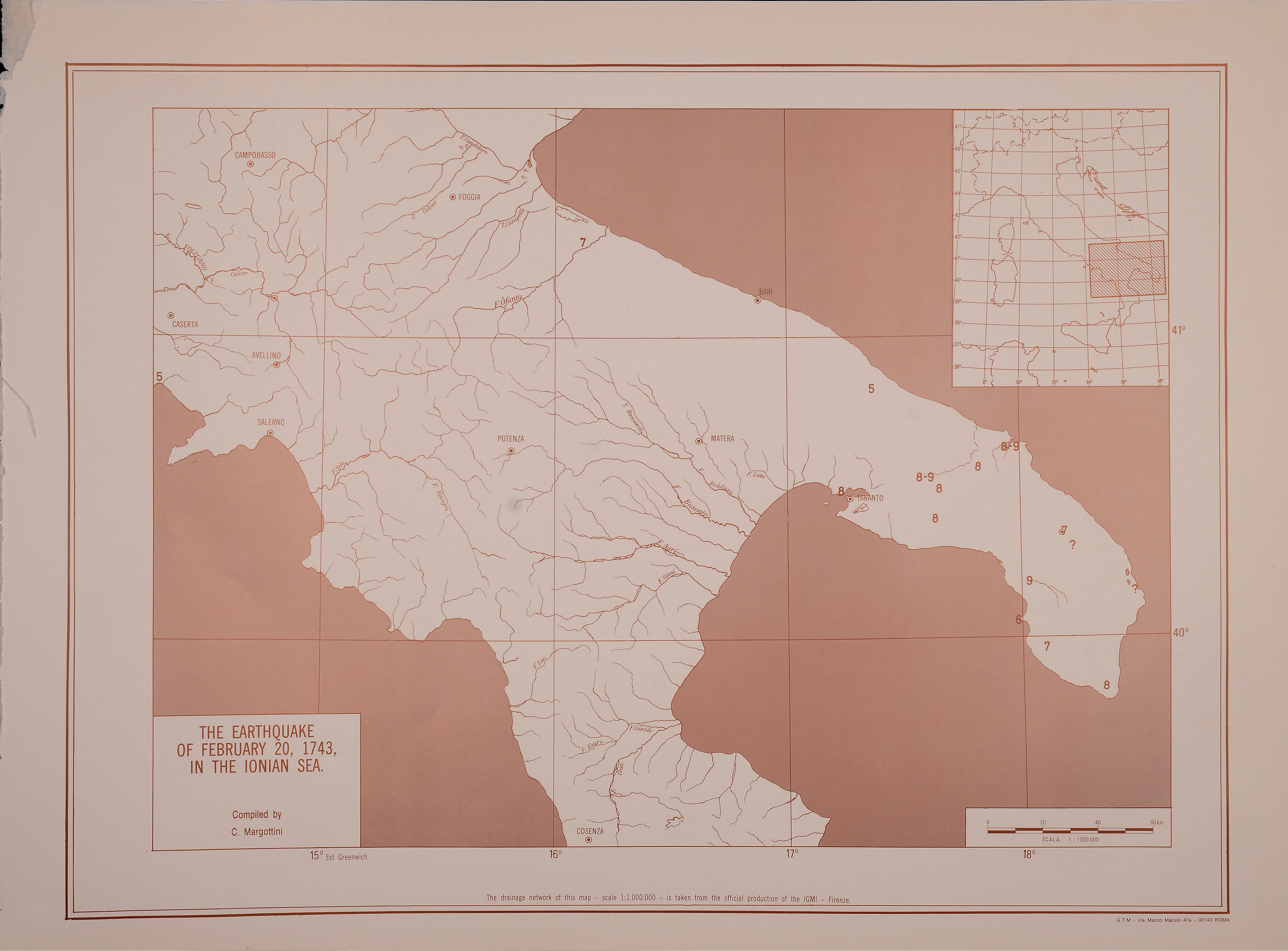
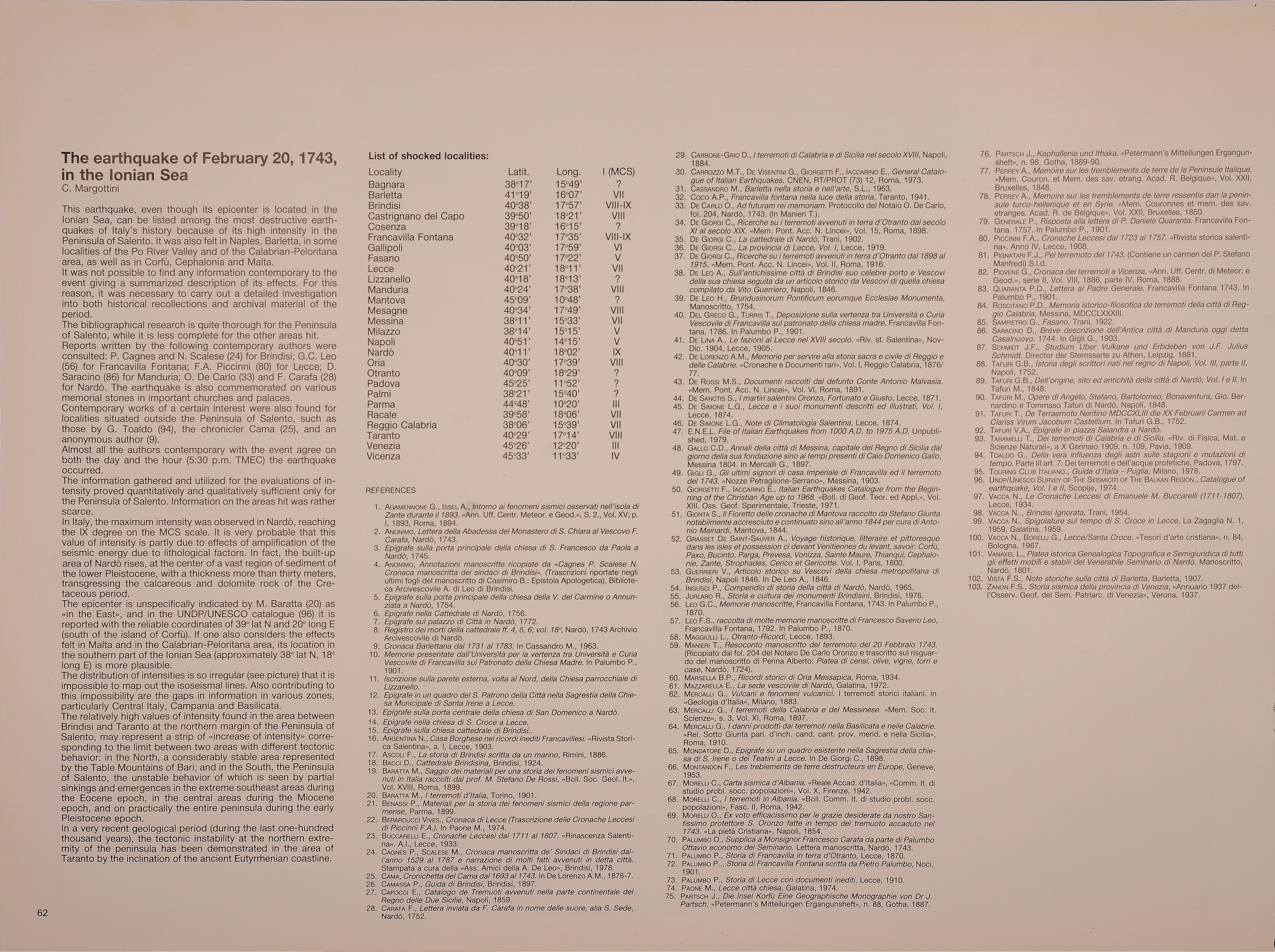
Isoseismal map and description of the earthquake - Atlas of isoseismal maps of Italian earthquakes CNR

The 1743 Salento earthquake affected the Apulian region of southwestern Italy on 20 February at 23:30 IST. The ~7.1 M_{w} earthquake had an epicenter in the Adriatic and Ionian seas, off the coast of modern-day Lecce and Brindisi provinces in Salento. It had a maximum Modified Mercalli intensity of IX (Violent), causing heavy damage in Nardò. Damage was also reported across the sea, in the Balkans. The earthquake also generated a tsunami of up to 11 meters in run-up. Between 180 and 300 people were killed in the disaster.

== Tectonic setting ==
The tectonics of southern Italy is highly influenced by the subduction of the Ionian Sea oceanic crust along the Calabrian Arc in the southwest of the peninsula. To the northeast, along the west coast of the Adriatic Sea (Balkans), is the Hellenides thrust zone. This region of the Mediterranean Sea forms part of the complex convergent boundary between the Eurasian and African plates, where it is broken up into smaller microplates moving independently. As a result, Apulia and its offshore region is characterized by a zone of northwest–southeast and north-northwest–south-southeast striking extensional faults, as well as east–west striking strike-slip faults.

Earthquakes are more frequent in the northern part of Apulia (Gargano) than compared to Salento in the south. Damaging earthquakes with intensities of VIII or greater has been recorded since the early 13th-century. One of those large earthquakes occurred in July 1627, measuring 6.7 M_{w}. While the Gargano area experiences frequent earthquakes greater than 6.0 M_{w}, the Salento peninsula only sees moderate-sized quakes. The earthquake of 1743 is the strongest known to strike Salento.

== Earthquake ==
In the 20th century, the Taranto Gulf and Strait of Otranto experienced a number of earthquakes of up to 5.0 M_{w}. Two moderate earthquakes in the Strait of Otranto in 1974 and 1976 hinted at a possible location for the 1743 earthquake. The introduction of a modern earthquake monitoring system indicated a northeast–southwest zone of concentrated earthquakes that extends from Salento to Altopiano delle Murge.

The epicenter location of the event is still a debated topic among scientists. Several researchers have placed the epicenter on land on the basis of heavy damage in Nardò, as well as of reported seismic intensities. Most scientists have come to an agreement that the epicenter was around the Strait of Otranto, where two moderate earthquake occurred in the mid-1970s. The discovery of an active fault zone off the coast of Salento supports the hypothesis of an offshore location. Based on the distribution of its intensity, as well as a geological survey of the region, it was concluded that the event occurred on a northwest–southeast striking reverse fault at depths of 30–40 km.

== Impact ==
The earthquake was assigned a maximum intensity of IX–X in Nardò, where it inflicted heavy damage on the town. An estimated 150 of the total 180–300 people killed were reported in this town alone. About one-third of all structures in the town was demolished. The earthquake destroyed many homes, churches and castles. Major destruction also occurred in Brindisi and Francavilla Fontana. Unusually, some towns located close to those that were obliterated only suffered moderate damage. At Galatone, just 5 km away from Nardò, little damage occurred and the town only experienced an intensity of VI–VII. Not far from Salento is Copertino, where the intensity was VII, causing little damage.

Damage was reported in other parts of Italy, including Naples, Matera, Reggio Calabria, and Messina. It was felt as far north as Udine and Trento. Across the strait, seven residents on the islands of Lefkada and Corfu were killed by collapsed homes. Damage was described as "significant" on Lefkada, which was assigned an intensity of IX. Reports of damage also came from Preveza, Albania and Malta. Intensity VII on the European macroseismic scale was felt across the Maltese Islands. The earthquake severely damaged many churches and cathedrals, including the St Paul's Cathedral in Mdina.

== Tsunami ==
Based on the study of boulders along the southern coast of the Strait of Otranto, it was determined that the tsunami had a run-up of 11 meters. The tsunami transported large boulders as heavy as 70 tons several meters inland. Despite the large run-ups, little documentation of the tsunami exists as the area was unpopulated. At Brindisi, the tsunami only measured 1.5 meters. The Apulia region was also struck by tsunamis associated with the earthquakes of December 1456 to January 1457.

== See also ==
- List of earthquakes in Italy
- List of earthquakes in Greece
- List of earthquakes in Albania
- List of historical earthquakes
- List of tsunamis
