= 2019 Shijak earthquake =

Earthquake in central Albania

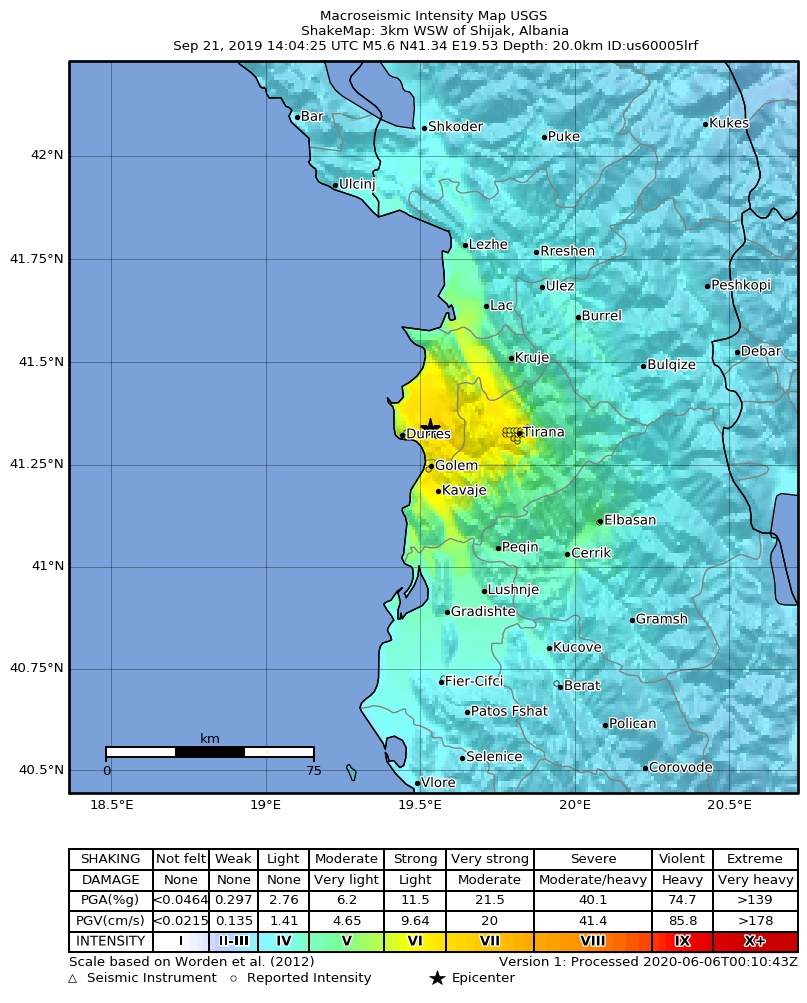
- UTC time: 2019-09-21 14:04:25
- USGS-ANSS: ComCat
- Local date: 21 September 2019
- Local time: 16:04:25
- Magnitude: 5.6 M_{w}
- Depth: 20 km (12 mi)
- Epicenter: 41.338°N 19.530°E
- Areas affected: Albania
- Max. intensity: MMI VII (Very strong)
- Casualties: 108 injured 563 homes and 28 buildings damaged

The 2019 Shijak earthquake was a 5.6 magnitude earthquake that rocked the central part of Albania on 21 September 2019 at 16:04 local time. The earthquake caused significant damage across central Albania, particularly in Durrës County, injuring 108 people and damaging 563 homes and 28 buildings. It was followed by multiple aftershocks, with the largest measuring 4.2 Mw, which prolonged public anxiety in the affected regions. Though less severe than the November 2019 Albania earthquake that struck two months later, this seismic event highlighted vulnerabilities in the region's building infrastructure and prompted reviews of seismic safety protocols. The earthquake originated from movement along the Shijak Fault in the Adriatic coastal seismogenic zone, a complex area where the Adriatic microplate collides with the Eurasian plate.

== Impact ==
On 21 September 2019 at 16:04 local time (UTC+02:00), a moment magnitude 5.6 earthquake struck beneath the Adriatic coast, with its epicentre located just south of Shijak in western Albania. The shock originated at a shallow focal depth of roughly 11 km and produced strong shaking (maximum intensity VII on the Mercalli scale) across Durrës County and neighbouring districts. Dozens of aftershocks followed, the largest measuring Mw 4.2, prolonging panic in affected communities. Structural damage was widespread: masonry buildings and older reinforced concrete blocks suffered partial or total collapse in Shijak, Durrës and surrounding villages. Official reports record 51 fatalities and over 600 injuries, while more than 2,000 residents were left homeless and required temporary shelter. In the aftermath, national and international emergency teams conducted search and rescue operations and the event prompted a review of Albania's seismic hazard models and accelerated enforcement of earthquake-resistant building codes.

== Tectonic setting ==
Albania lies on the southern convergent margin of the Eurasian Plate, where the Adriatic microplate collides with the Albanides orogen to form a complex fold–thrust belt known as the Adriatic coastal seismogenic zone. In north-western Albania this zone is underlain by several active thrust faults, particularly the east-dipping Shijak Fault (to the east of Shijak) and the west-dipping Vore Fault. Geodetic slip modelling of the Mw 6.4 Durres earthquake (26 November 2019) using Sentinel-1 InSAR data shows that the Shijak Fault dips at 30°–44° to the east, rupturing in a narrow patch between 3.5 km and 14 km depth, with a peak slip of ~0.89 m at ~10.4 km depth (geodetic moment 3.70 × 10^18 Nm, equivalent to Mw 6.31). The inversion and 2.5-D surface-displacement analysis confirm predominantly dip-slip motion with westward horizontal and uplift components, demonstrating the Shijak Fault's capacity for moderate to large earthquakes.

== See also ==
- 2019 Albania earthquake, a much stronger earthquake that happened 2 months later
- List of earthquakes in Albania
