= 1343 Naples tsunami =

1343 tsunami affecting the southwestern coast of Italy

1343 earthquake
- Location within Italy
- Local date: 25 November 1343
- Epicenter: Tyrrhenian Sea; 40°44′7″N 14°16′31″E
- Tsunami: Yes
- Casualties: Yes

The 1343 tsunami struck the Tyrrhenian Sea and Bay of Naples on 25 November 1343. Underground shocks were felt in Naples and caused significant damage and loss of lives. Of major note was a tsunami created by the earthquake which destroyed many ships in Naples and destroyed many ports along the Amalfi Coast including Amalfi itself. The effects of the tsunami were observed by the poet Petrarch, whose ship was forced to return to port, and recorded in the fifth book of his Epistolae familiares. A 2019 study attributes the event to a massive submarine landslide (possibly greater than 1 km^{3}), caused by flank collapse of the Stromboli volcano.

== See also ==
- List of earthquakes in Italy
- List of historical earthquakes
- List of tsunamis in Europe
