= Montecilfone =

Montecilfone Munxhufuni
- Comune
- Comune di Montecilfone
- Location within Italy Location within Molise
- Coordinates: 41°54′N 14°50′E
- Country: Italy
- Region: Molise
- Province: Campobasso (CB)

Government
  - Mayor: Franco Pallotta

Area
  - Total: 22.92 km^{2} (8.85 sq mi)
- Elevation: 405 m (1,329 ft)

Population (30 November 2017)
  - Total: 1,366
  - Density: 59.60/km^{2} (154.4/sq mi)
- Demonym: Montecilfonesi
- Time zone: UTC+1 (CET)
  - Summer (DST): UTC+2 (CEST)
- Postal code: 86032
- Dialing code: 0875
- Website: Official website

Montecilfone (Arbërisht: Munxhufuni) is an Arbëreshë comune of the Province of Campobasso in the Italian region of Molise, about 40 kilometres (25 mi) northeast of Campobasso. It borders Guglionesi, Montenero di Bisaccia and Palata.
