= Lago di Santa Croce =

Reservoir in Veneto, Italy

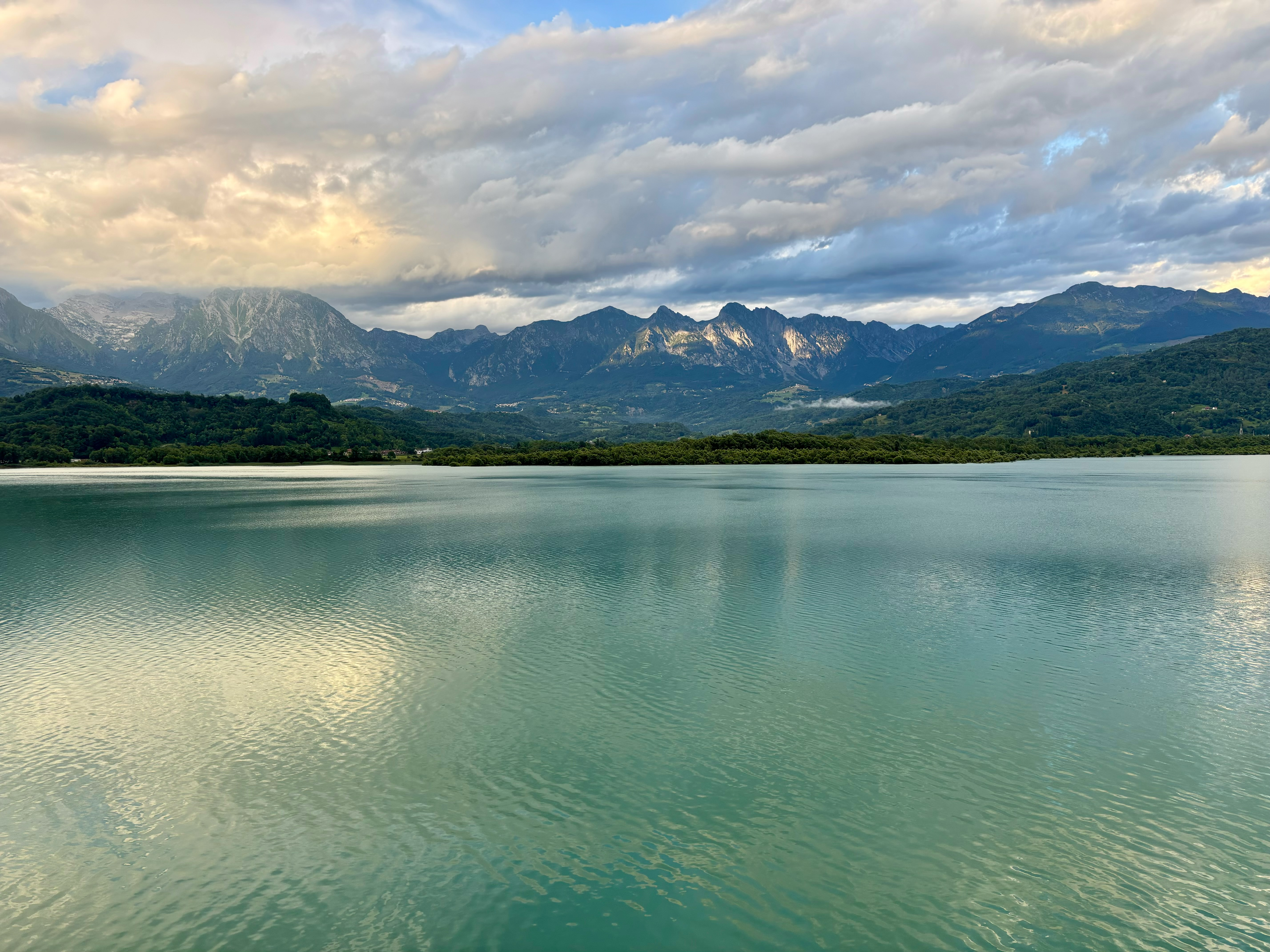

- Location within Italy
- Location: province of Belluno, Veneto, Italy
- Coordinates: 46°06′21″N 12°20′09″E
- Surface area: 7.2 square kilometres (2.8 sq mi)
- Average depth: 33 metres (108 feet)
- Surface elevation: 386 metres (1,266 feet)

The Lago di Santa Croce is a semi-natural lake in the province of Belluno, Veneto, northern Italy. It is part of the communes of Alpago and Ponte nelle Alpi.

The lake is located at 386 metres (1,266 feet) ASL and currently has an area of 7.2 square kilometres (2.8 sq mi), with an average depth of 33 metres (108 feet).

It was originally naturally a smaller lake, but was expanded with a dam during the 1930s.

Outlets of the lake include the Piave.

The area is quite a windy location and as such is a popular sailing, watersports and kitesurfing location.
