= 1627 Gargano earthquake =

Large earthquake in eastern Italy

- Location within Italy
- Local date: July 30, 1627
- Local time: 10:50
- Magnitude: 6.7 M_{w}
- Epicenter: 41.74°N 15.34°E
- Fault: Apricena Fault
- Total damage: Severe
- Max. intensity: MMI X (Extreme)
- Tsunami: Yes
- Casualties: 5,000 dead

The 1627 Gargano earthquake struck Gargano and part of Tavoliere, southern Italy, at about mid-day on 30 July 1627. A "very large earthquake" caused a major tsunami, the largest seismic event ever recorded in the Gargano region, which "produced severe damage in the whole promontory", killing about 5,000 people. Four aftershocks were documented. The most extensive damage was noted between San Severo and Lesina.

Some sources describe a large 1626 Naples earthquake, but other have argued that these are misreports of the 1627 event.
