= Girifalco =

- Comune
- Comune di Girifalco
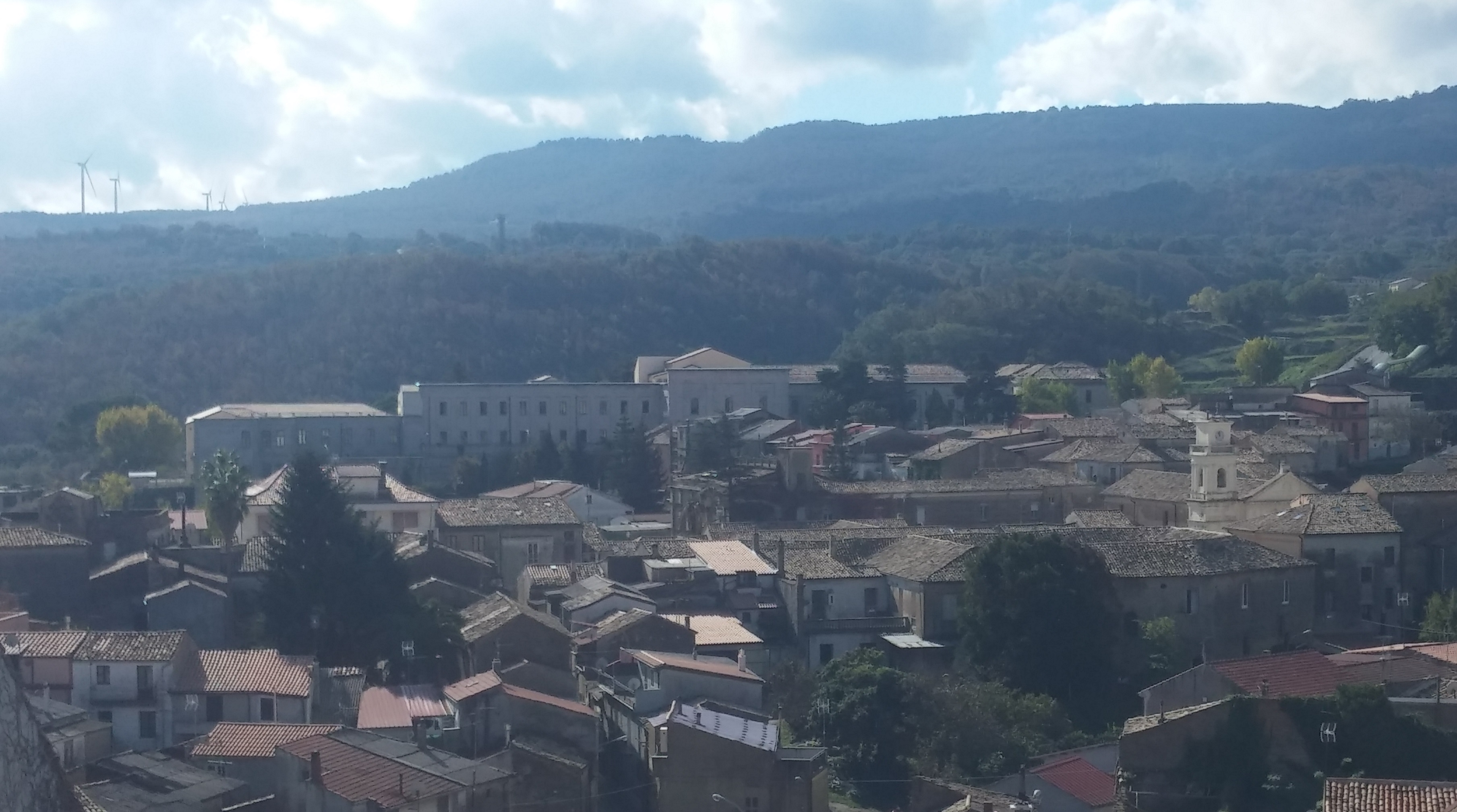

- Location within Italy Location within Calabria
- Coordinates: 38°49′25″N 16°26′25″E
- Country: Italy
- Region: Calabria
- Province: Catanzaro (CZ)

Government
  - Mayor: Pietrantonio Cristofaro

Area
  - Total: 43.1 km^{2} (16.6 sq mi)
- Elevation: 456 m (1,496 ft)

Population (31 December 2013)
  - Total: 5,945
  - Density: 138/km^{2} (357/sq mi)
- Demonym: Girifalcesi
- Time zone: UTC+1 (CET)
  - Summer (DST): UTC+2 (CEST)
- Postal code: 88024
- Dialing code: 0968
- Patron saint: St. Roch
- Saint day: 16 August
- Website: Official website

Girifalco is a comune and town in the province of Catanzaro in the Calabria region of southern Italy.

== History ==
The first settlements in the area date back to prehistoric times, as evidenced by the archaeological finds discovered in the area and datable to the Neolithic age. It was founded by the inhabitants of Caria and Toco, who, in order to escape the devastating Saracen raids, decided to move to the heights. Possession, at the beginning of the 14th century, of Caterina Niceforo, daughter of the despot of Epirus, then made part of the county of Arena, in which it remained until the end of the fifteenth century. Among the noble families, who obtained their investiture, there were the Borgia of Squillace, the Carafa of Soriano, the Ravaschieri and the Caracciolo. These last two families gave birth to the Duchy of Girifalco which lasted from 1624 to 1806. The toponym has an uncertain etymology. Some scholars refer to the homonymous Italian term, indicating ‘a species of falcon (from the ancient northern word “geirfalk”), others make it derive from the Greek “kur Falkos”. A minute of 1845 records a lodge called Fidelitas being founded at Girifalco in Calabria in 1723. In spite of the lack of earlier records, this is often cited as the first Masonic Lodge in Italy.
