= Alpago =

- Comune
- Comune di Alpago
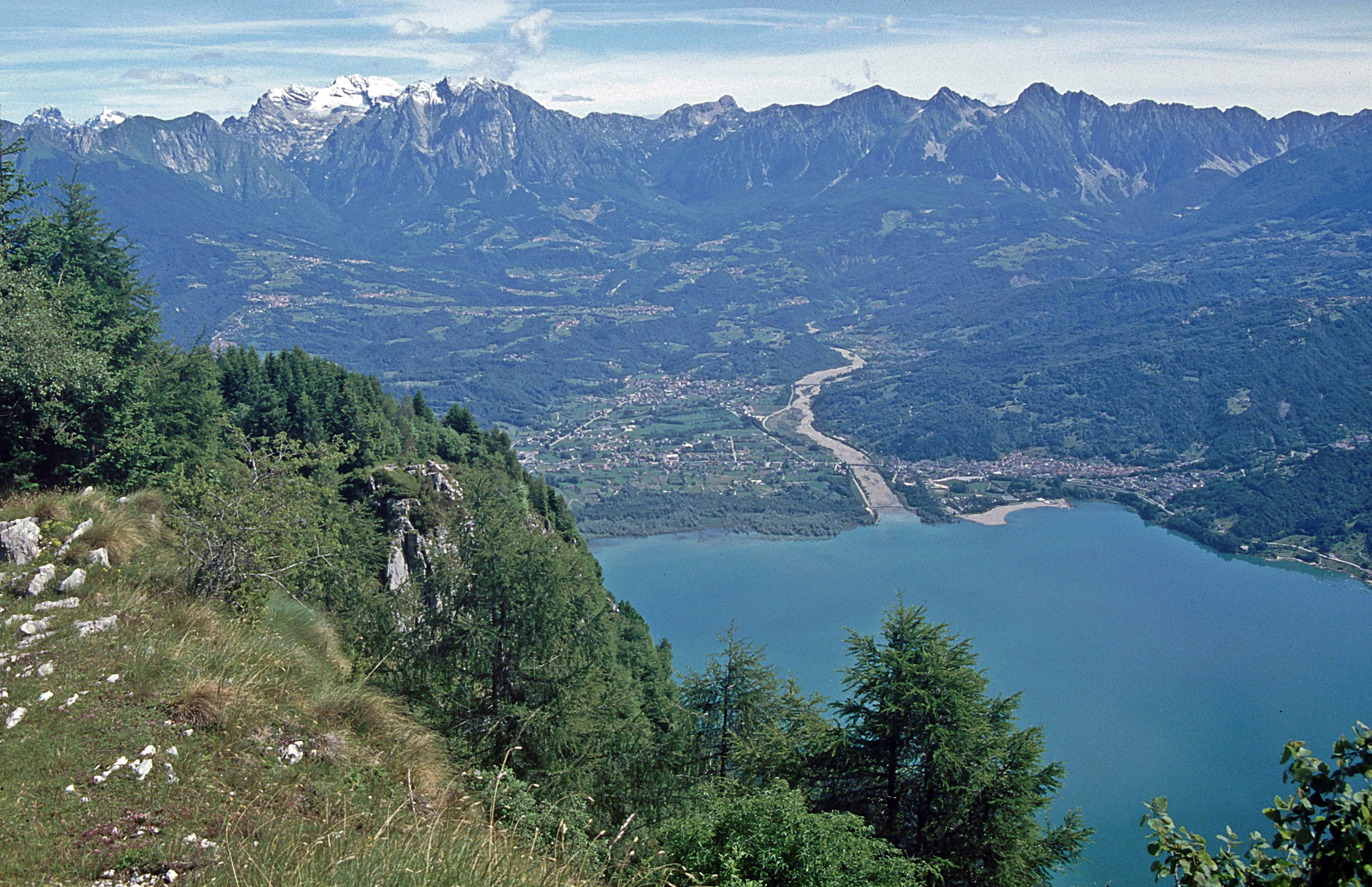
- The town and the Lago di Santa Croce.

- Location of Alpago in Italy Alpago (Veneto)
- Coordinates: 46°7′34″N 12°21′9″E
- Country: Italy
- Region: Veneto
- Province: Belluno (BL)
- Frazioni: Bastia, Buscole, Campon, Cornei, Curago, Farra d'Alpago, Foran, Garna, Lastra, Paludi, Pian Cansiglio, Pian Osteria, Pianture, Pieve d'Alpago (communal seat), Plois, Poiatte, Puos d'Alpago, Quers, Santa Croce del Lago, Schiucaz, Sitran, Sommacosta, Spert, Tignes, Tomas, Torch, Torres, Valzella, Villa, Villaggio Riviera, Villanova

Government
  - Mayor: Alberto Peterle

Area
  - Total: 80.34 km^{2} (31.02 sq mi)
- Elevation: 690 m (2,260 ft)

Population (31 July 2017)
  - Total: 6,858
  - Density: 85.36/km^{2} (221.1/sq mi)
- Demonym: Alpagoti
- Time zone: UTC+1 (CET)
  - Summer (DST): UTC+2 (CEST)
- Postal code: 32010, 32015, 32016
- Dialing code: 0437
- Website: Official website

Alpago is a comune (municipality) in the Province of Belluno in the Italian region of Veneto. It is located about 80 kilometres (50 mi) north of Venice and about 12 kilometres (7 mi) east of Belluno. Lago di Santa Croce is located near Alpago.

It was established on 23 February 2016 by the merger of the municipalities of Farra d'Alpago, Pieve d'Alpago and Puos d'Alpago.

== Twin towns ==
- Kalvarija, Lithuania
