= List of earthquakes in the United States =

The following is a list of notable earthquakes and tsunamis which had their epicenter in areas that are now part of the United States with the latter affecting areas of the United States. Those in italics were not part of the United States when the event occurred.

== List of earthquakes ==
Date	State(s)	Magnitude	Fatalities	Article	Further information
June 11, 1585	Aleutian Islands, Alaska	9.2 M_{w}	Unknown	1585 Aleutian Islands earthquake	
January 26, 1700	Washington, Oregon, California	8.7–9.2 M_{w}	Unknown	1700 Cascadia earthquake	
November 18, 1755	Massachusetts	5.9 M_{w}	0	1755 Cape Ann earthquake	
July 21, 1788	Alaska	8.0 M_{s}	Unknown		
August 6, 1788	Alaska	8.0 M_{s}	Unknown		
December 16, 1811	Missouri	7.5–8.0 M_{w}	100−500	1811–1812 New Madrid earthquakes	
December 8, 1812	California	6.9 M_{la}, 7.5 M_{w}	40+	1812 San Juan Capistrano earthquake	
December 12, 1812	California	7.1–7.5 M_{w}	1	1812 Ventura earthquake	
June 2, 1823	Hawaii	7.0 M_{L}	0		
June 1838	California	6.8–7.2 M_{w}	0	1838 San Andreas earthquake	
January 5, 1843	Arkansas	6.3 M_{w}	0		
January 9, 1857	California	7.9 M_{w}	2	1857 Fort Tejon earthquake	
April 24, 1867	Kansas	5.1 M_{fa}	0	1867 Manhattan, Kansas earthquake	
April 2, 1868	Hawaii	7.9 M_{fa}	77	1868 Hawaii earthquake	
October 21, 1868	California	6.3–6.7 M_{L}	30	1868 Hayward earthquake	
February 20, 1871	Hawaii	6.8 M_{L}	0	1871 Lānaʻi earthquake	
March 26, 1872	California	7.4–7.9 M_{w}	27	1872 Owens Valley earthquake	
December 14, 1872	Washington	6.5–7.0 M_{w}	0	1872 North Cascades earthquake	
November 23, 1873	California-Oregon	7.3 M_{L}	0	1873 Oregon-California earthquake	
October 26, 1880	Alaska	7.0 M_{s}	0		
November 8, 1882	Colorado	6.6 M_{w}	0	1882 Fort Collins earthquake	
August 10, 1884	New York	4.9–5.5 M_{fa}	3		
August 31, 1886	South Carolina	6.9–7.3 M_{w}	60	1886 Charleston earthquake	
April 19, 1892	California	6.4 M_{L}	1	1892 Vacaville–Winters earthquakes	
April 21, 1892	California	6.4 M_{L}	0	1892 Vacaville–Winters earthquakes	
October 31, 1895	Missouri	6.6 M_{L}	0	1895 Charleston earthquake	
September 4, 1899	Alaska	8.2 M_{s}	0	1899 Yakutat Bay earthquakes	
September 10, 1899	Alaska	8.2 M_{w}	0	1899 Yakutat Bay earthquakes	
December 25, 1899	California	6.4 M_{s}	6	1899 San Jacinto earthquake	
October 9, 1900	Alaska	7.9 M_{w}	0		
November 14, 1901	Utah	7.0 M_{w}	0	1901 Richfield earthquake	
December 31, 1901	Alaska	7.8 M_{s}	0		
January 1, 1902	Alaska	7.8 M	0		
August 27, 1904	Alaska	7.3 M_{s}	0		
April 18, 1906	California	7.9 M_{w}	3,000+	1906 San Francisco earthquake	
August 17, 1906	Alaska	8.4 M_{w}	0	1906 Aleutian Islands earthquake	
September 27, 1909	Indiana	5.1 M_{fa}	0	1909 Wabash River earthquake	
June 23, 1915	California	6.2 M	6	1915 Imperial Valley earthquakes	
October 3, 1915	Nevada	6.8 M_{w}	0	1915 Pleasant Valley earthquake	
April 21, 1918	California	6.8 M	0	1918 San Jacinto earthquake	
September 29, 1921	Utah	6.3 M_{w}	0	1921 Sevier Valley earthquake	
January 31, 1922	California	7.6 M_{GR}	0		
January 22, 1923	California	7.2 M_{GR}	0		
June 28, 1925	Montana	6.6 M_{w}	0	1925 Montana earthquake	
June 29, 1925	California	6.5–6.8 M_{w}	13	1925 Santa Barbara earthquake	
October 24, 1927	Alaska	7.3 M_{w}	0		
November 4, 1927	California	7.3 M_{w}	0	1927 Lompoc earthquake	
March 7, 1929	Alaska	7.8 M_{w}	0		
August 16, 1931	Texas	6.5 M_{w}	0	1931 Valentine earthquake	
December 21, 1932	Nevada	7.2 M_{w}	0	1932 Cedar Mountain earthquake	
March 10, 1933	California	6.4 M_{w}	120	1933 Long Beach earthquake	
December 31, 1934	California	7.1 M	0		
March 12, 1934	Utah	6.6 M_{w}	2	1934 Hansel Valley earthquake	
October 18, 1935	Montana	6.2 M_{s}	4	1935 Helena earthquake	
July 15, 1936	Oregon, Washington	5.8 M_{L}	0	1936 State Line earthquake	
July 22, 1937	Alaska	7.3 M_{s}	0	1937 Alaska earthquake	
November 10, 1938	Alaska	8.2 M_{w}	0		
May 18, 1940	California	6.9 M_{w}	9	1940 El Centro earthquake	
December 20, 1940	New Hampshire	5.3 M_{w}	0	1940 New Hampshire earthquakes	
December 24, 1940	New Hampshire	5.5 M_{w}	0	1940 New Hampshire earthquakes	
November 3, 1943	Alaska	7.6 M_{w}	0		
September 5, 1944	New York	5.8 M_{w}	0	1944 Cornwall–Massena earthquake	
April 1, 1946	Alaska	8.6 M_{w}	165	1946 Aleutian Islands earthquake	
October 16, 1947	Alaska	7.2 M_{w}	0		
December 4, 1948	California	6.4 M_{w}	0	1948 Desert Hot Springs earthquake	
April 13, 1949	Washington	6.7 M_{w}	8	1949 Olympia earthquake	
July 21, 1952	California	7.3 M_{w}	14	1952 Kern County earthquake	
July 6, 1954	Nevada	6.6 M_{w}	0	1954 Rainbow Mountain earthquake	
August 24, 1954	Nevada	6.8 M_{w}	0	1954 Stillwater earthquake	
December 16, 1954	Nevada	7.1 M_{w}	0	1954 Fairview Peak earthquake	
December 16, 1954	Nevada	6.8 M_{w}	0	1954 Dixie Valley earthquake	
March 9, 1957	Alaska	8.6 M_{w}	0	1957 Andreanof Islands earthquake	
April 7, 1958	Alaska	7.3 M_{w}	0	1958 Huslia earthquake	
July 9, 1958	Alaska	7.8 M_{w}	5 (tsunami)	1958 Lituya Bay earthquake and megatsunami	
August 18, 1959	Montana, Wyoming, Idaho	7.2 M_{w}	28+	1959 Hebgen Lake earthquake	
March 27, 1964	Alaska	9.2 M_{w}	143	1964 Alaska earthquake	
February 4, 1965	Alaska	8.7 M_{w}	0	1965 Rat Islands earthquake	
April 29, 1965	Washington	6.7 M_{w}	7	1965 Puget Sound earthquake	
July 2, 1965	Alaska	7.8 M_{w}	0		
August 9, 1967	Colorado	5.3	0	Rocky Mountain Arsenal#Deep injection well	
November 26, 1967	Colorado	5.2	0	Rocky Mountain Arsenal#Deep injection well	
April 8, 1968	California	6.6 M_{w}	0	1968 Borrego Mountain earthquake	
November 9, 1968	Illinois	5.4 mb	0	1968 Illinois earthquake	
October 2, 1969	California	5.6, 5.7 M_{L}	1	1969 Santa Rosa earthquakes	Doublet
February 9, 1971	California	6.5–6.7 M_{w}	58–65	1971 San Fernando earthquake	
July 30, 1972	Alaska	7.6 M_{w}	0		
February 2, 1975	Alaska	7.6 M_{s}	0	1975 Near Islands earthquake	
November 29, 1975	Hawaii	7.7 M_{w}	2	1975 Hawaii earthquake	
November 8, 1980	California	7.2 M_{w}	5	1980 Eureka earthquake	
May 2, 1983	California	6.5 M_{w}	0	1983 Coalinga earthquake	
November 16, 1983	Hawaii	6.7 M_{w}	0	1983 Kaoiki earthquake	
October 28, 1983	Idaho	7.3 M_{w}	2	1983 Borah Peak earthquake	
April 24, 1984	California	6.2 M_{w}	0	1984 Morgan Hill earthquake	
January 31, 1986	Ohio	5.0 M_{w}	0	1986 Ohio earthquake	
May 7, 1986	Alaska	8.0 M_{w}	0		
July 8, 1986	California	6.0 M_{w}	0	1986 North Palm Springs earthquake	
July 21, 1986	California	6.4 M_{L}	0	1986 Chalfant Valley earthquake	
October 1, 1987	California	5.9 M_{w}	8	1987 Whittier Narrows earthquake	
November 23, 1987	California	6.2 M_{s}	0	1987 Superstition Hills earthquakes	
November 24, 1987	California	6.6 M_{w}	2	1987 Superstition Hills earthquakes	
November 30, 1987	Alaska	7.9 M_{w}	0		
March 6, 1988	Alaska	7.8 M_{w}	0		
October 17, 1989	California	6.9 M_{w}	63	1989 Loma Prieta earthquake	
September 4, 1989	Alaska	7.1 M_{w}	0		
May 30, 1991	Alaska	7.0 M_{w}	0		
June 28, 1991	California	5.6 M_{w}	2	1991 Sierra Madre earthquake	
August 17, 1991	Oregon	7.0 M_{h}	0		
April 23, 1992	California	6.3 M_{s}	0	1992 Joshua Tree earthquake	
April 25–26, 1992	California	6.5–7.2 M_{w}	0	1992 Cape Mendocino earthquakes	
June 28, 1992	California	7.3 M_{w}	3	1992 Landers earthquake	
June 28, 1992	California	6.5 M_{w}	0	1992 Big Bear earthquake	
September 2, 1992	Utah	5.8 M_{L}	0	1992 St. George earthquake	
March 25, 1993	Oregon	5.6 M_{d}	0	1993 Scotts Mills earthquake	
September 20, 1993	Oregon	6.0 M_{d}	2	1993 Klamath Falls earthquakes	
January 17, 1994	California	6.7 M_{w}	57	1994 Northridge earthquake	
September 1, 1994	California	7.0 M_{w}	0	1994 Northern California earthquake	
April 14, 1995	Texas	5.7 M_{w}	0	1995 Marathon earthquake	
June 10, 1996	Alaska	7.9 M_{wc}	0		
September 25, 1998	Pennsylvania	5.2 mb_{Lg}	0	1998 Pymatuning earthquake	
October 16, 1999	California	7.1 M_{w}	0	1999 Hector Mine earthquake	
December 6, 1999	Alaska	7.0 M_{w}	0		
January 10, 2001	Alaska	7.0 M_{w}	0		
February 28, 2001	Washington	6.8 M_{d}	1	2001 Nisqually earthquake	
November 3, 2002	Alaska	7.9 M_{w}	0	2002 Denali earthquake	
November 17, 2003	Alaska	7.8 M_{wc}	0	2003 Alaska earthquake	
December 22, 2003	California	6.5 M_{w}	2	2003 San Simeon earthquake	
June 15, 2005	California	7.2 M_{wc}	0		
September 10, 2006	Florida	5.9 M_{wc}	0	2006 Gulf of Mexico earthquake	
October 15, 2006	Hawaii	6.7 M_{d}	0	2006 Kiholo Bay earthquake	
October 30, 2007	California	5.5 M_{w}	0	2007 Alum Rock earthquake	
February 21, 2008	Nevada	5.9 M_{w}	0	2008 Wells earthquake	
April 18, 2008	Illinois	5.2 M_{w}	0	2008 Illinois earthquake	
July 29, 2008	California	5.4 M_{w}	0	2008 Chino Hills earthquake	
January 9, 2010	California	6.5 M_{w}	0	2010 Eureka earthquake	
April 4, 2010	California	7.2 M_{w}	0	2010 Baja California earthquake	
August 22, 2011	Colorado	5.3 M_{wr}	0	2011 Colorado earthquake	
August 23, 2011	Virginia	5.8 M_{w}	0	2011 Virginia earthquake	
November 5, 2011	Oklahoma	5.7 M_{ww}	0	2011 Oklahoma earthquake	
January 5, 2013	Alaska	7.5 M_{w}	0	2013 Craig, Alaska earthquake	
March 10, 2014	California	6.9 M_{w}	0	2014 Cape Mendocino earthquake	
March 29, 2014	California	5.1 M_{w}	0	2014 La Habra earthquake	
June 23, 2014	Alaska	7.9 M_{ww}	0	2014 Aleutian Islands earthquake	
July 25, 2014	Alaska	6.0 M_{w}	0	2014 Palma Bay earthquake	
August 24, 2014	California	6.0 M_{w}	1	2014 South Napa earthquake	
January 24, 2016	Alaska	7.1 M_{w}	0	2016 Old Iliamna earthquake	
September 3, 2016	Oklahoma	5.8 M_{ww}	0	2016 Oklahoma earthquake	
January 23, 2018	Alaska	7.9 M_{ww}	0	2018 Gulf of Alaska earthquake	
May 4, 2018	Hawaii	6.9 M_{ww}	0	2018 Hawaii earthquake	
November 30, 2018	Alaska	7.1 M_{ww}	0	2018 Anchorage earthquake	
July 4, 2019	California	6.4 M_{w}	1	2019 Ridgecrest earthquakes	
July 5, 2019	California	7.1 M_{w}	0	2019 Ridgecrest earthquakes	
March 18, 2020	Utah	5.7 M_{w}	0	2020 Salt Lake City earthquake	
March 31, 2020	Idaho	6.5 M_{ww}	0	2020 Central Idaho earthquake	
May 15, 2020	Nevada	6.5 M_{L}	0	2020 Monte Cristo Range earthquake	
July 22, 2020	Alaska	7.8 M_{w}	0	2020 Alaska Peninsula earthquake	
August 9, 2020	North Carolina	5.1 M_{w}	0	2020 Sparta earthquake	
October 19, 2020	Alaska	7.6 M_{ww}	0	2021 Chignik earthquake § October 2020	
July 29, 2021	Alaska	8.2 M_{w}	0	2021 Chignik earthquake	
December 20, 2022	California	6.4 M_{w}	2	2022 Ferndale earthquake	
April 5, 2024	New Jersey	4.8 M_{w}	0	2024 New Jersey earthquake	
December 5, 2024	California	7.0 M_{w}	0	2024 Cape Mendocino earthquake	

Two-percent probability of exceedance in 50 years map of peak ground acceleration from the United States Geological Survey, released July 17, 2014

Earthquake swarms which affected the United States:

- 1962–71 Denver earthquake swarm
- Enola earthquake swarm
- 2008 Reno earthquakes
- Guy-Greenbrier earthquake swarm
- Oklahoma earthquake swarms (2009–present)

Earthquakes which affected the United States but whose epicenters were outside the United States borders:

- 1925 Charlevoix–Kamouraska earthquake – magnitude 6.2 earthquake, no injuries or fatalities anywhere
- 1979 Imperial Valley earthquake – magnitude 6.4 earthquake with an epicenter less than 1 km inside Mexico – significant damage and injuries on both sides of the border (60 in the US)
- 2010 Baja California earthquake (Mexico near S California) – magnitude 7.2 earthquake, 4 fatalities and 100 injuries, none in the United States

Earthquakes which did not affect the United States directly, but caused tsunamis which did:

- 1960 Valdivia earthquake and tsunami – magnitude 9.5 earthquake, between 2200 and 6000 fatalities, including 61 in Hilo, HI
- 2006 Kuril Islands earthquake and tsunami – magnitude 8.3 earthquake, no injuries or fatalities anywhere
- 2009 Samoa earthquake and tsunami – magnitude 8.0 earthquake with an epicenter 120 miles (190 km) southwest of American Samoa generated tsunami waves up to 16 feet (5 m), killing 34 people in American Samoa and causing extensive damage
- 2010 Chile earthquake and tsunami – magnitude 8.8 earthquake, ~525 fatalities and unknown number of injuries, none in the United States
- 2011 Tohoku earthquake and tsunami – magnitude 9.0 earthquake, 15,850–28,000 fatalities and 6,011 injured, one fatality and unknown number of injuries in the United States
- 2012 Haida Gwaii earthquake – magnitude 7.8 earthquake with an epicenter on Moresby Island in British Columbia, the second-largest Canadian earthquake ever recorded by a seismometer. Over 100,000 people were evacuated to higher ground in the state of Hawai'i.

== List of strongest earthquakes by states and territories ==
Noted, magnitudes are reported on the moment magnitude scale (M_{w}) unless otherwise indicated.

State	Magnitude	Date	Further information
Alabama	5.1 M_{L}	October 18, 1916	1916 Irondale earthquake
Alaska	9.2	March 27, 1964	1964 Alaska earthquake
American Samoa	8.3–8.5	June 26, 1917	1917 Samoa earthquake
Arizona	7.6	May 3, 1887	1887 Sonora earthquake
Arkansas	7.6–7.9	December 16, 1811	1811–1812 New Madrid earthquakes
California	7.9	January 9, 1857; April 16, 1906	1857 Fort Tejon earthquake, 1906 San Francisco earthquake
Colorado	6.6	November 8, 1882	1882 Fort Collins earthquake
Connecticut	4.4–5.0 M_{s}	May 16, 1791	
Delaware	4.1 M_{L}	November 30, 2017	
District of Columbia	5.8	August 23, 2011	2011 Virginia earthquake
Florida	4.4	January 12, 1879	
Georgia (U.S. state)	4.5	March 5, 1914	
Guam	8.1	September 22, 1902	
Hawaii	7.9	April 2, 1868	1868 Hawaii earthquake
Idaho	6.9	October 28, 1983	1983 Borah Peak earthquake
Illinois	5.3	November 9, 1968	1968 Illinois earthquake
Indiana	5.1	September 27, 1909	1909 Wabash River earthquake
Iowa	5.0–5.1	November 12, 1934	
Kansas	5.1	April 24, 1867	1867 Manhattan, Kansas earthquake
Kentucky	7.6–7.9	December 16, 1811	1811–1812 New Madrid earthquakes
Louisiana	4.9	March 5, 2026	
Maine	5.9	March 21, 1904	
Maryland	5.8	August 23, 2011	2011 Virginia earthquake
Massachusetts	5.9	November 18, 1755	1755 Cape Ann earthquake
Michigan	4.6 M_{L}	August 10, 1947	
Minnesota	4.6 M_{L}	July 9, 1975	1975 Morris earthquake
Mississippi	7.6–7.9	December 16, 1811	1811–1812 New Madrid earthquakes
Missouri	7.6–7.9	December 16, 1811	1811–1812 New Madrid earthquakes
Montana	7.2	August 17, 1959	1959 Hebgen Lake earthquake
Nebraska	5.6 M_{I}	November 15, 1877	
Nevada	7.3	December 16, 1954	1954 Fairview earthquake
New Hampshire	6.5	June 1, 1638	1638 New Hampshire earthquake
New Jersey	5.3	November 29, 1783	1783 New Jersey earthquake
New Mexico	6.2	November 15, 1906	
New York	5.8	September 5, 1944	1944 Cornwall–Massena earthquake
North Carolina	5.2	February 21, 1916	
North Dakota	4.4	July 8, 1968	
Ohio	5.4	March 9, 1937	
Oklahoma	5.8	September 3, 2016	2016 Oklahoma earthquake
Oregon	8.7–9.2	January 26, 1700	1700 Cascadia earthquake
Pennsylvania	5.2	September 25, 1998	1998 Pymatuning earthquake
Puerto Rico	8.0–8.3	May 2, 1787	1787 Boricua earthquake
Rhode Island	4.7	June 10, 1951	
South Carolina	6.9–7.3	August 31, 1886	1886 Charleston earthquake
South Dakota	4.5	June 2, 1911	
Tennessee	7.6–7.9	December 16, 1811	1811–1812 New Madrid earthquakes
Texas	6.5	August 16, 1931	1931 Valentine earthquake
Utah	7.0	November 13, 1901	1901 Richfield earthquake
U.S. Virgin Islands	7.5	November 18, 1867	1867 Virgin Islands earthquake and tsunami
Vermont	4.0	March 31, 1953	
Virginia	5.8; 5.8–5.9	August 23, 2011; May 31, 1897	2011 Virginia earthquake 1897 Giles County earthquake
Washington (state)	8.7–9.2	January 26, 1700	1700 Cascadia earthquake
West Virginia	5.8	August 23, 2011	2011 Virginia earthquake
Wisconsin	4.2	May 6, 1947	1947 Wisconsin earthquake
Wyoming	7.2	August 17, 1959	1959 Hebgen Lake earthquake

== Gallery ==
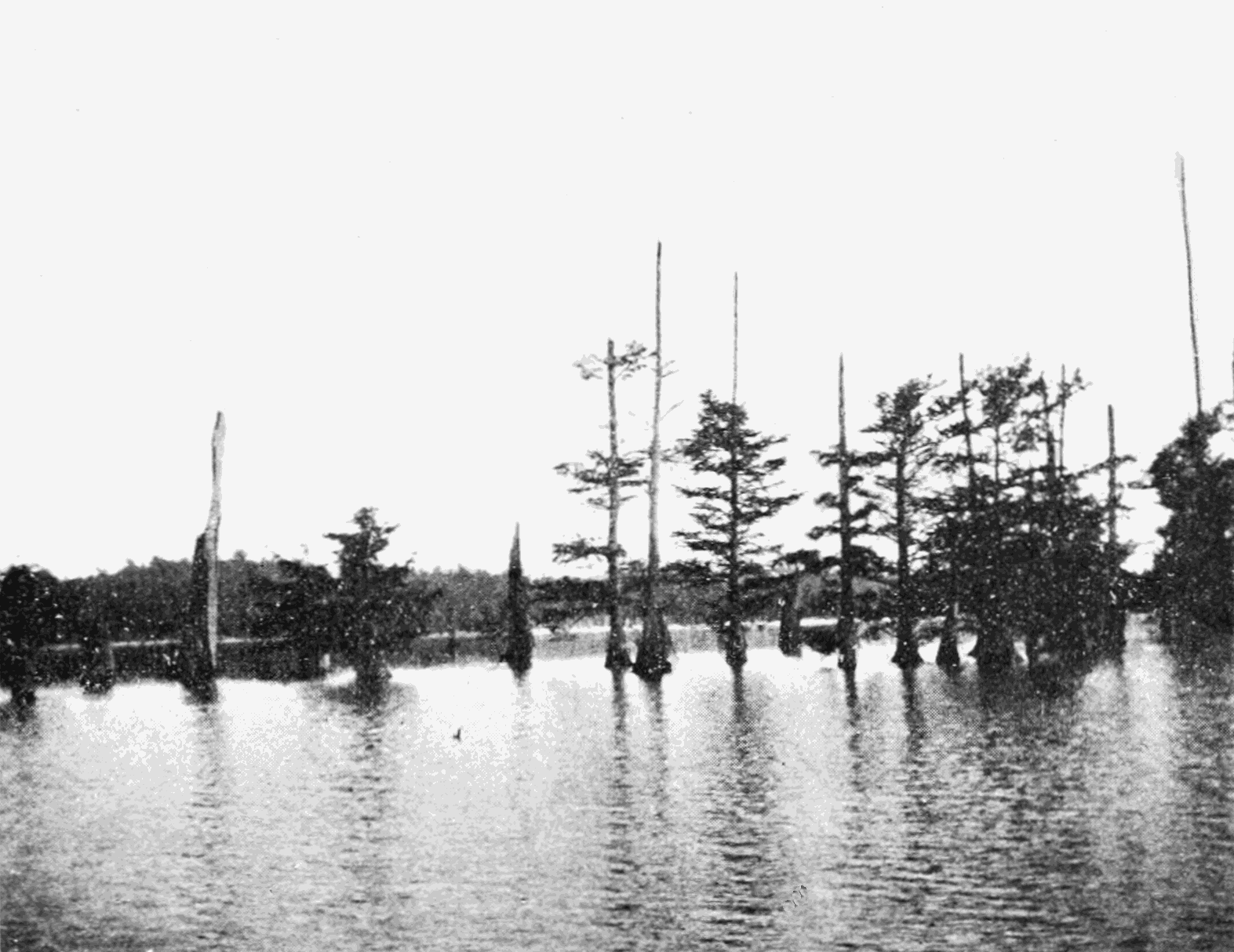
1811–1812 New Madrid earthquakes

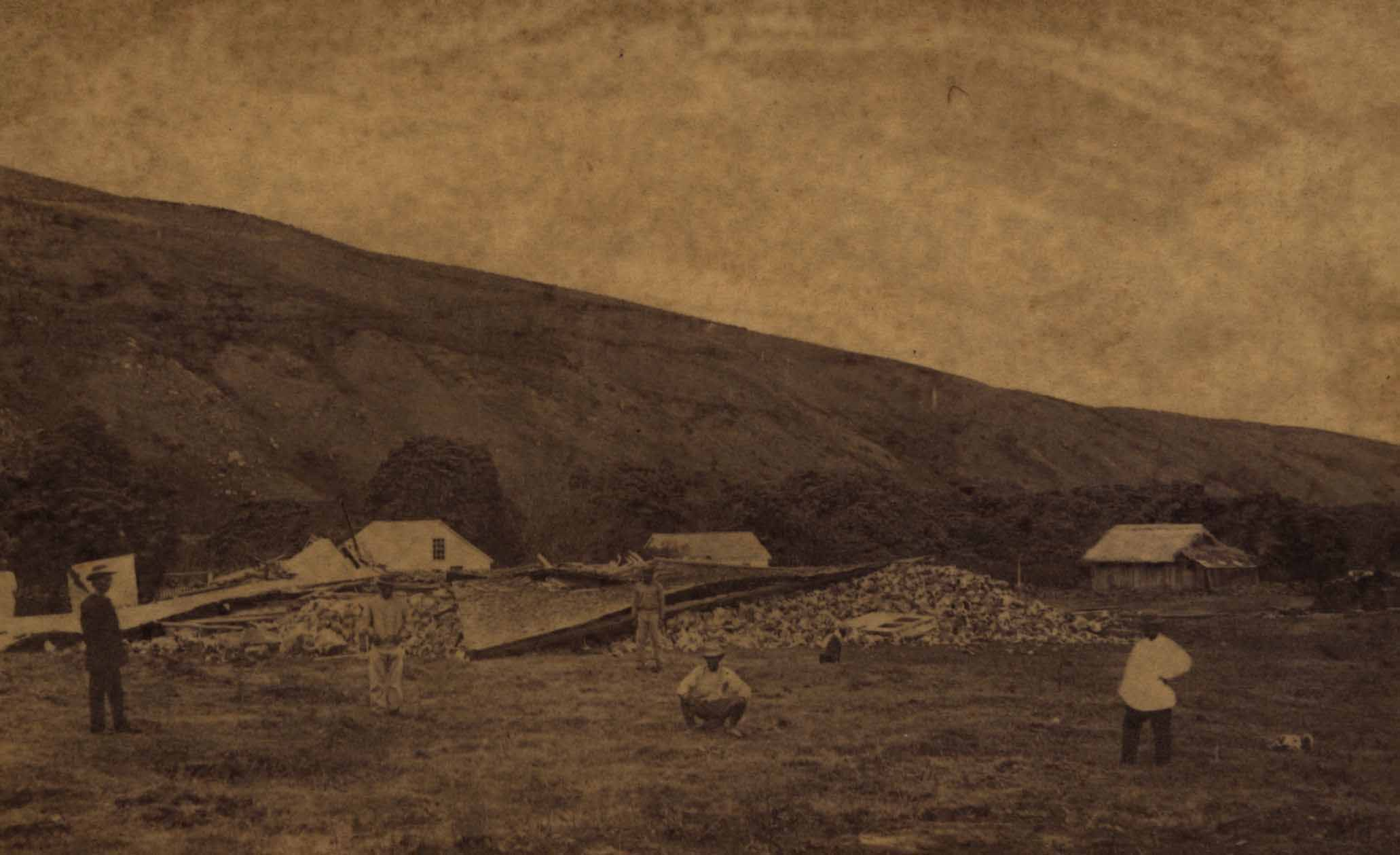
1868 Hawaii earthquake

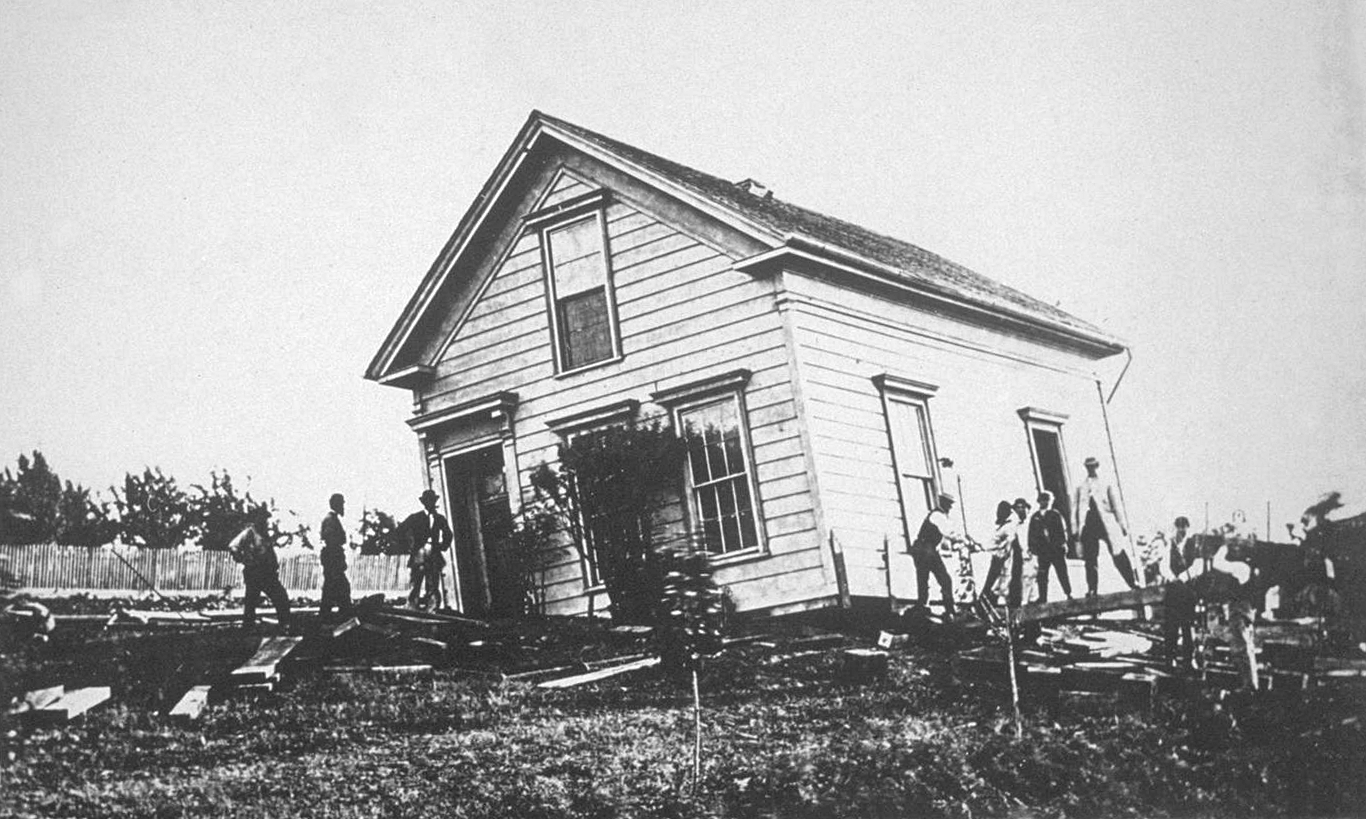
1868 Hayward earthquake

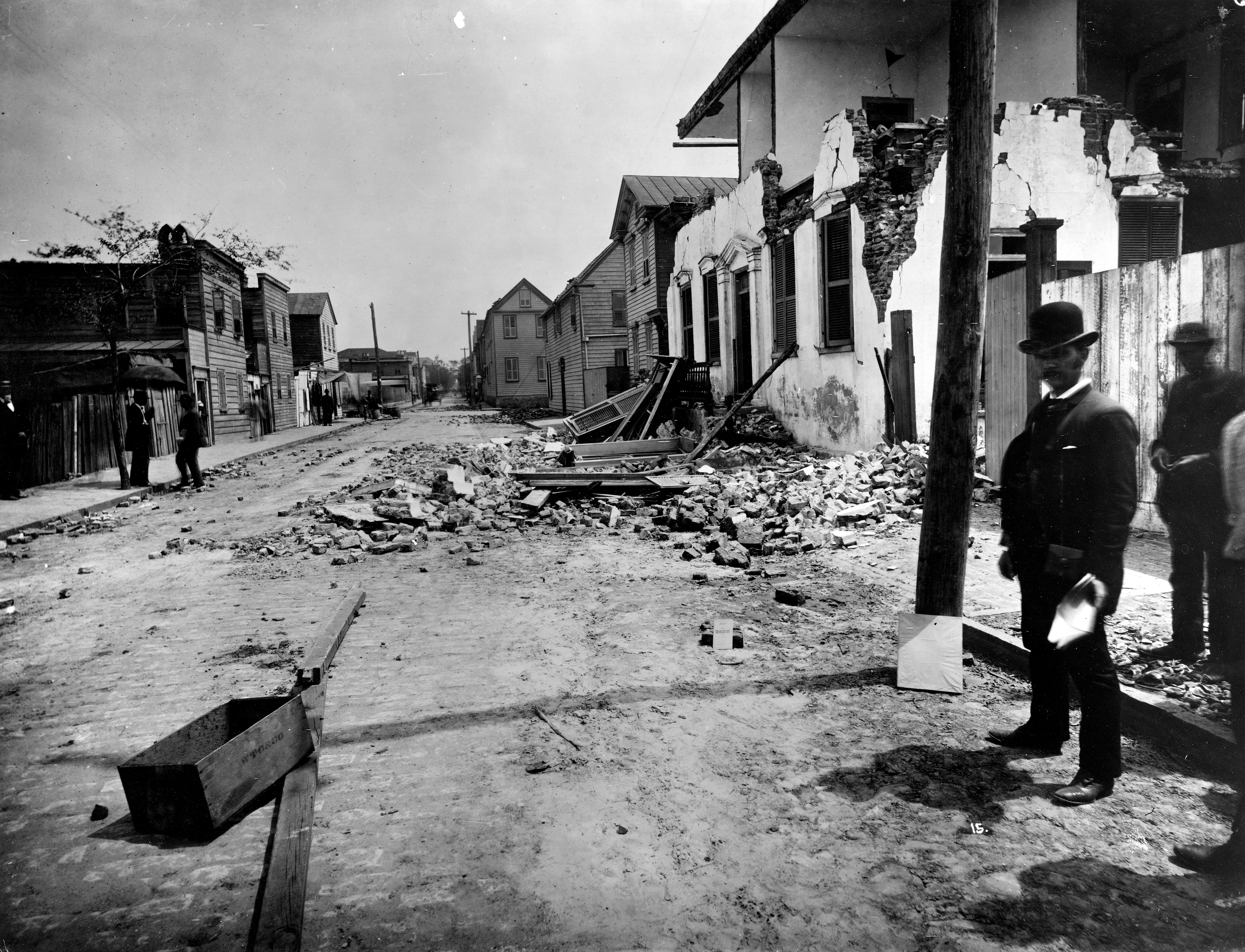
1886 Charleston earthquake

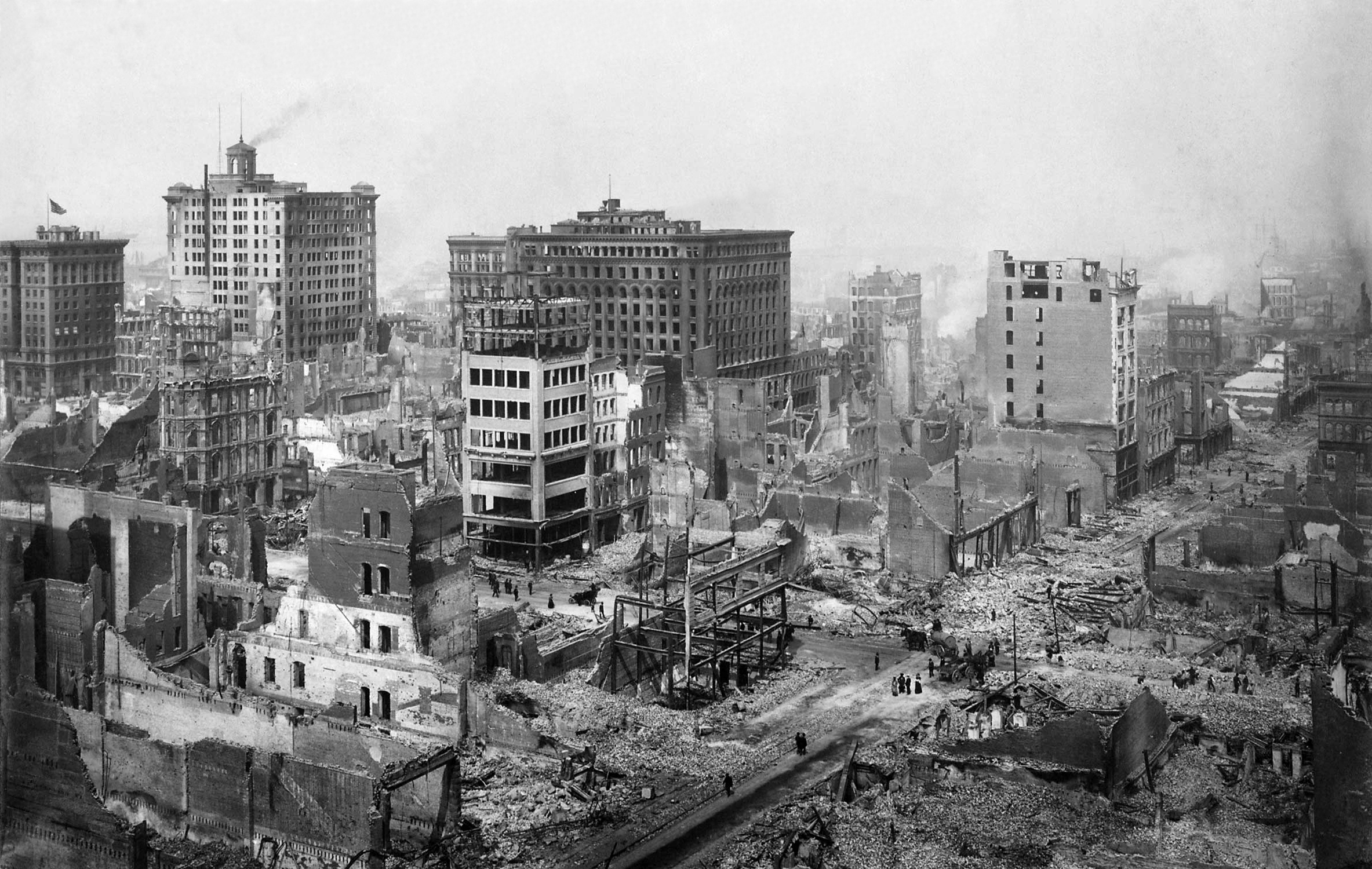
1906 San Francisco earthquake

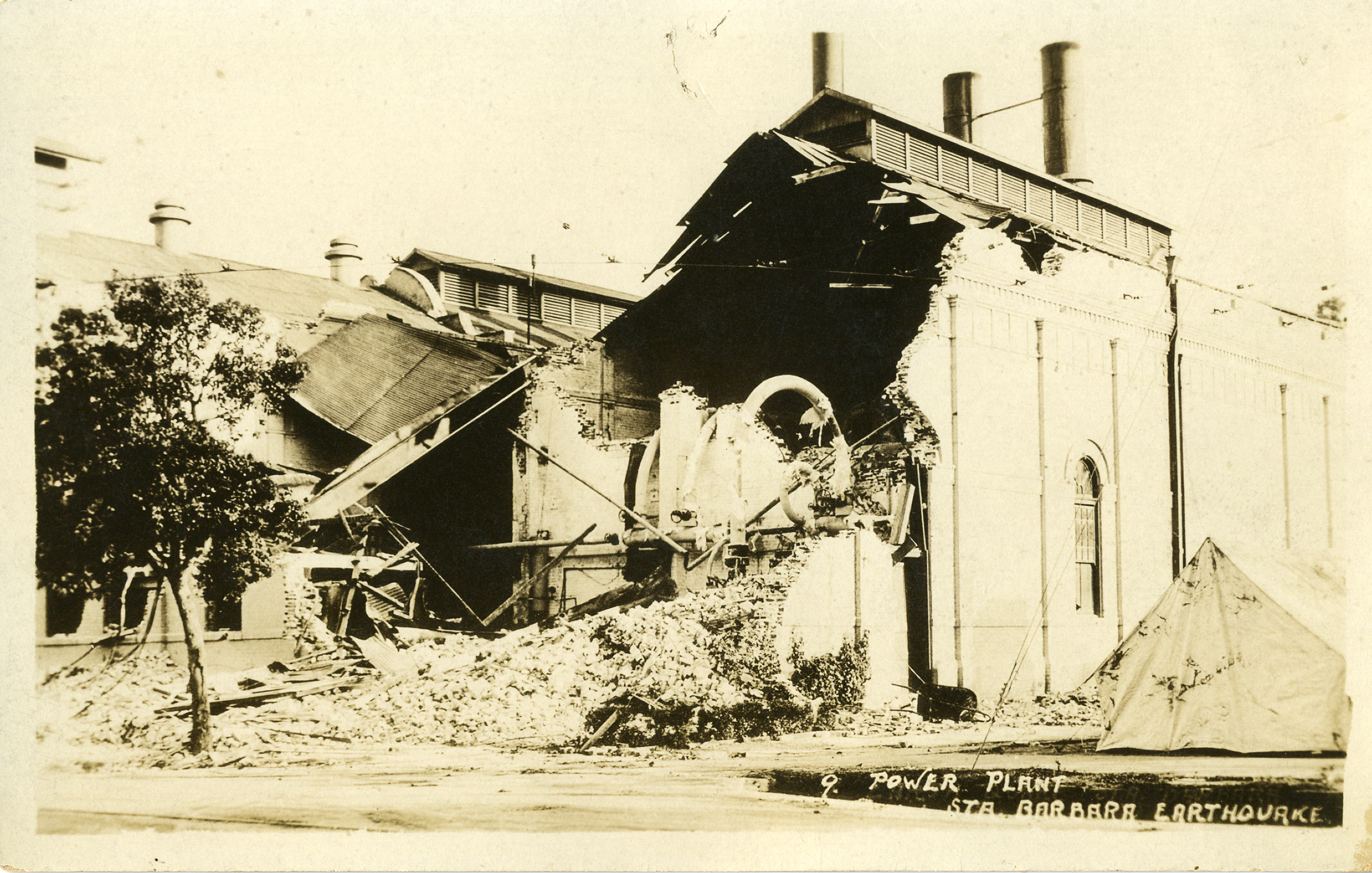
1925 Santa Barbara earthquake

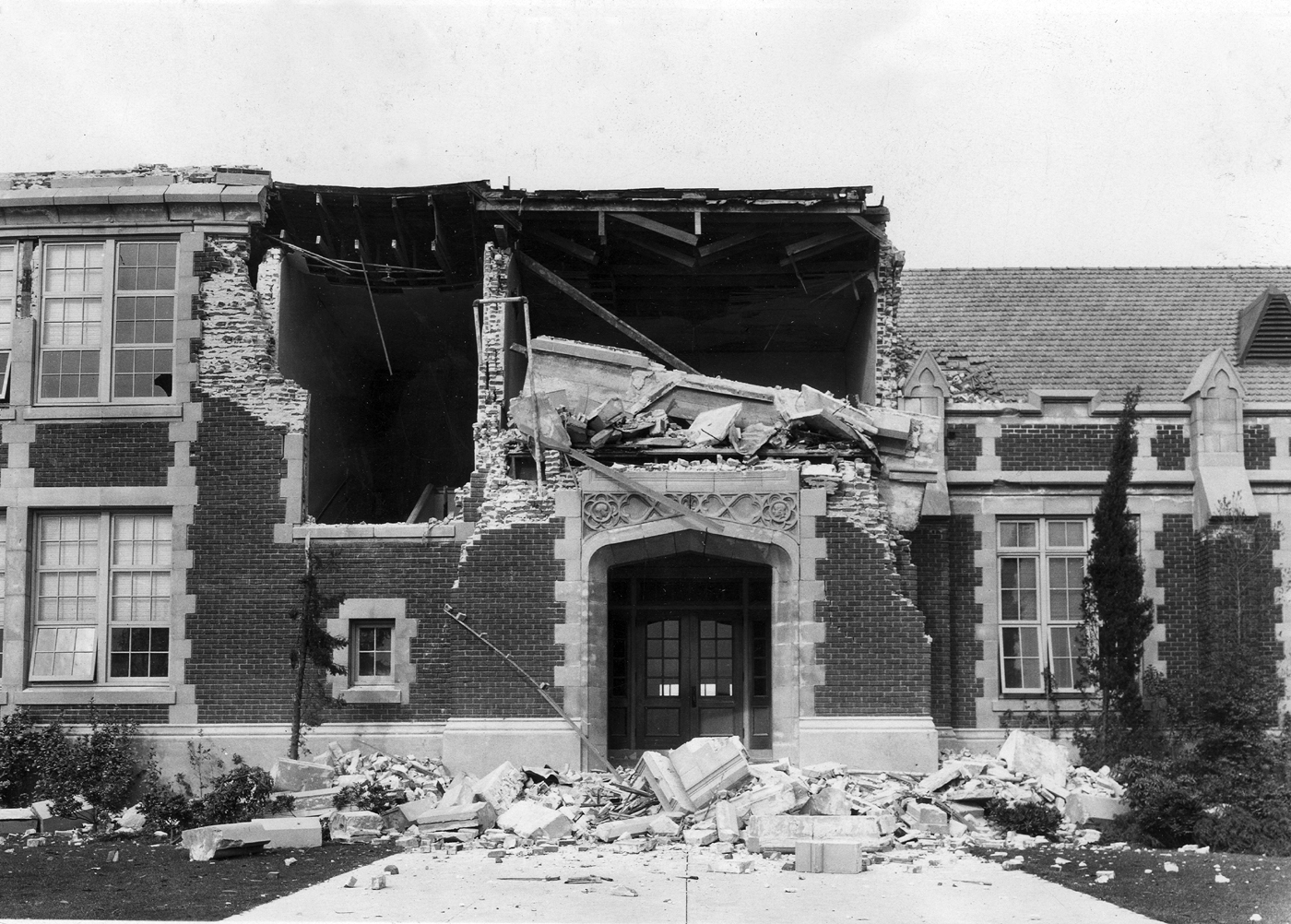
1933 Long Beach earthquake

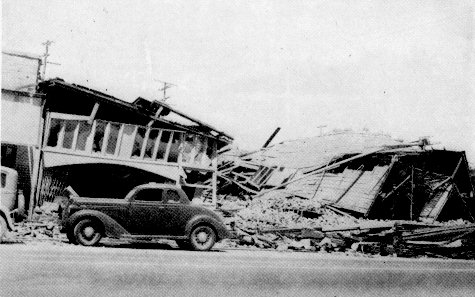
1940 El Centro earthquake

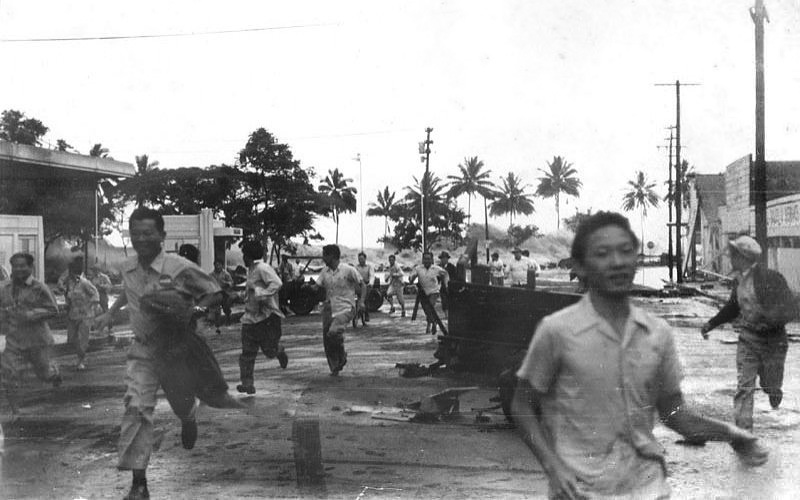
1946 Aleutian Islands earthquake

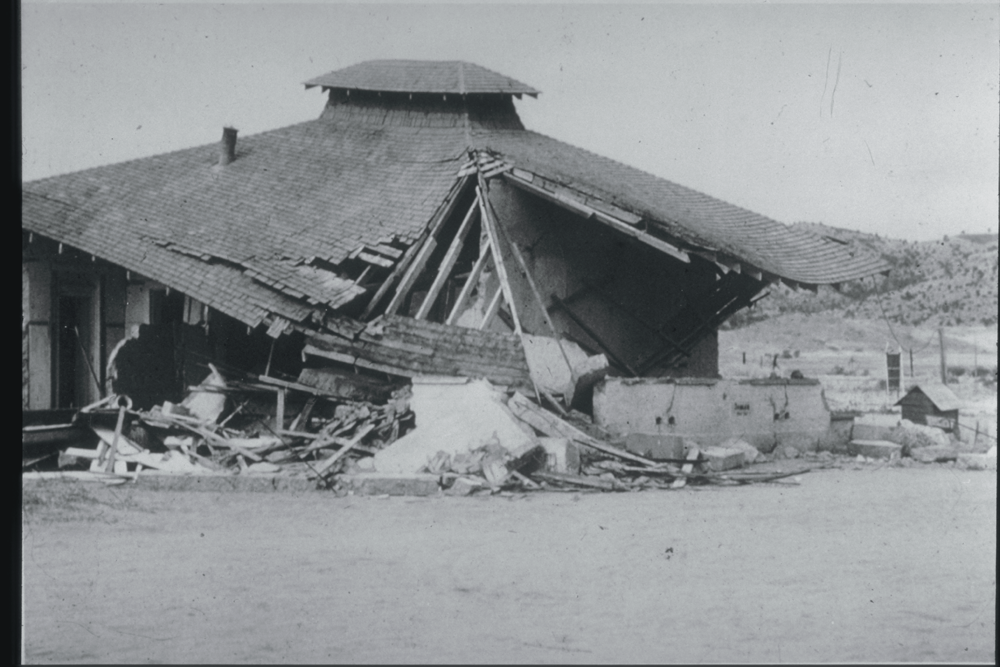
1952 Kern County earthquake

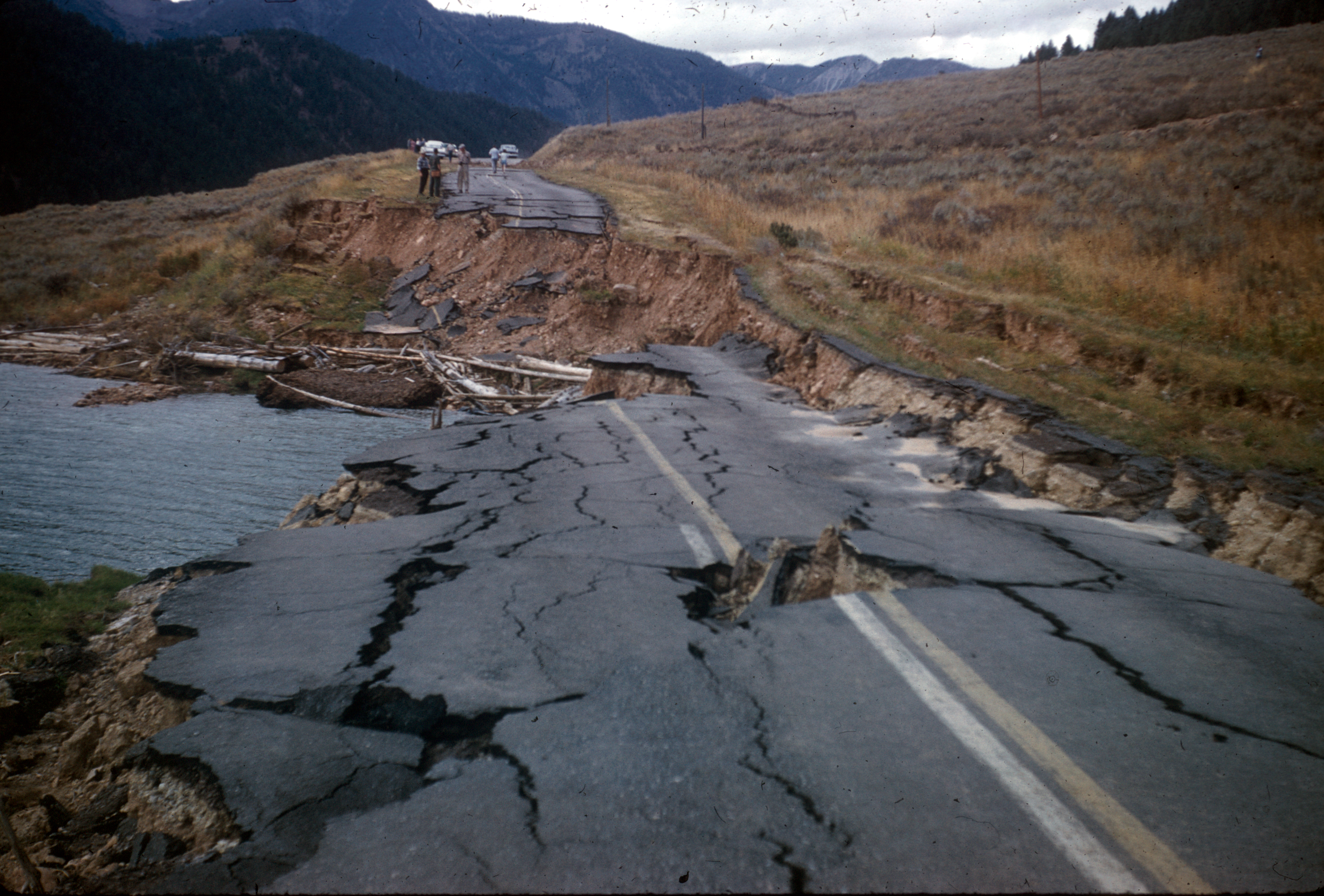
1959 Hebgen Lake earthquake

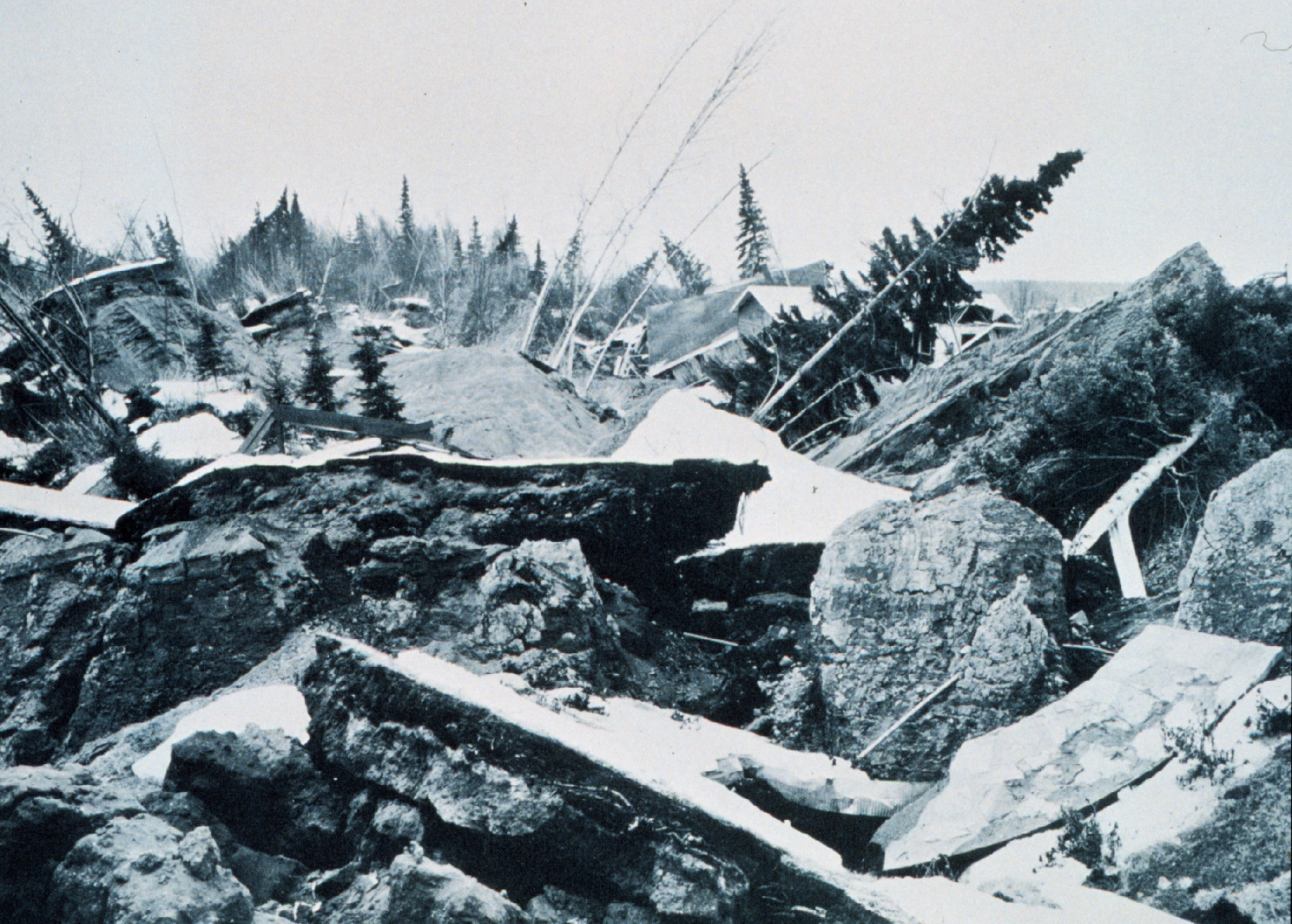
1964 Alaska earthquake

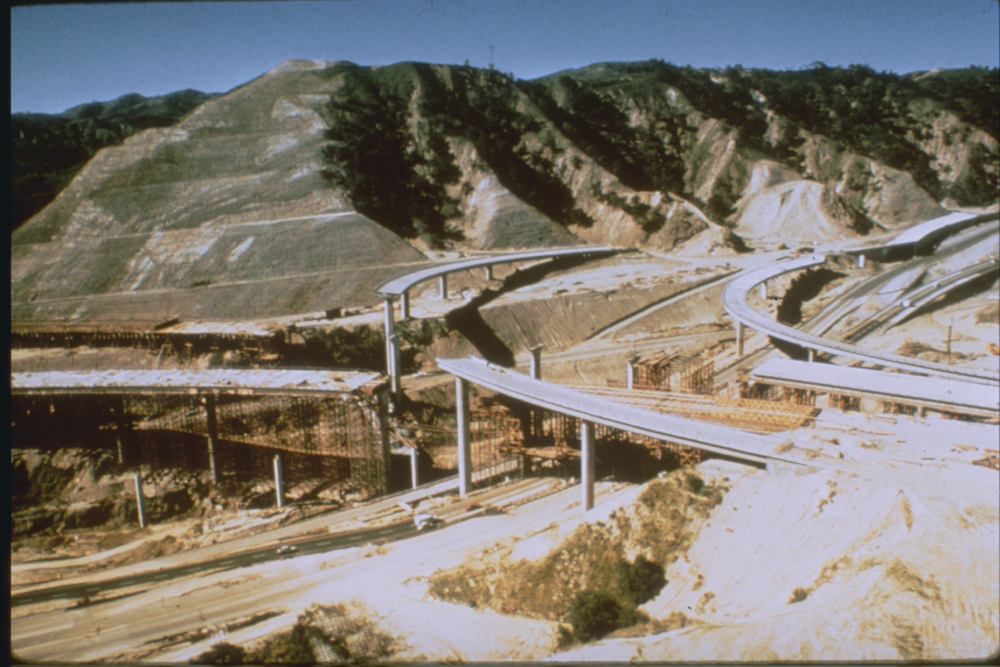
1971 San Fernando earthquake

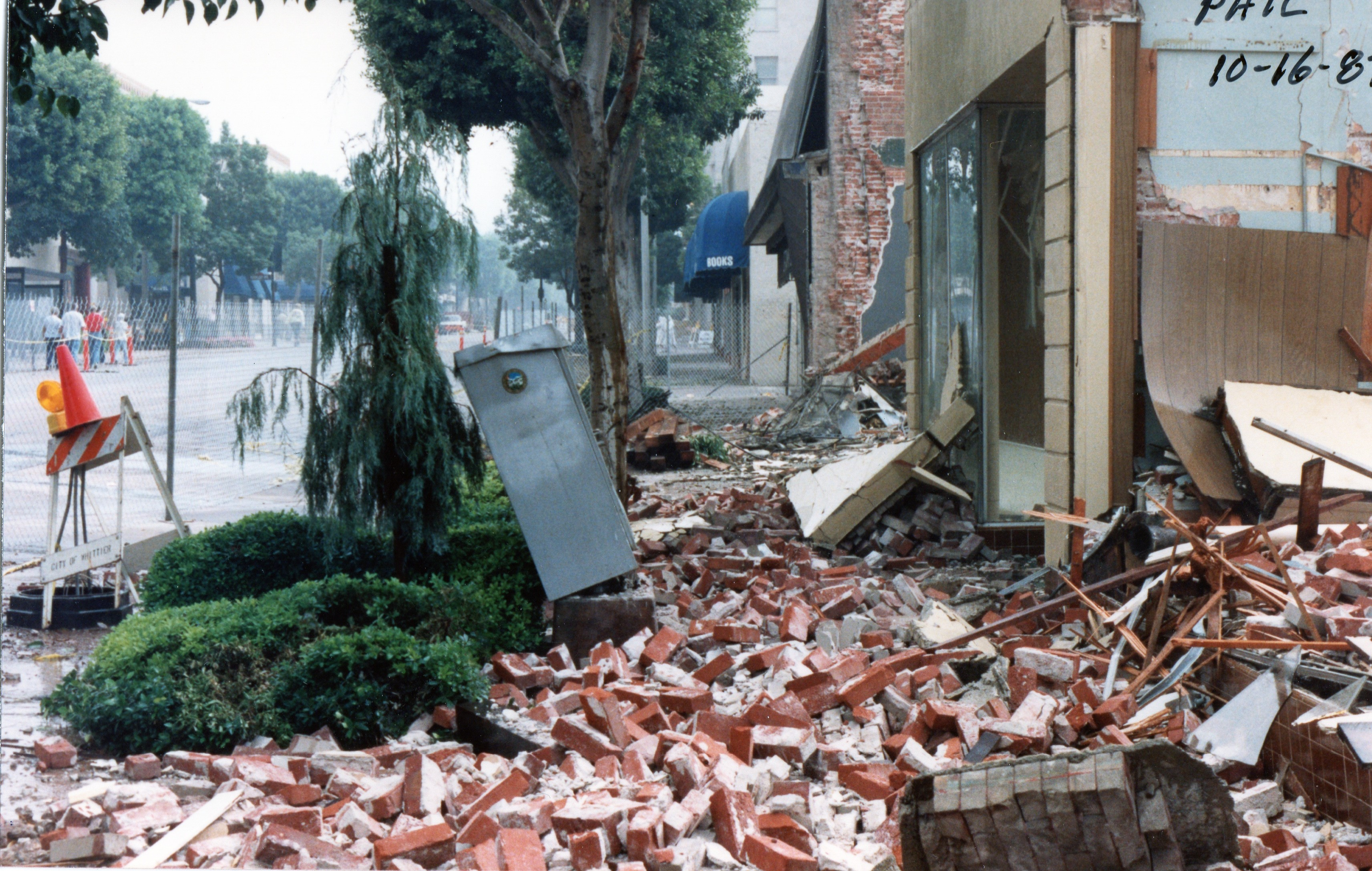
1987 Whittier Narrows earthquake

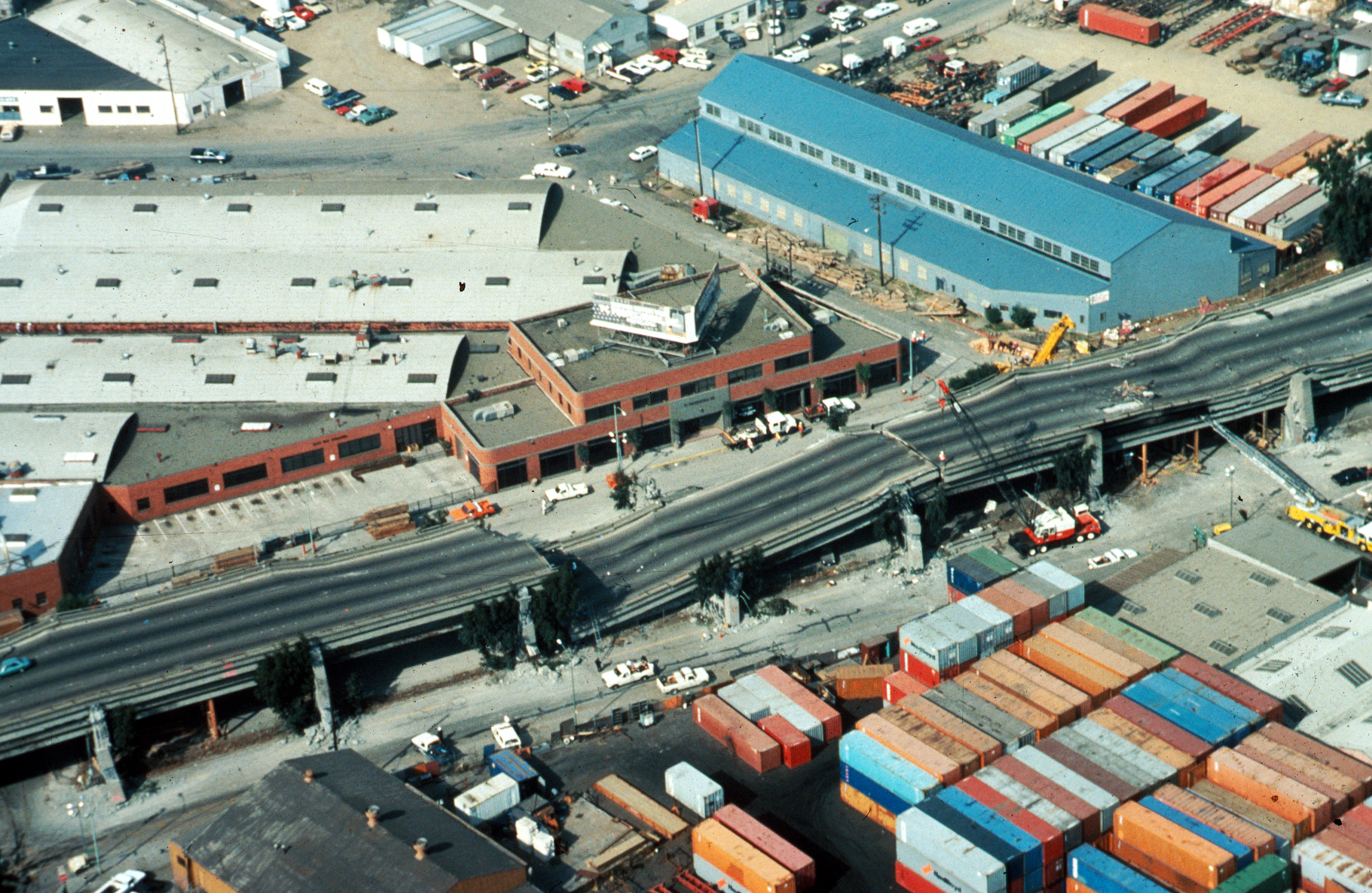
1989 Loma Prieta earthquake

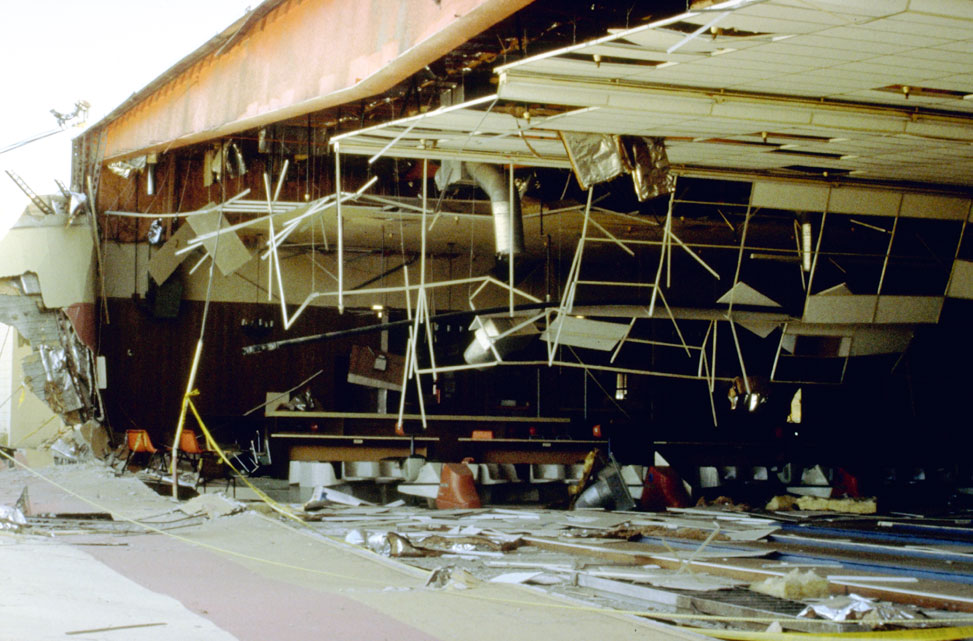
1992 Landers earthquake

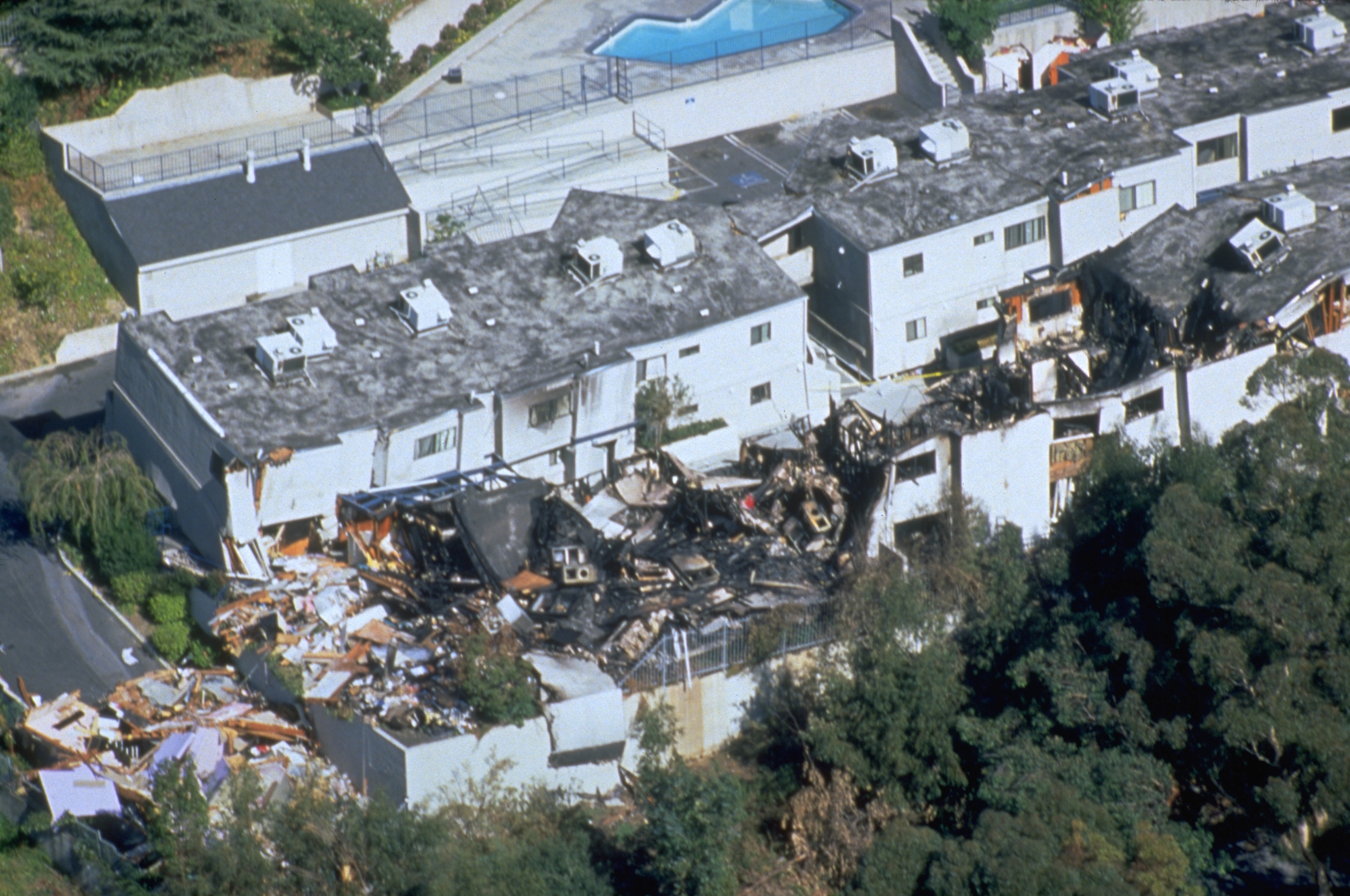
1994 Northridge earthquake

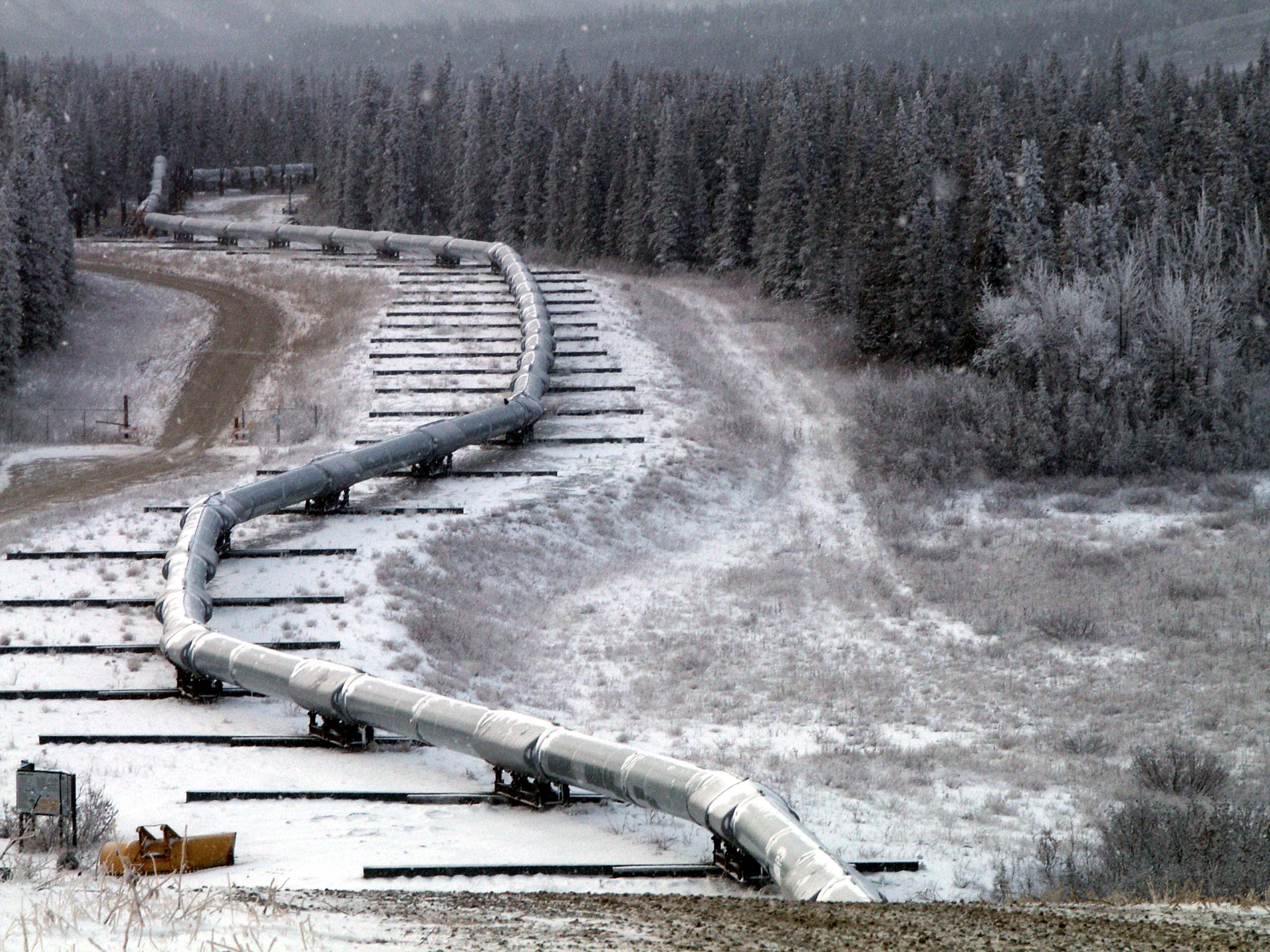
2002 Denali earthquake

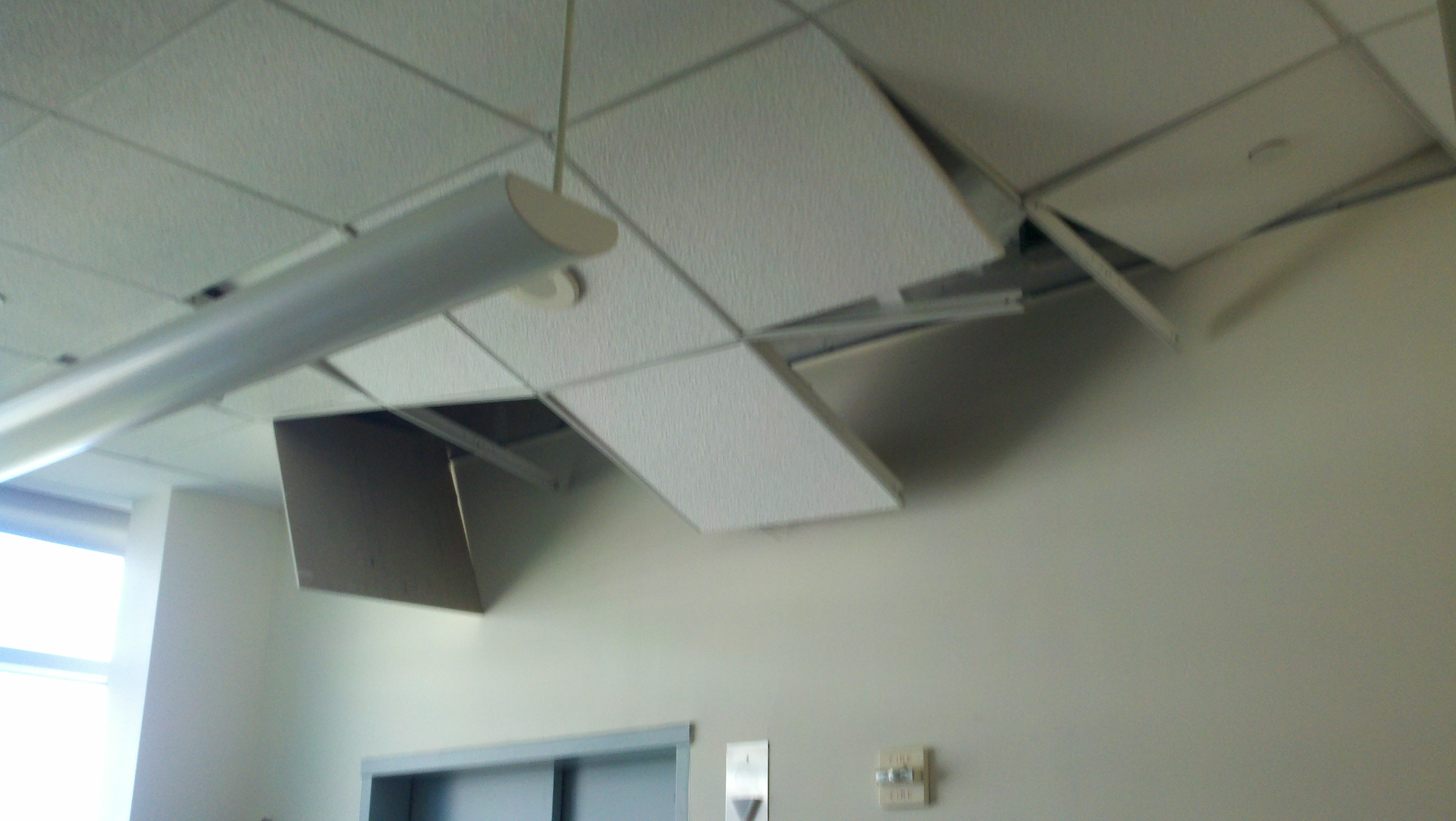
2011 Virginia earthquake

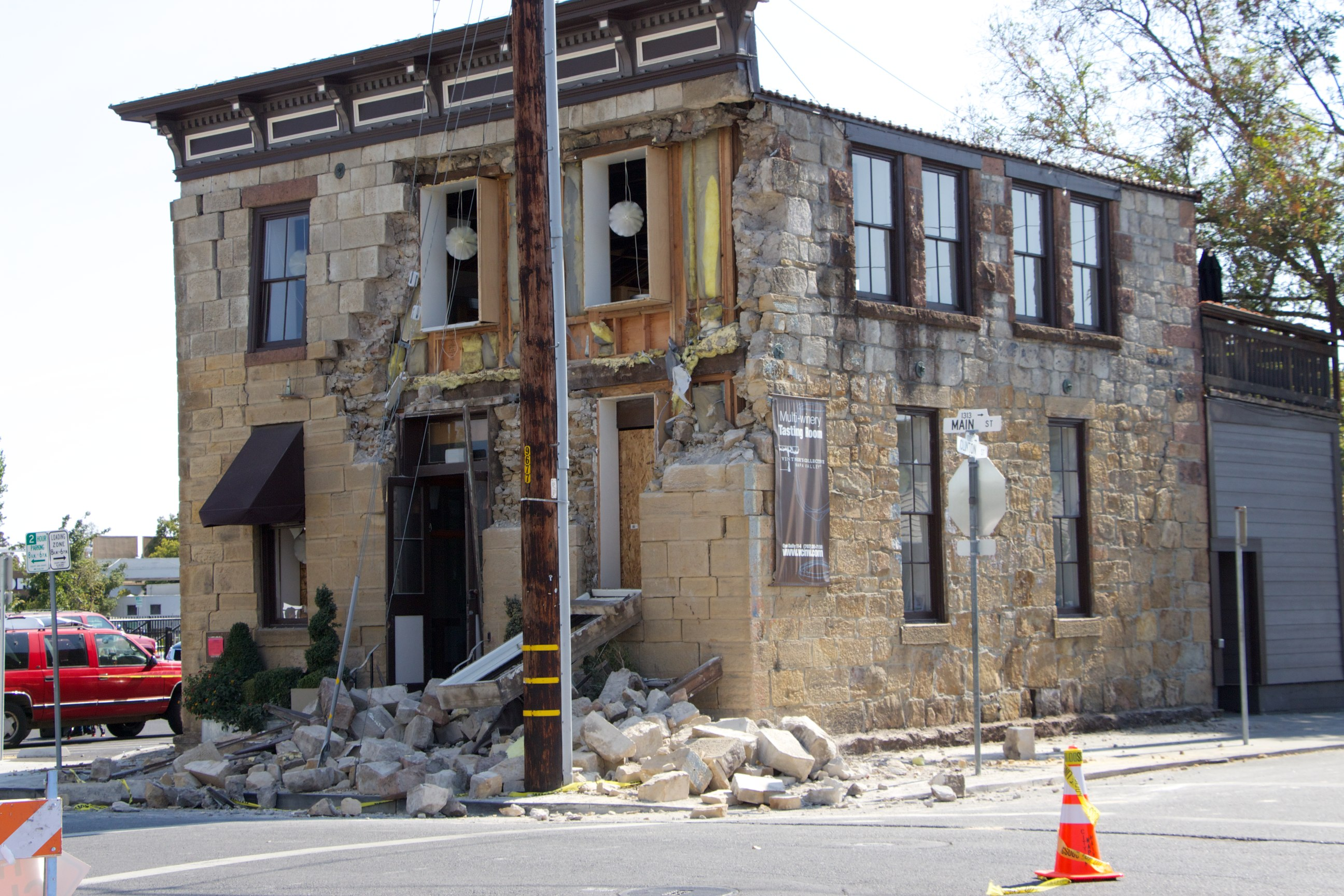
2014 South Napa earthquake

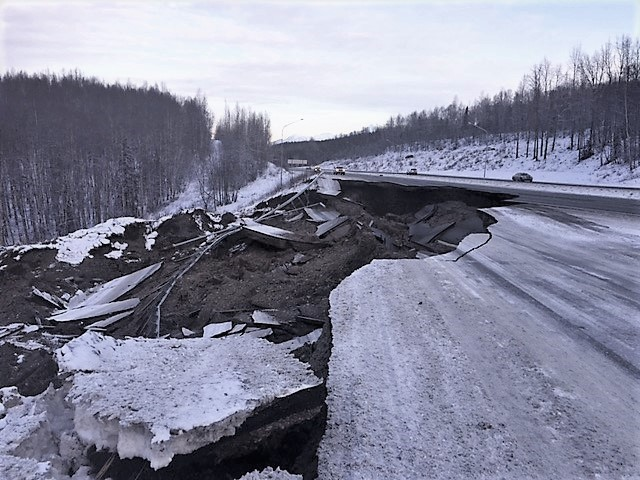
2018 Anchorage earthquake

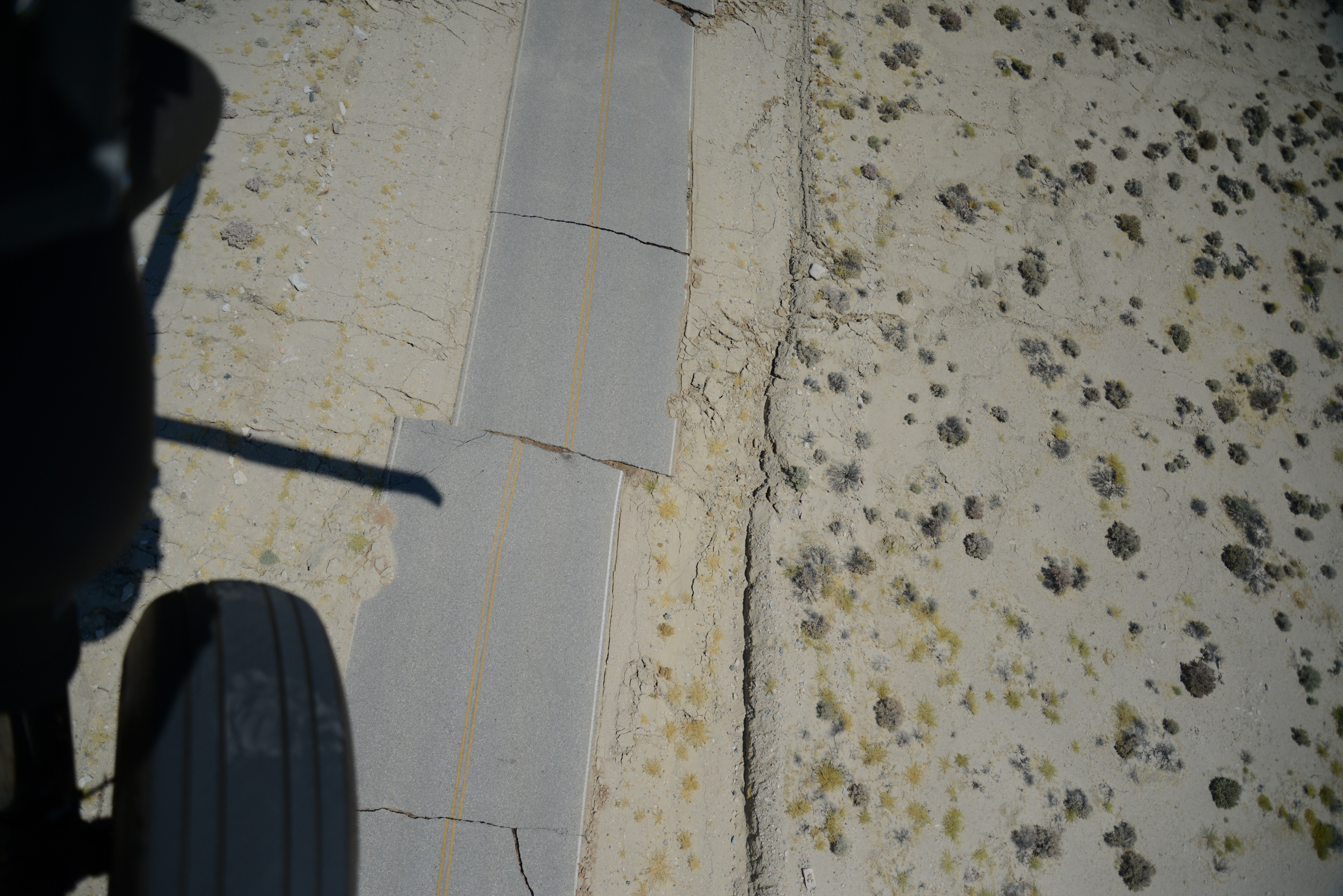
2019 Ridgecrest earthquakes

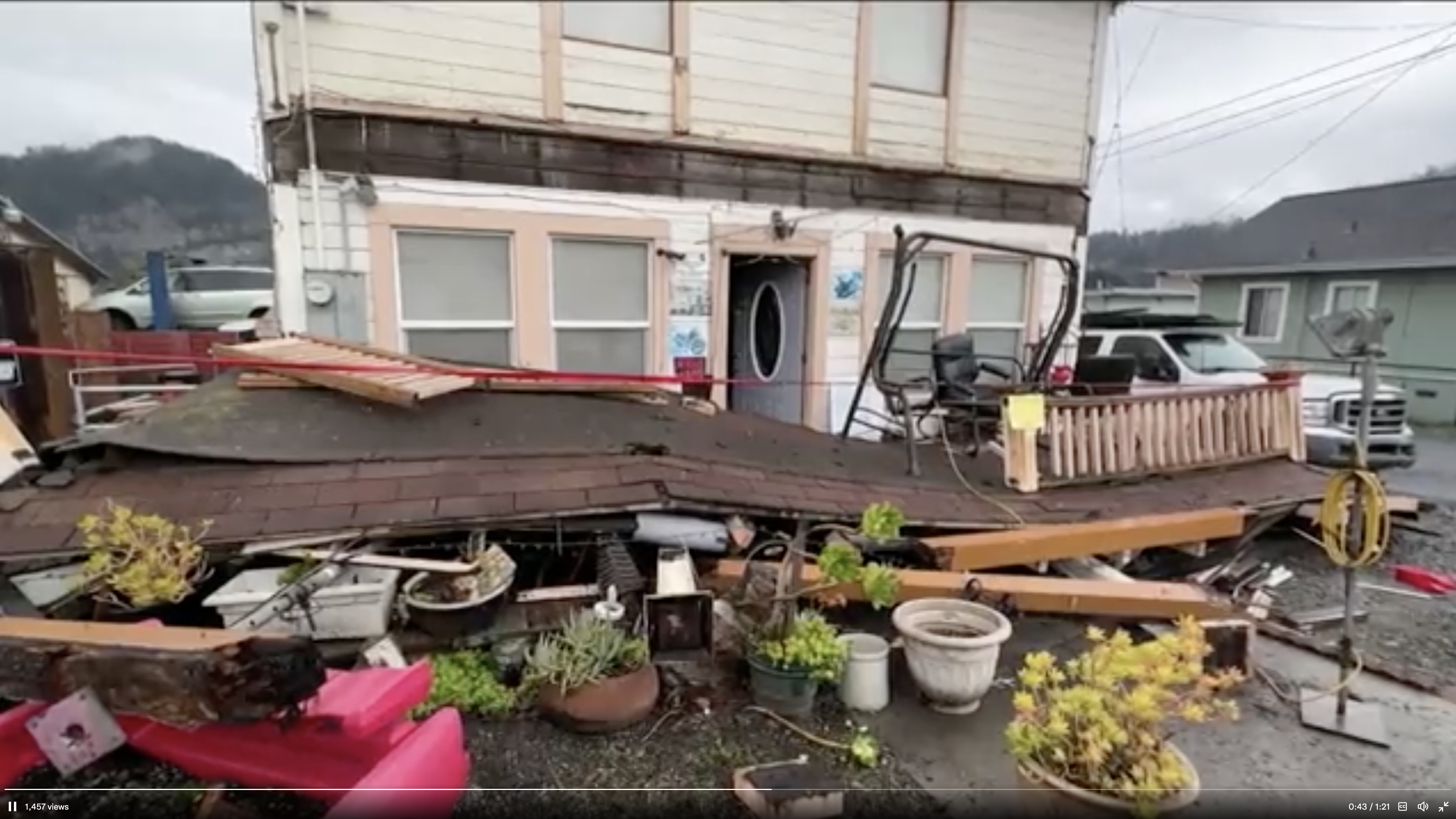
2022 Ferndale earthquake

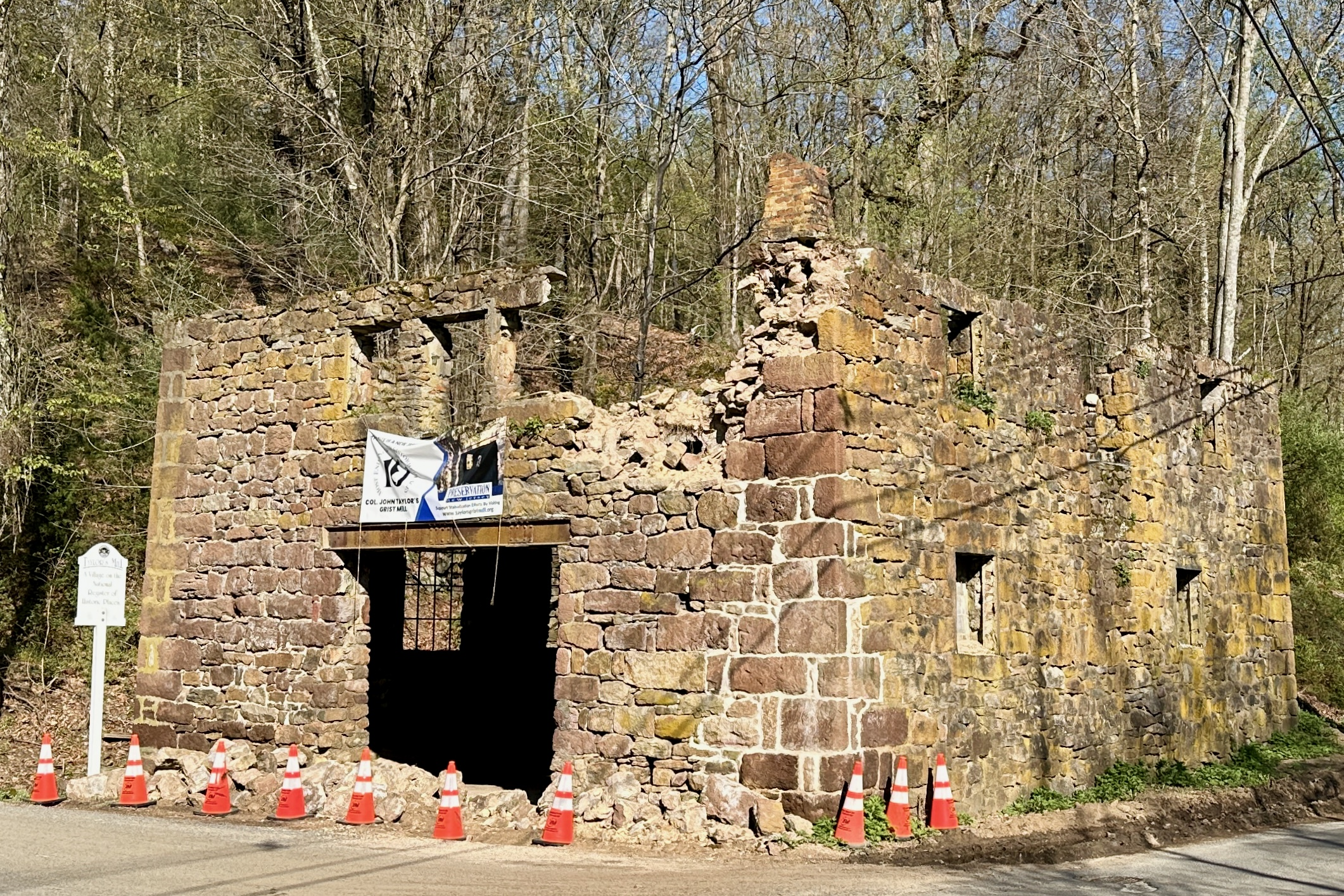
2024 New Jersey earthquake

== See also ==
- Geology of North America
- Geology of the United States
- List of tsunamis
- Lists of earthquakes
  - List of earthquakes in Alaska
  - List of earthquakes in California
  - List of earthquakes in Hawaii
  - List of earthquakes in Illinois
  - List of earthquakes in Kansas
  - List of earthquakes in Montana
  - List of earthquakes in Nevada
  - List of earthquakes in Puerto Rico
  - List of earthquakes in Texas
  - List of earthquakes in Utah
  - List of earthquakes in Virginia
  - List of earthquakes in Washington
