= 1940 New Hampshire earthquakes =

Natural disasters in U.S. state

- Location within New Hampshire
- UTC time: Doublet earthquake: A: 1940-12-20 07:27:26; B: 1940-12-24 13:43:44
- ISC event: A: 901740; B: 901745
- USGS-ANSS: n/a
- Local date: A: 20 December 1940; B: 24 December 1940
- Local time: A: 02:27:26; B: 08:43:44
- Magnitude: A: 5.5 m_{N} 5.6 M_{GR}^{(PAS)}, 5.25 M_{w} (est.); B: 5.5 m_{N} 5.6 M_{GR}^{(PAS)} 5.50 M_{w} (est.)
- Depth: 35 km (22 mi)
- Epicenter: 43.83°N 71.28°W
- Type: Unknown
- Areas affected: New England; United States
- Max. intensity: MMI VII (Very strong)

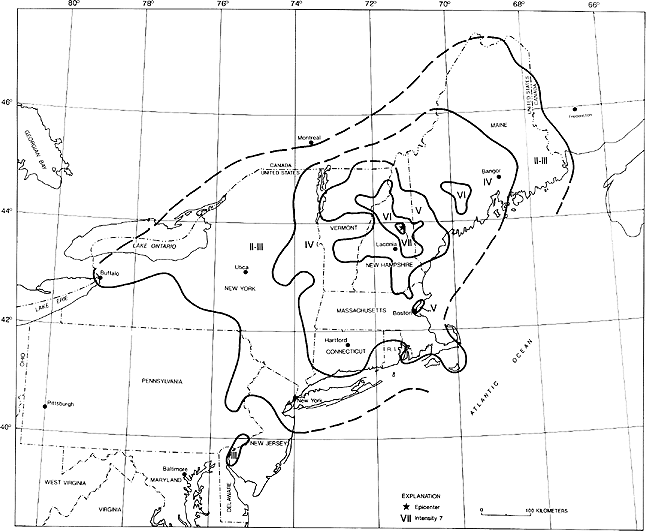
Isoseismal map for the 1940 New Hampshire earthquakes

The 1940 New Hampshire earthquakes struck on December 20 and again on December 24. Both shocks had an estimated M_{s} magnitude of 5.6, and a maximum Mercalli intensity of VII (Very strong). These doublet earthquakes were the largest to hit the state in several hundred years. Damage included minor fractures or knocked over chimneys in a zone extending through New Hampshire and four other states: Maine, New York, Vermont and Massachusetts.

== History ==
While not known for earthquakes, New Hampshire has been dotted with both major and minor events. Two examples of strong earthquakes occurred in the 17th century. One was the 1638 earthquake; the other significant event to strike the state was the 1663 Charlevoix earthquake, originating in the Saint Lawrence River fault zone. The extent of the earthquake is not firm, at least in the state, as the population was composed largely of colonial settlers who had left the east coast. The 1663 earthquake felled chimneys, oscillated houses, and threw pewter from shelves in the Massachusetts Bay area.

== Geography ==
Reports of the 1940 earthquake extended as far north as Montreal and Quebec in Canada, and included Maine, New York, New Jersey, Pennsylvania, northeastern Delaware, Massachusetts, Vermont and Rhode Island. The epicenter was next to the Ossipee Mountains, near the town of Ossipee, New Hampshire. These mountains are the remains of an ancient volcanic ring dike. A similar ring dike can be seen in southern New Hampshire at Pawtuckaway State Park.

== Damage ==
Both earthquakes had surface magnitudes estimated at 5.5 and a Mercalli intensity of VII, and spawned waves of minor damage. There were reports of fractured pipes, walls, and furniture, as well as "fallen plaster" near the epicenter. The number of chimneys damaged totaled 20, in addition to fallen ones. The earthquake caused damage to wells, turning the water brown and displayed strength by movement, causing five monuments to shift from their original position at a cemetery, and moving one old house in the village of Wonalancet roughly 12 inches (30 cm). The earthquake additionally shifted objects as heavy as stoves. Aftershocks of the earthquake occurred over the next several months.

== See also ==
- List of earthquakes in 1940
- List of earthquakes in the United States

== Sources ==
- Billings, M. P. (1942), "Geology of the Central Area of the Ossipee Mountains, New Hampshire, earthquakes", Bulletin of the Seismological Society of America, 32 (2), Seismological Society of America: 83–92, Bibcode:1942BuSSA..32...83B, doi:10.1785/BSSA0320020083, archived from the original on December 14, 2016.
- Devlin, J. J.; Langguth, L. C.; Arringdale, R. L. (1942), "Macroseismic study of the New Hampshire earthquakes of December 1940", Bulletin of the Seismological Society of America, 32 (2), Seismological Society of America: 67–73, Bibcode:1942BuSSA..32...67D, doi:10.1785/BSSA0320020067.
- Don Leet, L.; Linehan, D. (1942), "Instrumental study of the New Hampshire earthquakes of December, 1940", Bulletin of the Seismological Society of America, 32 (2), Seismological Society of America: 75–82, Bibcode:1942BuSSA..32...75L, doi:10.1785/BSSA0320020075, archived from the original on September 8, 2008.
- International Seismological Centre, Bulletin of the ISC, Thatcham, United Kingdom
- Stover, C. W.; Coffman, J. L. (1993), Seismicity of the United States, 1568–1989 (Revised), U.S. Geological Survey Professional Paper 1527, United States Government Printing Office.
- Gutenberg, B.; Richter, C. F. (1954), Seismicity of the Earth and Associated Phenomena (2nd ed.), Princeton University Press, 310p.
