= 1909 Wabash River earthquake =

1909 Midwestern earthquake

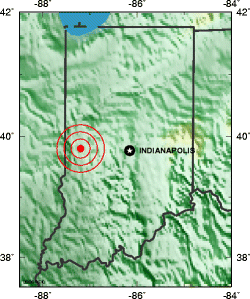
- UTC time: 1909-09-27 09:45
- ISC event: n/a
- USGS-ANSS: ComCat
- Local date: September 27, 1909
- Local time: 04:45
- Magnitude: 5.1 M_{fa}
- Epicenter: 39.8°N 87.2°W
- Type: Unknown
- Areas affected: Indiana; United States
- Max. intensity: MMI VII (Very strong)
- Casualties: None

The 1909 Wabash River earthquake occurred at 04:45 local time on September 27 with a maximum Mercalli intensity of VII (very strong). It measured 5.1 on a seismic scale that is based on an isoseismal map or the event's felt area. With moderate damage in the Wabash River Valley, it is currently the strongest earthquake recorded in the U.S. state of Indiana. The earthquake occurred somewhere along a fault within the Wabash Valley seismic zone.

== Damage ==
The earthquake was felt over an area of 30,000 square miles. In Terre Haute, the earthquake toppled two chimneys, cracked plaster, and knocked pictures from walls. Nearby Covington, north of Terre Haute in Fountain County, experienced several fallen chimneys and some broken windows. Chimneys were "jarred loose" in Princeton, Indiana, and one chimney was even "shaken to pieces" at Olivette, Missouri (a suburb of St. Louis). A brick wall was also "shook" down within St. Louis, Missouri. Reports came from various states, including Arkansas, Illinois, Iowa, Kentucky, Ohio, and Tennessee.

== See also ==
- 1947 Wisconsin earthquake
- List of earthquakes in 1909
- List of earthquakes in the United States
