= List of earthquakes in Utah =

This is a list of moderate to large earthquakes that have occurred in Utah. Only earthquakes with a magnitude of 5.0 or greater are listed. Aftershocks are not included, unless they were of great significance or contributed to a death toll. Earthquakes occur frequently in Utah, though they tend to be small (below a 5.0 magnitude).

The highest-risk zone is along the Wasatch Front, where most of the state's population is located. The larger cities include the state's capital, Salt Lake City, as well as Lehi, Ogden, Orem, Provo, Sandy, and West Valley City.

== Chronological list ==
Date	Name of Quake	Location	Mag	Depth	Lat	Long	Deaths	Notes	Refs
November 13, 1901	1901 Richfield	Richfield	7.0		38.77°N	112.08°W	0		
September 30, 1921	1921 Sevier Valley	Elsinore	6.3		38.68°N	112.15°W	0	There were three main shocks: two on Sep. 29 and one on Oct. 1.	
March 12, 1934	1934 Hansel Valley	Great Salt Lake (just north of the lake)	6.6 M_{W}	10.0 km (6.2 mi)	41.7°N	112.8°W	2		
August 30, 1962	1962 Cache Valley	Cache Valley	5.9 M_{L}		41.92°N	111.63°W	0		
October 4, 1967	1967 5.6	Marysvale	5.6 M_{W}	7.0 km (4.3 mi)	38.540°N	112.160°W	0		
January 30, 1989	1989 5.2	Salina Canyon, Sevier County	5.2	19.0 km (11.8 mi)	38.831°N	111.620°W	0		
September 2, 1992	1992 St. George	St. George	5.8 M_{W}	13.9 km (8.6 mi)	37.1°N	113.497°W	0		
March 18, 2020	2020 Salt Lake City	Magna	5.7 M_{W}	11.7 km (7.3 mi)	40.851°N	112.081°W	0		

== See also ==
- List of earthquakes in Nevada
