= 1901 Richfield earthquake =

Earthquake in Utah

- Location within Utah
- UTC time: 1901-11-14 04:39:00
- USGS-ANSS: ComCat
- Local date: 13 November 1901
- Local time: 09:39 p.m. MST
- Magnitude: 7.0 M_{w}
- Depth: 10.0 km (6.2 mi)
- Epicenter: 38.77°N 112.08°W
- Areas affected: Utah
- Max. intensity: MMI IX (Violent)
- Landslides: multiple
- Aftershocks: >35
- Casualties: none

The 1901 Richfield earthquake was a magnitude M_{w} 7.0 earthquake that occurred on 13 November 1901 at approximately 9:39 PM MST at Richfield, Utah, United States. If estimations are accurate, it is the largest earthquake ever recorded in Utah.

== Earthquake ==
The earthquake struck at approximately 9:39 PM MST approximately 1.2 miles (1.9 km) south of Richfield, Utah, United States. Reports of the length of the quake varied from about one minute to three minutes. There were three waves—increasing in power—to the initial quake, and "roaring" or "low rumbling" sounds accompanying the shock waves were reported in Fillmore, Cedar City, and Salt Lake City.

The time of the quake is officially recorded by the Intermountain Seismic Belt Historical Earthquake Project (ISBHEP) as 9:39 PM MST. The USGS report gives an official time as 9:32 PM MST. News reports from the time give times ranging from 9:30 PM MST to 10:45 PM MST.

=== Magnitude and intensity ===
The quake was recorded by the ISBHEP as a M_{w} 6.5 and an intensity of IX (Violent). The official USGS report in their historical earthquakes list stated no magnitude and an intensity of VIII (Severe). An official report published in 1988 assigned a magnitude of M_{w} 7 and an intensity of IX (Violent).

The quake was felt in an area of 50,000 square miles (130,000 km^{2}), including Cedar City (intensity VI), Oasis, and Fillmore. Salt Lake City (with intensity of IV) is considered an "outlying point well outside the boundary of the main felt area."

== Destruction ==
Damage to chimneys, walls, roofs, windows was reported in Richfield, Beaver, Monroe, Joseph, Elsinore, and Marysvale, with minor damage reported in Parowan, Milford, Cedar City, St. George, and Kanab.

Surface ruptures up to 300 feet (91 m) in length were reported in Richfield, with water and white sand being ejected from some of the cracks. "Extensive rockslides" were reported between Beaver and Marysvale, especially in the canyons.

Damage in Beaver included Beaver Woolen Mills, with an estimated US$4,000 in severe structural damage (approximately US$121,000 in 2020). The roof of the Beaver County courthouse was crushed by chimneys collapsing onto it, and the walls of the building were cracked in over 25 places. Additional reports of lesser damage include a saloon, several merchant buildings, schools and related buildings, and a church building. Merchandise in several stores was also damaged.

Minor damage was reported as far away as Salt Lake City, where several landslides were reported in Little Cottonwood, Big Cottonwood, and Bullion Canyon. The landslides almost completely blocked the roads. Surface ruptures and increased river flow were also reported.

No people were killed in the quake.

== See also ==
- List of earthquakes in 1901
- List of earthquakes in the United States
- List of earthquakes in Utah
