= Guy–Greenbrier earthquake swarm =

Earthquake swarm in Arkansas, United States

Coordinates: 35.28°N 92.36°W

- Map of earthquake epicenters for the period August 6, 2010 to March 1, 2011
- UTC time: ??
- ISC event: n/a
- USGS-ANSS: n/a
- Local date: 2010–11
- Duration: Less than one year
- Type: Intraplate earthquakes
- Areas affected: Central Arkansas
- 4.7 M_{w}
- Total events: 150–160 earthquakes

The Guy–Greenbrier earthquake swarm occurred in central Arkansas beginning in August 2010. The epicenters of earthquakes in the swarm showed a linear distribution, with a clear overall shift in activity towards the southwest with time, and the largest event in the swarm was the 2011 Arkansas earthquake, at 4.7 on the moment magnitude scale.

== Cause ==
It has been suggested that the swarm was triggered by drilling activities associated with the exploration and production of shale gas in the Fayetteville Shale in northern Arkansas. Analysis of the swarm has found no link between this relatively shallow drilling and the earthquakes, but has instead suggested a link with deep waste disposal drilling similar to that identified at the Rocky Mountain Arsenal in the 1960s, and has led to a moratorium on such drilling being proposed covering an area of 1150 square miles (2980 km^{2}).

== See also ==
- List of earthquakes in 2010
- List of earthquakes in 2011
- List of earthquakes in the United States
- Enola earthquake swarm
- Oklahoma earthquake swarms (2009–present)
