= 1947 Wisconsin earthquake =

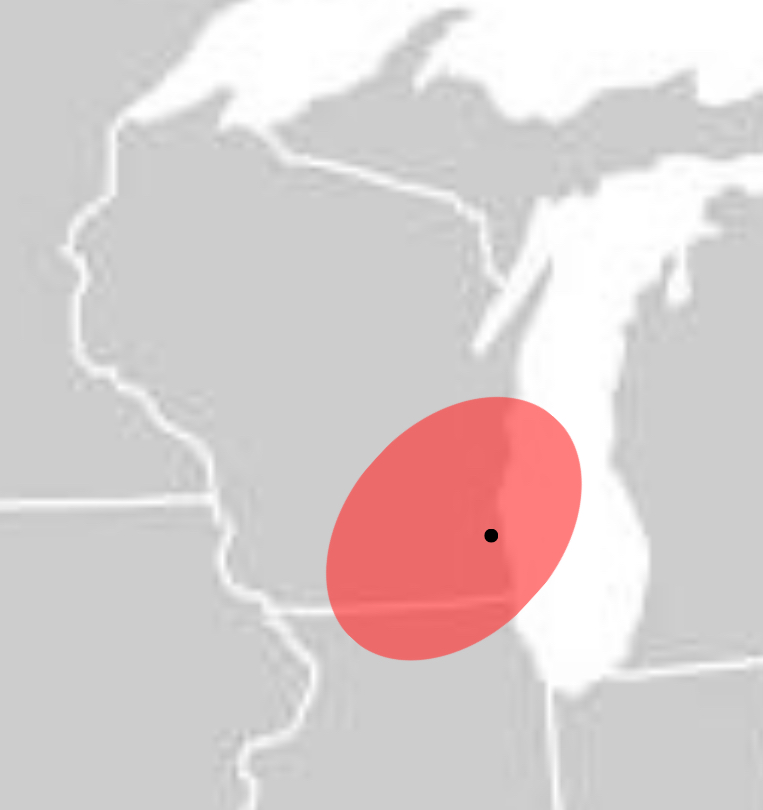
- 1947 Wisconsin earthquake approximate tremor area. The dot shows the location of Milwaukee.
- UTC time: 1947-05-06 20:25
- ISC event: n/a
- USGS-ANSS: n/a
- Local date: May 6, 1947
- Local time: 15:27 (CST)
- Magnitude: 4.2
- Epicenter: 43.05°N 87.95°W
- Max. intensity: MMI V (Moderate)

The 1947 Wisconsin earthquake took place on May 6, immediately south of Milwaukee at 15:27 (CST). It was the largest tremor to be historically documented in Wisconsin, but was not recorded by seismographs.

== History ==
The area had been previously shaken by the 1909 Wabash River earthquake, causing damage assessed at VII (Very strong) on the Modified Mercalli scale across the Wisconsin–Illinois border. Two earthquakes were also reported in the state in 1912. Shocks in 1919 and 1925, the first from Missouri and the latter from Canada, occurred over enormous zones and affected the entire region, though not seriously. Earthquakes struck Wisconsin again in 1937 and 1939.

== Earthquake ==
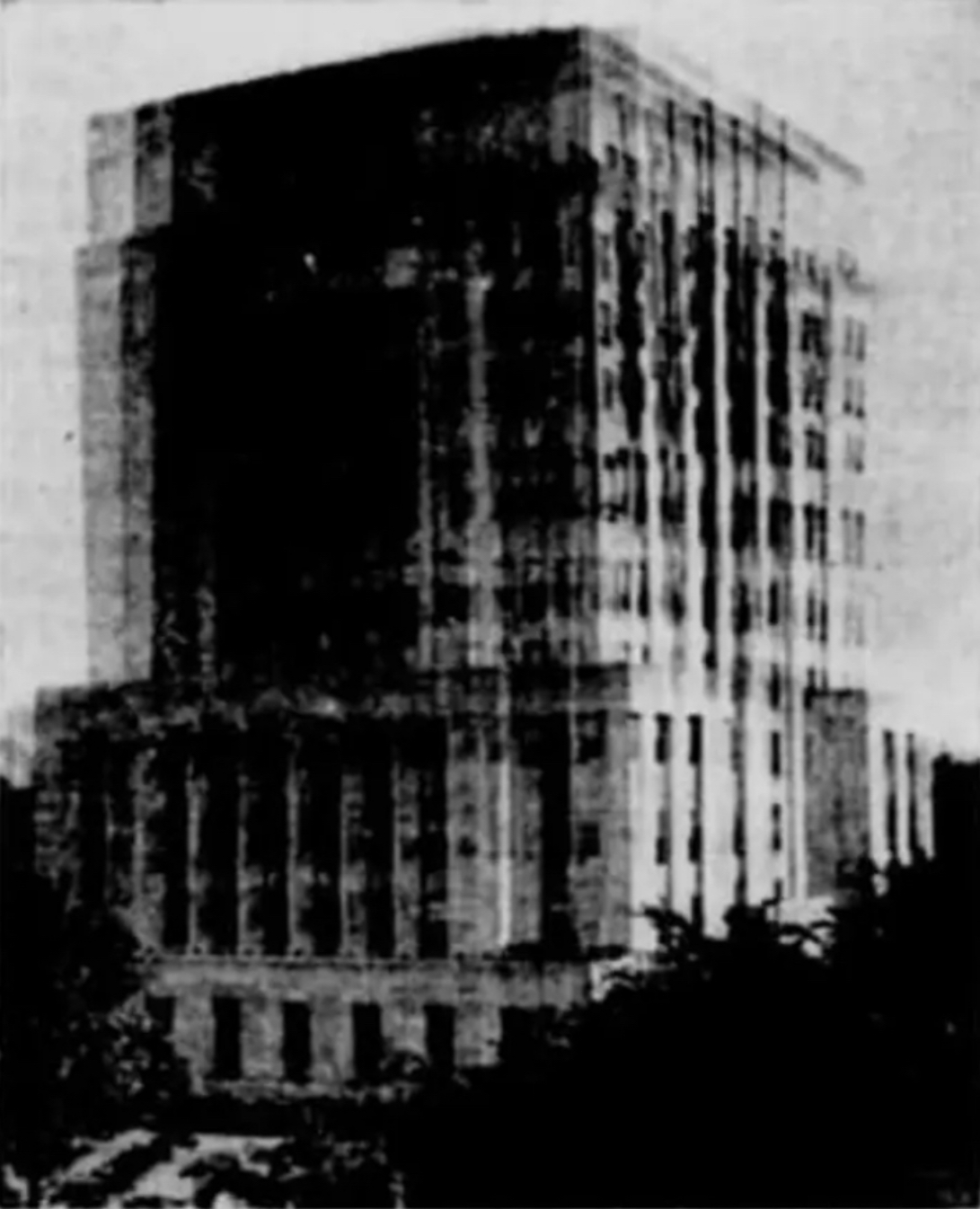
Artistic rendition of the Racine courthouse during the earthquake

For a few seconds at 15:27, the earthquake was felt in a 3,000-square-mile (7,770 km^{2}) strip of land in southeastern Wisconsin, in a 99-mile (159 km) wide area stretching across the Wisconsin–Illinois border, and to Lake Michigan and Waukesha.

== Damage ==
Damage consisted of broken windows and fallen porcelain, pots and dishes. The locals' initial impression was that an explosion had taken place. Many people evacuated buildings and ran into the streets. Corporate office buildings were emptied of workers. Numerous calls were made to local fire departments, police stations and newspapers. Three reports were made to the Milwaukee Fire Department, all describing explosions.

Often described as "sharp", this was the most powerful earthquake to date in Wisconsin's seismological history. The earthquake broke a seismograph at Marquette University. Many hotels, such as the Schroeder Hotel in Milwaukee, were rocked by the tremor. However, the earthquake caused no serious damage or casualties.

== See also ==
- List of earthquakes in 1947
- List of earthquakes in the United States
