= 2020 Alaska Peninsula earthquake =

2020 Alaska Peninsula earthquake may refer to:

- July 2020 Alaska Peninsula earthquake
- October 2020 Alaska Peninsula earthquake
