= 1986 Ohio earthquake =

Mb 5.0 earthquake in Ohio, United States

- Location within Ohio
- UTC time: 1986-01-31 16:46:18
- ISC event: 507285
- Local date: January 31, 1986
- Local time: 11:46:18 EST (UTC-5)
- Magnitude: M_{w} 5.0
- Depth: 6.0 km (3.7 mi)
- Epicenter: 41.64°N 81.14°W
- Max. intensity: MMI VI (Strong)
- Peak acceleration: 0.16 g
- Tsunami: None
- Landslides: None

On January 31, 1986, at 11:46 EST (16:46 UTC), an earthquake of M_{b} 5.0 struck 40 kilometres (25 mi) east of Cleveland, Ohio, and about 17 kilometres (11 mi) south of the Perry Nuclear Power Plant. The earthquake was felt over a broad area due to its location, including parts of the US such as the District of Columbia, and parts of Ontario, Canada. The earthquake generated relatively high accelerations (0.18 g) of short duration at the Perry plant. Thirteen aftershocks were detected in the following weeks, with six occurring within the first 8 days. Two of the aftershocks were felt. Magnitudes for the aftershocks ranged from about 0.5 to 2.5. Focal depths for all of the earthquakes ranged from 2 to 6 km (1.2 to 3.7 mi). Except for one small earthquake, all of the aftershocks occurred in a very tight cluster with a north-northeast orientation.

== Earthquake ==
The earthquake had a moment magnitude of 5.0 and a depth of 6 kilometres (4 mi). Its epicenter was 40 kilometres (25 mi) east of the city of Cleveland, but its exact location could not be found. Tremors were felt all across the Eastern United States, from Virginia to Northern Canada.

Few aftershocks were reported within the next weeks, but they were relatively weak, with the strongest being reported had a magnitude of 2.5. No damage was reported.

== See also ==
- List of earthquakes in the United States
