= Enola earthquake swarm =

2001 series of earthquakes in Arkansas, United States

The Enola earthquake swarm was a series of earthquakes in 2001 that centered on Central Arkansas. It follows the earthquake swarms of Arkansas in the 1980s, and predates the Guy-Greenbrier earthquake swarm that started in 2010. The earthquake sequence started with a 4.4 magnitude main shock and 2,500 earthquakes followed in the next 2 months. These events resulted in a linear cumulative seismicity rate with a b value of nearly 1.0, which is an unusual result as compared to swarms other places. The swarm created damage and in May 2001 the swarm increased activity with the notable 4.4 earthquake. The after shocks exceeding a magnitude of 2.0. These earthquakes have not been linked to the more well known New Madrid Seismic Zone.
