= 1638 New Hampshire earthquake =

Magnitude 6 Earthquake (June 1 1638) affecting New England USA

- Location within New Hampshire
- USGS-ANSS: ComCat
- Local date: June 11, 1638
- Local time: 1–2 p.m.
- Magnitude: 6.5±0.5 mb_{Lg}
- Epicenter: 43.3°N 71.6°W
- Areas affected: British America
- Max. intensity: MMI IX (Violent)

The 1638 New Hampshire earthquake struck central New Hampshire on 11 June 1638 (1 June on the Julian calendar). It was the first major earthquake to strike New England following the start of European colonization. Modern analysis places its epicenter somewhere near what is now central New Hampshire, with an estimated magnitude between 6.0 and 7.0 mb_{Lg}. This makes it the largest earthquake on record in New Hampshire and New England, and the second strongest in northeastern North America after the 1663 Charlevoix earthquake.

== See also ==
- 1755 Cape Ann earthquake
- List of historical earthquakes
