= 1882 Fort Collins earthquake =

Earthquake in Colorado, US

- Location within Colorado Location within the United States
- UTC time: 1882-11-08 19:30:00
- ISC event
- USGS-ANSS: ComCat
- Local date: November 7, 1882
- Local time
- Magnitude: M_{fa} 6.2, M_{w} 6.6±0.6
- Epicenter: 40.5°N 105.5°W
- Areas affected: Northern Colorado; United States
- Max. intensity: MMI VII (Very strong)

The 1882 Fort Collins earthquake or Front Range earthquake measured M_{w} 6.6 and struck near Fort Collins, Colorado at 1:30 UTC on November 8, which was 18:30 on the November 7. The earthquake occurred as the result of deformation within the Front Range and caused shaking as strong as Modified Mercalli intensity (MMI) VII (Very Strong). Shaking was felt as far away as Salt Lake City, Utah and Salina, Kansas. An aftershock struck locally at 04:45 on November 8 and was felt as far as Laramie, Wyoming and Meeker, Colorado. It is the largest earthquake in Colorado's history.

== Tectonic setting ==
The Southern Rocky Mountains are still actively growing due to the Laramide orogeny. The Front Range accommodates some of this as a deformation front of the orogeny. Stresses in this region are generally northwest–southeast oriented. The causative fault of this specific earthquake is unknown, but other earthquakes such as the 1984 Wyoming earthquake struck at a depth of 20 km (12 mi).

== Earthquake ==
The M_{w} 6.6 (Note: M_{w} 6.6±0.6, M_{fa} 6.2) earthquake struck at 01:30 on November 8 in UTC time, or 18:30 on November 7. The earthquake caused Modified Mercalli intensity (MMI) VII (Very Strong) shaking in various localities near in the Front Range urban corridor and was felt over an area of 470,000 km^{2} (180,000 sq mi). Due to the sparseness of the epicentral region, very little is known about where exactly the earthquake occurred. An aftershock of magnitude 4.5 to 5.0 was also felt in the urban corridor. This earthquake is the largest known to have occurred in the state of Colorado.

== Damage ==
At the University of Colorado Boulder, plaster fell from the ceiling. In Denver, some bolts snapped and bent at an electric light plant. In La Porte, a wooden house suffered cracking. At Thompson, a house's walls were severely cracked and the plaster on some walls came off. Glass windows broke in Laramie.

== Sources ==
- Kirkham, Robert M.; Rogers, William P. (1986). An Interpretation Of The November 7, 1882 Colorado Earthquake (Report). doi:10.58783/cgs.of8608.ujor4101.
- Kirkham, Robert M.; Rogers, William P. (1985). Bulletin 46 – Colorado Earthquake Data and Interpretations 1867–1985 (Report). doi:10.58783/cgs.b46.fdpq8494.
- Spence, William; Langer, C. J.; Choy, George L. (December 1, 1996). "Rare, large earthquakes at the Laramide deformation front—Colorado (1882) and Wyoming (1984)". Bulletin of the Seismological Society of America. 86 (6): 1804–1819. doi:10.1785/BSSA0860061804.
- Wong, Ivan G.; Humphrey, James R. (September 1, 1989). "Contemporary seismicity, faulting, and the state of stress in the Colorado Plateau". Geological Society of America Bulletin. 101 (9): 1127–1146. doi:10.1130/0016-7606(1989)101<1127:CSFATS>2.3.CO;2.
