= 1755 Cape Ann earthquake =

Magnitude 6 earthquake (November 18, 1755) off the coast of Massachusetts

- Location within Massachusetts
- USGS-ANSS: ComCat
- Local date: November 18, 1755
- Local time: 04:30
- Magnitude: 5.9 M_{w}
- Epicenter: 42.7°N 70.3°W
- Areas affected: British America, Province of Massachusetts Bay
- Max. intensity: MMI VIII (Severe)
- Tsunami: Possibly

The 1755 Cape Ann earthquake took place off the coast of the British Province of Massachusetts Bay (present-day Massachusetts) on November 18. At between 6.0 and 6.3 on the Richter scale, it remains the largest earthquake in the history of Massachusetts. No one was killed, but it damaged hundreds of buildings in Boston and was felt as far north as Nova Scotia and as far south as South Carolina. Sailors on a ship more than 200 miles (320 km) offshore felt the quake, and mistook it at first for their ship running aground. Many residents of Boston and the surrounding areas attributed the quake to God, and it occasioned a brief increase in religious fervor in the city. Modern studies estimate that if a similar quake shook Boston today, it would result in as much as $5 billion in damage and hundreds of deaths. Some discussion has revolved around the idea that this may have been a remotely triggered event from the 1755 Lisbon earthquake or its aftershocks.

== Earthquake ==
The earthquake took place on November 18, 1755, at approximately 4:30 AM local time. Future President of the United States John Adams, then staying at his father's house in Braintree, Massachusetts, was awakened by the quake, which impressed him so much that he began a diary that night. He wrote that the quake "continued near four minutes" and that "[t]he house seemed to rock and reel and crack as if it would fall in ruins about us." Its epicenter is believed to have been offshore, approximately 24 miles (39 km) east of Cape Ann. The quake was felt as far north as Halifax, Nova Scotia, south to the Chesapeake Bay and South Carolina, and from Lake George and Lake Champlain in the northwest to a ship 200 miles (320 km) off the east coast. Sailors on the ship reported that the quake was so strong, they had feared that they had run aground. The region experienced several aftershocks, the first of which was a little more than an hour after the quake. Most of these aftershocks could not be felt in Boston, affecting only the northeastern coast of the colony.

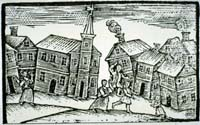
An 18th-century woodcut taken from a religious tract showing the effects of the Cape Ann earthquake

Modern research has estimated that the quake was between 6.0 and 6.3 on the Richter scale, and the United States Geological Survey lists it as the largest earthquake in the history of Massachusetts. Scientists are unclear on the causes of this and other quakes in the northeastern United States. There are a number of old faults in the region, but none of them are known to still be active. It is possible that the Cape Ann earthquake may have been remotely triggered by a larger earthquake in Lisbon, Portugal, a few weeks prior, although there is not enough evidence to prove that they are linked.

=== Damage ===
Boston and Cape Ann were the most heavily damaged. In Boston, damage was concentrated in areas of infill near the harbor; infill is less sturdy in earthquakes than solid land. From 1,300 to 1,600 chimneys in the city were damaged in some way, the gable ends of some houses collapsed, and a number of roofs were damaged by falling chimneys. Stone chimneys and buildings were damaged in Falmouth (present-day Portland, Maine), Springfield, Massachusetts, and New Haven, Connecticut, as well. Some church steeples in Boston were damaged, ending up tilted from vertical. Stone fencing in rural areas was damaged. Observers also reported that several springs dried up, new ones were created, and cracks appeared in the ground near Scituate, Lancaster, and Pembroke. In this last town, observers noted water and fine sand coming from the crack. Non-structural damage was minor; residents reported damage to china and glassware, and a distiller lost some of his product after a cistern was damaged.

=== Potential tsunami ===
The Cape Ann earthquake may also have created the first recorded tsunami in United States history. Observers in the Leeward Islands nearly 1,000 miles (1,600 km) south of Cape Ann, reported a receding of water followed by a large wave that lifted several boats ashore and left fish floundering on the beach.

== Legacy ==
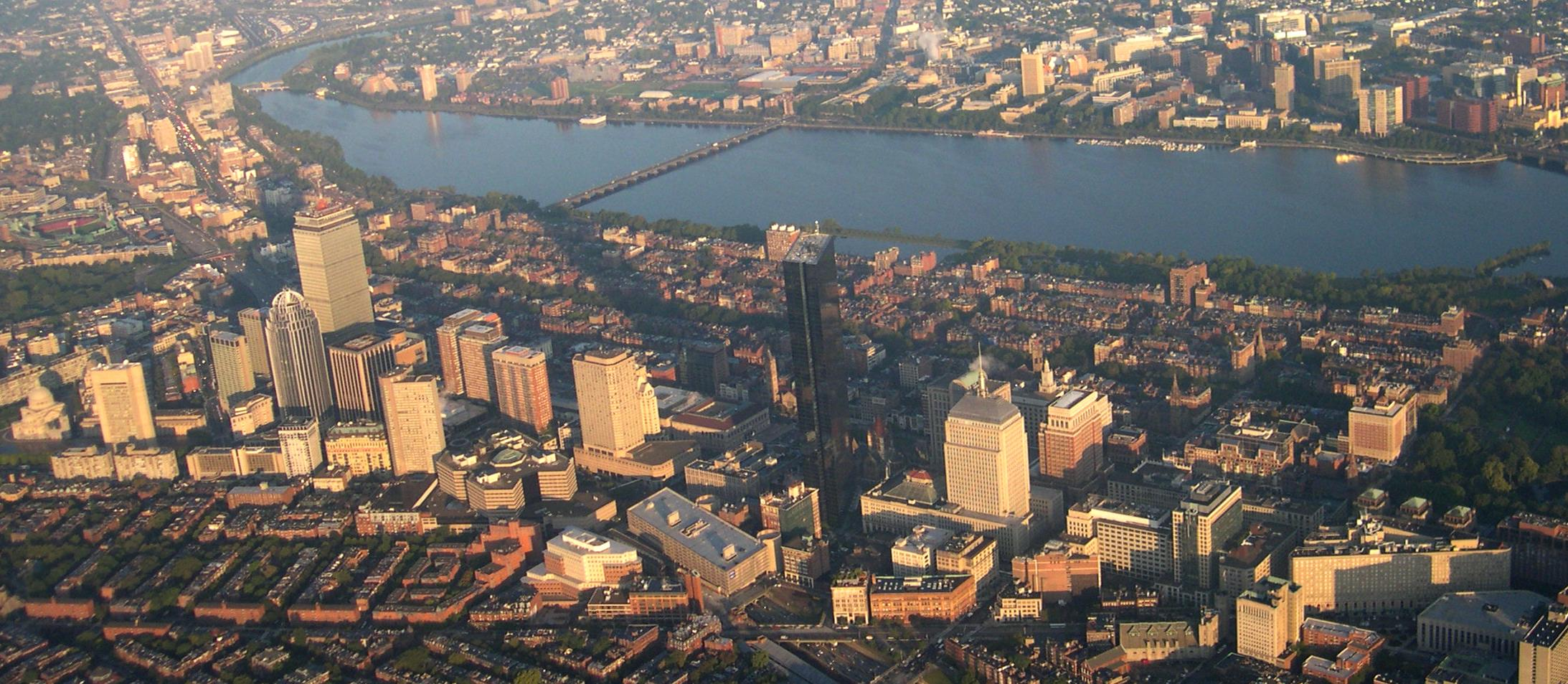
Boston's Back Bay (foreground) could suffer serious damage in a quake like 1755 Cape Ann earthquake.

Many Massachusetts residents of the time perceived the quake as punishment from God for immoral behavior. In the days after the earthquake, special prayer services were held and civic authorities declared fast days. A number of sermons and other writings were published as a consequence, including Jeremiah Newland's Verses Occasioned by the Earthquakes in the Month of November 1755 and Thomas Prince's Earthquakes the Works of God and Tokens of his Just Displeasure. Well before 1755, the new rational materialist ideas promulgated by Enlightenment scientists had begun to heavily influence the better-educated citizens of colonial America; therefore not all explanations of the event were theological. John Winthrop, a Harvard professor, proposed an alternate explanation having to do with heat and chemical vapors inside the surface of the earth. John Adams, in comments in the margins of Winthrop's Lecture on Earthquakes wrote:

I am not able to satisfy myself, whether the very general if not universal apprehension that Thunder, Earthquakes, Pestilence, Famine &c. are designed merely as Punishments of sins and Warnings to forsake, is natural to Mankind, or whether it was artfully propagated, or whether it was derived from Revelation. An Imagination that those Things are of no Use in Nature but to punish and alarm and arouse sinners, could not be derived from real Revelation, because it is far from being true, tho few Persons can be persuaded to think so.

Many of the buildings in modern Boston and its surroundings are built on infill, especially in the Back Bay area, which may be prone to greater shaking and to compaction of the sand and gravel used as fill. Many older buildings in the Boston area are masonry, and may collapse completely during a major earthquake. A 1990 study by the Massachusetts Emergency Management Agency estimated potential financial losses at between $4 billion and $5 billion, and potential loss of life in the hundreds. As a consequence, the state has updated building codes and zoning laws to require that new construction and additions in vulnerable areas be built to resist earthquakes.

== See also ==
- List of earthquakes in the United States
- List of historical earthquakes
