= 2021 Chignik earthquake =

7th largest earthquake in the US

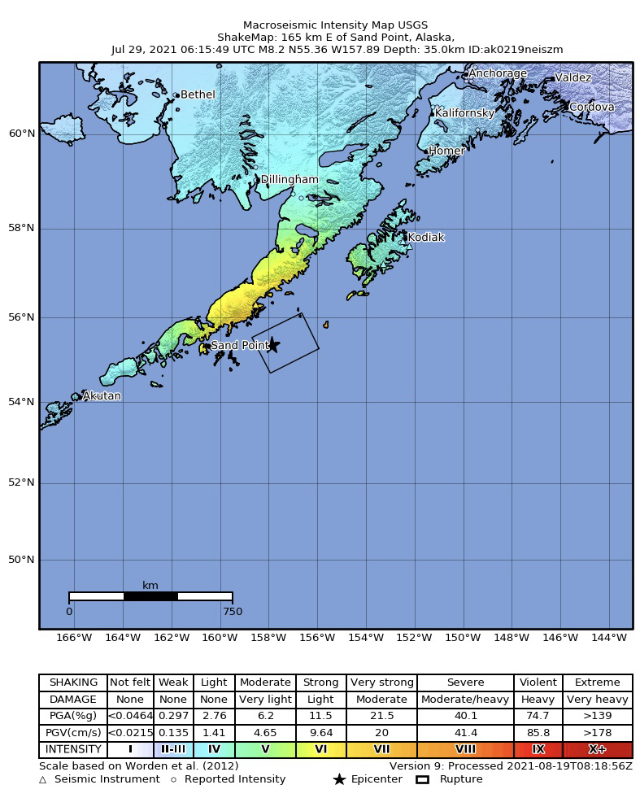
- USGS ShakeMap

- Location within Alaska
- UTC time: 2021-07-29 06:15:49
- ISC event: 620857937
- USGS-ANSS: ComCat
- Local date: July 28, 2021
- Local time: 22:15:49 AKDT (UTC-8)
- Magnitude: M_{w} 8.2–8.3
- Depth: 32.2 km (20.0 mi)
- Epicenter: 55.474°N 157.917°W
- Fault: Aleutian subduction zone
- Type: Megathrust
- Areas affected: Alaska
- Max. intensity: MMI VII (Very strong)
- Peak acceleration: 0.26 g
- Tsunami: 0.427 m (1.40 ft)
- Foreshocks: M_{w} 7.8 and 7.6 events in 2020
- Aftershocks: 1,345 ≥M_{w}2.0 (As of 22 January 2022); 87 ≥M_{w}4.0; Two 6.9 M_{w}events on 14 August and 11 October (Strongest)
- Casualties: None

An earthquake occurred off the coast of the Alaska Peninsula on July 28, 2021, at 10:15 p.m. local time. The large megathrust earthquake had a moment magnitude (M_{w}) of 8.2–8.3. A tsunami warning was issued by the National Oceanic and Atmospheric Administration (NOAA) but later cancelled. The mainshock was followed by a number of aftershocks, including three that were of magnitude 5.9, 6.9, and 6.9.

This was the largest earthquake in the United States since the 1965 Rat Islands earthquake, and the 7th largest earthquake in US history. It was also the strongest earthquake globally since the 2015 Illapel earthquake, tying the 2017 Chiapas earthquake and 2018 Fiji earthquake.

No casualties or serious damage were reported in the aftermath of the mainshock, as well as some of the strong aftershocks. In Perryville, the closest populated area to the quake, cracks appeared in drywall and on the ground. Some homes were also shifted. The limited impact from this earthquake was attributed to it occurring offshore from the sparsely populated Alaska Peninsula. A tsunami warning was rescinded, and no large waves were observed because the earthquake took place 32 km beneath the seafloor—deep enough that vertical uplift of the seafloor was limited.

== Tectonic setting ==
Off the coast of Alaska lies the Aleutian subduction zone, a 2,500-mile-long (4,000 km) convergent plate boundary where the Pacific plate subducts under the North American plate at a rate of 6–7 cm/year. This megathrust fault has been the source of many large earthquakes, including the 1964 Alaskan earthquake that registered a magnitude 9.2 and remains the second-largest earthquake in recorded history.

=== Background ===
South of the Alaska Peninsula is a segment of the Aleutian subduction zone known as the Shumagin segment, named after the nearby Shumagin Islands. This segment lies between the Unimak and Semidi segments, which had ruptured in earthquakes in 1946 and 1938 respectively. In 1971, the Shumagin segment drew the attention of seismologists, as it was proposed as a seismic gap because no major seismic activity have occurred there in recent times. The most recent events are thought to have occurred in 1788, which were a pair of large events, and in 1854. Two smaller earthquakes shook near the seismic gap in 1917 and 1948. That proposal also highlighted the potential for a tsunami accompanying an earthquake on the gap.

=== 1938 earthquake ===
The 1938 Semidi earthquake occurred on November 10 at 20:18 UTC. It had an estimated magnitude of 8.2 on the moment magnitude scale, and had an epicenter 40 km west of the epicenter of the 2021 earthquake. It was felt with a maximum Modified Mercalli intensity of VI (Strong), causing limited damage in the relatively unpopulated region of the Alaska Peninsula. While the earthquake generated an ocean-wide tsunami, the maximum measured wave height was only 0.3 meters. An unusually weak tsunami was generated because the earthquake occurred at a deep depth of 35 km.

The 1938 earthquake ruptured east of the Shumagin segment for a length of approximately 300 km. Rupture of this earthquake did not reach into the Shumagin segment.

== Foreshocks ==
In July 2020, the Aleutian Subduction Zone was the source of an M_{w} 7.8 earthquake that struck the same region south of the Alaska Peninsula. It was followed by another aftershock of M_{w} 7.6 in October the same year. The United States Geological Survey have since considered the two earthquakes as foreshocks to the M_{w} 8.2 event in 2021.

=== July 2020 ===
July 2020 foreshock event
- UTC time: 2020-07-22 06:12:44
- ISC event: 618688608
- USGS-ANSS: ComCat
- Local date: July 21, 2020
- Local time: 20:12:44
- Magnitude: M_{w} 7.8
- Depth: 28.0 km (17.4 mi)
- Epicenter: 55.072°N 158.596°W
- Fault: Aleutian subduction zone
- Type: Thrust
- Areas affected: United States
- Max. intensity: MMI VII (Very strong)
- Tsunami: 0.24 m (0.79 ft)
- Casualties: None

The M_{w} 7.8 earthquake on July 21, 2020, was the result of thrust faulting on the Aleutian subduction zone, where the Pacific plate subducts underneath the North American plate, forming the Aleutian Trench and Arc. This convergent boundary is one of the most active in the world, and was the location of the M_{w} 9.2 1964 Alaska earthquake, the largest recorded in North America and the second-largest in the world. On average, the rate at which these plates converge is about 6.4 cm/year. The earthquake struck east of the Shumagin Gap, a 125-mile-wide (201 km) seismic gap in the subduction zone which had not ruptured with a large quake for at least 100 years. Previously, it was thought that the subducting plate in the Shumagin Gap was poorly coupled to the overriding crust, quietly slipping and preventing large quakes. However, research suggests that the seismic gap, contrary to speculation that it might be a relatively "safe" seismic zone in the arc, may pose a threat similar to that of the rest of the Aleutian subduction zone. It was also the largest earthquake in 2020 by magnitude.

The earthquake ruptured an area of about 120 mi × 60 mi (193 km × 97 km), equal to about 7,200 sq mi (19,000 km^{2}). The estimated maximum slip along this fault surface was about 3 to 4 m (9.8 to 13.1 ft).

The earthquake appears to have only partially ruptured the Shumagin segment of the subduction zone, at 75%. Estimated fault rupture dimensions are a width of 140 km, and length of 250 km, with a depth ranging from 11 to 49 km along the subduction zone. The rupture of this earthquake did not propagate towards the shallow, near-trench section of the subduction zone. The lack of seismic activity on the shallow section may suggest that section is locked and accumulating elastic energy, raising the issue on the potential for tsunami earthquakes occurring.

No severe damage or injuries were reported in the aftermath of the earthquake. Mild damage occurred in Sand Point with reports of damaged docks and cracked roads and cement. It was reportedly felt as far as Vancouver and Victoria, more than 1,500 miles (2,400 km) away.

=== October 2020 ===
October 2020 foreshock event
- UTC time: 2020-10-19 20:54:38
- ISC event: 619498906
- USGS-ANSS: ComCat
- Local date: October 19, 2020
- Local time: 12:54:38
- Magnitude: M_{w} 7.6
- Depth: 28.4 km (17.6 mi)
- Epicenter: 54.602°N 159.626°W
- Areas affected: United States
- Max. intensity: MMI VII (Very strong)
- Tsunami: 0.76 m (2.5 ft)
- Casualties: None

This M_{w} 7.6 earthquake occurred along a north-northwest-striking strike-slip fault rather than the thrust mechanism seen in the July event. It did not occur along the megathrust boundary but within one of the two interacting plates. Maximum slip along the fault is estimated at 3.4 meters.

A tsunami warning was issued but was later downgraded to an advisory. A wave was measured at 2.3 ft (70.1 cm) at Sand Point. At King Cove, the tsunami had a wave height of 2.1 ft (64.0 cm) and was 2.5 ft (76.2 cm) at Chignik Bay. In the state of Hawaii, alert level Advisory was issued at 5:55 pm. Wave heights ranging between 0.1 and 1.2 ft (3.0 and 36.6 cm) were detected along the islands. The tsunami warning was later cancelled at 05:05:15 UTC.

The earthquake was described as "weird" and "the wrong type" by researchers at Pennsylvania State University, adding that the earthquake with its strike-slip mechanism "made no sense" because of its location near a subduction zone. The fault involved with the event is situated within the downgoing Pacific slab. It is likely a remnant of a fault structure formed at a distant mid-oceanic spreading ridge. This steeply-dipping, trench-perpendicular fault ruptured up the Pacific slab towards the trench for a length of 70 km and caused slip of up to 5 meters.

Observed by scientists was the larger tsunami triggered by the October quake. A possible cause of the larger tsunami was the occurrence of slip on the megathrust boundary as well. Further analysis found that both the strike-slip fault and megathrust rupture had a combined magnitude of M_{w} 8.0, but seismic signals from the megathrust rupture was undetected. The October 2020 megathrust rupture occurred at a depth shallower than that of the July 2020 event, but failed to rupture towards the seafloor.

== Earthquake ==
Occurring southeast of Perryville, Alaska (south of the Alaska Peninsula), the earthquake happened as the result of thrust faulting on or near the subduction zone interface between the Pacific and North America plates. The preliminary focal mechanism solution indicates that rupture occurred on a fault dipping either shallowly to the northwest, or steeply to the southeast. The location, mechanism and depth – and the large size of the event – are all consistent with slip occurring on the subduction zone interface between the two plates. At the location of this event, the Pacific plate converges with North America to the northwest at a rate of about 6.4 cm/year, subducting at the Alaska-Aleutians trench about 125 km to the southeast of the earthquake.

The earthquake was initially reported as having a preliminary magnitude of 7.3 before being upgraded to 8.2 by the United States Geological Survey (USGS), while the International Seismological Centre (ISC) and two USGS finite fault models estimate a magnitude of M_{w} 8.3.

The focal depth of the M_{w} 8.2 mainshock at 32.2 km suggests that it was deeper than the foreshocks. The mainshock ruptured an area of about 200 km × 100 km (124 mi × 62 mi), or 20,000 km^{2} (7,700 sq mi), with an estimated maximum slip of 5.5 m (18 ft). It is thought to have ruptured the same subduction-zone segment that was also involved in a similar-sized event in 1938.

It was the second of three earthquakes of magnitude 8 or higher in 2021. On March 4, 2021, nearly 5 months before the Alaska mainshock, an 8.1 magnitude earthquake struck the Kermadec Islands, a sparsely populated territory owned by New Zealand, and another equally sized event struck the Sub-Antarctic British territory of the South Sandwich Islands on August 12 of that year. This is unusual since earthquakes of magnitude 8 or higher occur only about once every year on average. There is no evidence of a causal relationship between the three events. 2021 had the most 8.0+ earthquakes in a single year since 2007.

== Tsunami ==
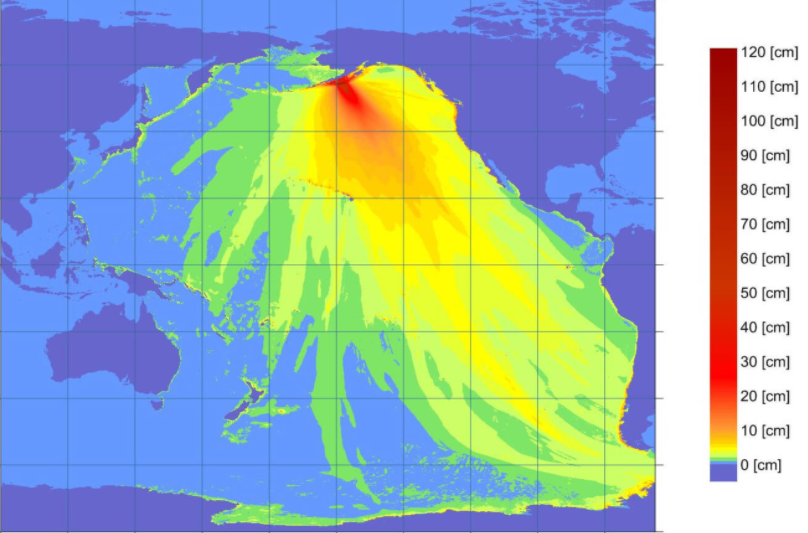
2021 Chignik earthquake Tsunami map

A tsunami warning was issued by the National Tsunami Warning Center about 5 minutes after the earthquake. 1 hour and 45 minutes after, the warning was downgraded to an advisory, and it was canceled 3 hours after the earthquake. A tsunami height of 1.4 feet (42.7 cm) was recorded in the city of Old Harbour in the Kodiak Island Borough on Kodiak Island. In Port San Luis (Avila Beach) on the Central Coast of California, a 1.3-foot (40 cm) tsunami surge was reported by the National Weather Service in a tweet.

Tsunami height observations
Location	Height	Source
Old Harbour, Kodiak Island Borough on Kodiak Island	1.4 feet (42.7 cm)	
Avila Beach, San Luis Obispo on San Luis Obispo County	1.3 feet (39.6 cm)	
Sand Point, Aleutians East Borough on Popof Island	0.5 feet (15.2 cm)	
Kodiak, Kodiak Island Borough on Kodiak Island	0.5 feet (15.2 cm)	
King Cove, Aleutians East Borough on Deer Island (Aleutian Islands)	0.4 feet (12.2 cm)	
Cape Alitak, southern Kodiak Island	0.4 feet (12.2 cm)	
Unalaska, Aleutians West Census Area on Unalaska Island	0.3 feet (9.14 cm)	

== See also ==
- List of earthquakes in 2021
- List of earthquakes in Alaska
- List of earthquakes in the United States
- List of megathrust earthquakes
