= List of earthquakes in Kansas =

Earthquakes in Kansas may refer to:

- 1867 Manhattan, Kansas earthquake
- Oklahoma earthquake swarms (2009–present), including earthquakes in southern Kansas
- 2014 Milan, Kansas earthquake
