= 1921 Sevier Valley earthquake =

Earthquake in Utah

1921 Richfield earthquake
- Location within Utah
- UTC time: 1921-09-29 14:12:00
- USGS-ANSS: ComCat
- Local date: 29 September 1921
- Local time: 07:12 a.m. MDT
- Magnitude: M_{w} 6.3
- Epicenter: 38.68°N 112.15°W
- Areas affected: Utah
- Max. intensity: MMI VIII (Severe)
- Landslides: multiple
- Aftershocks: >35
- Casualties: 2 injured

The 1921 Sevier Valley earthquake was a series of three earthquakes. The primary quake was a magnitude M_{w} 6.3 earthquake that occurred on Thursday, 29 September 1921 at approximately 7:12 AM MT in Elsinore, Utah, United States. The first aftershock occurred in the evening on the same day, and a second aftershock occurred two days later on 1 October. No people were killed in the quake or in the subsequent aftershocks.

== Earthquake ==
The primary earthquake struck on Thursday 29 September 1921 at approximately 7:12 AM MT in Elsinore, Utah, United States, lasting for 7–10 seconds. This quake was preceded by several weeks of smaller quakes. A major aftershock occurred on the same day at approximately 7:30 PM MT, and a second major aftershock occurred on Saturday, 1 October at approximately 8:32 AM MT.

=== Magnitude and intensity ===
The initial quake was a M_{w} 6.3 and an intensity of VIII ("Severe"). The official USGS report in their historical earthquakes list stated a magnitude of M_{w} 5.2 and an intensity of VIII ("Severe"). An official USGS report published in 1988 assigned the modified magnitude of M_{w} 6.3. It was felt in an area of between 2,500 square kilometers (970 sq mi) and 5,100 square kilometers (2,000 sq mi), which is considered a small area for a quake of this size. The farthest distance from the epicenter for the felt area was 25 miles (40 km). The quake lasted several seconds.

The first major aftershock was a M_{w} 5.7 and an intensity of VII ("Very Strong"). The epicenter was at the same location as the initial quake, and the felt area was similar. The second major aftershock was the same magnitude and intensity as the initial quake, was in the same location, and felt in a similarly sized area. This quake was reported as "quick and short as the detonation of a cannon". The quakes were felt as far north as Salina and as far south as Marysvale.

== Destruction ==
Damage to chimneys and brick walls from the initial quake was "considerable". Over US$100,000 in damage were caused (over US$1.44 million in 2020) by the primary quake.

The town of Elsinore, reported sunken foundations, damaged roofs from collapsing chimneys and brick walls, and brick, adobe, and stone buildings were significantly damaged. More than half of the residences in the town were seriously damaged, a dozen were damaged enough to be condemned, and most residences received some cracking and plaster damage. The newly built schoolhouse had walls collapse and a damaged roof, causing it to have to be rebuilt. Damage in Monroe included collapsed pipe trenches, cracked buildings, and the hot springs at the town turned "blood red" from iron oxide. Large boulders were dislodged and some landslides were reported in canyons near Monroe.

The first major aftershock—in the evening on the same day—did further damage to structures, especially those already affected by the primary quake. Structures in Monroe received significantly more damage from this aftershock. Damage was also reported in Richfield.

On 1 October, the second major aftershock destroyed many of the damaged buildings, including a paint store in Elsinore. It also caused new damage to undamaged buildings, and caused previously damaged buildings to be completely destroyed. More large boulders were dislodged and additional landslides were caused in various canyons near the affected towns. Monroe was especially hard hit, with almost all chimneys being destroyed and many buildings being damaged beyond repair. A man seated high on a bank of a river was thrown down to the edge of the river, the hot springs were discolored by iron oxide again, and the Monroe City Hall was "shattered".

No people were killed in the quake, though at least two were injured by falling bricks or plaster.
