= 1892 Vacaville–Winters earthquakes =

Damaging earthquake doublet in northern California

- UTC time: Doublet earthquake: A: 1892-04-19; B: 1892-04-21
- USGS-ANSS: A: ComCat; B: ComCat
- Local date: A: April 19, 1892 B: April 21, 1892
- Magnitude: A: 6.4 M; B: 6.2 M
- Epicenter: 38.4°N 122°W
- Type: Unknown
- Total damage: $225,000–250,000
- Max. intensity: MMI IX (Violent)
- Casualties: 1 dead

The 1892 Vacaville–Winters earthquakes occurred in northern California as a large doublet on April 19 and April 21. Measured on a seismic scale that is based on an isoseismal map or the event's felt area, the 6.4 M and 6.2 M events were assigned a maximum Mercalli intensity of IX (Violent), and affected the North Bay and Central Valley areas. The total damage was estimated to be between $225,000 and 250,000 and one person was killed. No evidence of fault movement on the surface of the ground was observed as a result of either of the strong shocks. Both occurred in the domain of the San Andreas strike-slip system of faults, but their focal mechanism is uncertain.

== Tectonic setting ==
The primary tectonic feature of the region is the strike-slip San Andreas system of faults (that move laterally alongside one another). From west to east, the Hayward–Rogers Creek Fault Zone and the Concord–Green Valley Faults are the closest to Vacaville and Winters. A 1999 forecast stated that the Hayward and Rogers Creek Faults have been given a 32% chance of a M6.7 or greater shock before 2030, and the Concord and Green Valley Faults have been assigned a lower probability of 6% each.

Vacaville and Winters both lie to the east of these faults along the low foothills. Numerous geoscientists have remarked on the potential for blind thrust earthquakes in this area. These professionals specifically labelled it the Coast Range–Sierran Block Boundary Zone in a sequence of published articles from the 1980s and 1990s and stated that the 1983 Coalinga earthquake (a blind thrust event) occurred within the zone.

== Earthquakes ==
Each large shock in the doublet, one on April 19 and the other two days later on April 21, had a high intensity and was felt over roughly the same geographical area. The area over which the initial shock was felt with an intensity of VIII (Severe) was about 1,100 km^{2} and the area for the second shock was about 890 km^{2}. The furthest extent that they were felt was from Redding in the north to Salinas and Fresno in the south and to Virginia City, Nevada in the east.

Investigators completed a study of the area that included a three dimensional crustal velocity model. Proprietary seismic reflection data were also inspected in an attempt to establish a source for the sequence. Observations of the range front and modelling of strong ground motions led to the presentation of a 17 km (11 mi) rupture on the west-dipping Gordon Valley blind thrust fault that could have produced the felt intensities that were specific to the April 19 event.

=== Damage ===
The shocks affected Solano and Yolo Counties along the border of the Sacramento Valley. In the north, the communities of Esparto and Capay both experienced Mercalli intensities of VIII (Severe)—which is associated with damage—and in the south, Vacaville and Fairfield both experienced the same. Work by seismologist Toussan Toppozada, that was published in a 1981 report, further clarified that Vacaville was at the center of the destruction. Damage also occurred at Dixon as well as the area of the highest reported intensity of IX (Violent), midway between Winters and Vacaville, at Allendale. There, some buildings were damaged, some collapsed, and 1.6 km (1 mi) long ground fissures were observed.

These widespread and north-trending cracks were very narrow, from 2.5–7.6 centimeters (1–3 in) in width. Despite these surface cracks and other offset drainages and other lineaments, no surface faulting occurred. This was confirmed by trench excavations where these features were found. Other ground effects occurred though. Reports of rockslides and dislodged boulders were written about in the newspapers, but the most common type of damage were the many chimneys that were damaged or destroyed. Total damage was estimated between $225,000 and $250,000, and one person was reported dead.

=== Intensity ===
An isoseismal map for the April 19 event shows an asymmetrical and slightly elongated pattern of isoseismal lines (of equal intensity) on the north–south axis. There are high intensities east of the Napa–Solano county border. No locations in Napa county reached any higher than intensity VI (Strong), indicating that the shock originated east of the Vaca Mountains. The April 21 event differed slightly, in that the strongest effects were shifted slightly to the northwest.

== See also ==
- List of earthquakes in California
- List of earthquakes in the United States
- List of historical earthquakes
