= 1948 Desert Hot Springs earthquake =

Earthquake in California

- UTC time: 1948-12-04 23:43:19
- ISC event: 897665
- USGS-ANSS: ComCat
- Local date: December 4, 1948; 77 years ago
- Local time: 15:43:19 PST
- Magnitude: 6.4 M_{w}
- Depth: 10 km (6.2 mi)
- Epicenter: 33.77°N 116.62°W
- Type: Strike-slip
- Areas affected: Coachella Valley; Southern California; United States
- Max. intensity: MMI VII (Very strong)
- Landslides: Yes (Indio Hills)
- Casualties: Several injured

The 1948 Desert Hot Springs earthquake occurred on December 4 at 3:43 p.m. Pacific Standard Time with a moment magnitude of 6.4 and a maximum Mercalli intensity of VII (Very strong). The shock was felt from the central coast of California in the north, and to Baja California in the south, and came at a time when earthquake research in southern California resumed following the Second World War. It was one of two events in the 20th century that have occurred near a complex region of the southern San Andreas Fault system where it traverses the San Gorgonio Pass and the northern Coachella Valley. Damage was not severe, but some serious injuries occurred, and aftershocks continued until 1957.

== Preface ==
The United States' involvement in World War II brought about a lapse in earthquake research in California, due to scientists and other technicians being assigned defense-related work, and the ongoing process of using earthquake records to establish their epicenters eventually came to end. The Seismological Society of America cancelled their annual meetings and their Bulletin was reduced to half its normal size. Following the war, work resumed at the Caltech and Berkeley labs detecting local earthquakes to determine the location of active faults. By 1948, seismologist Charles Richter had determined that areas where small earthquakes were occurring did not necessarily mean that a stronger shock would take place at the same location in the future.

== Tectonic setting ==
The San Gorgonio Pass is one of the largest irregularities of the San Andreas Fault system, where it branches into a group of discontinuous faults. The convoluted nature of fault strands make estimating the source characteristics of future events in that area challenging. Simultaneous rupture of multiple fault strands can produce exceptionally complex earthquakes, like the 1992 Landers earthquake, which was the result of sequential rupture of multiple strike-slip faults.

The San Andreas Fault system is similarly complex as it moves through the San Gorgonio Pass, with associated oblique/reverse faults that are actively uplifting San Gorgonio Mountain, the tallest peak in southern California. The 1986 North Palm Springs earthquake occurred to the west of the 1948 shock, and produced 9 kilometers (5.6 mi) of surface rupture on the Garnet Hill Fault or the Coachella strand of the Banning Fault. Together, these are the only historical shocks to occur on the portion of the San Andreas Fault System that lies south of the Cajon Pass.

== Earthquake ==
The mainshock was recorded by few seismometers in the region. In contrast, the 1986 event occurred at a time when far more instruments were operating in southern California, and the additional volume of data that was generated provided a means for relocating and confirming the mechanism of faulting for the older event. The amplitude of the waveforms shown on the 1948 seismograms were 20–30% larger than those of the later shock. Like the 1986 event, the 1948 event was presumed to have occurred near the northwest-striking (and steeply-dipping) Banning Fault, which was relatively unknown at the time.

A lack of surface ruptures from this predominantly strike-slip event is one element that contributed to preventing researchers from identifying the causative fault. The presence of shattered ground (very loose topsoil that appeared to have been "loosened by a shaking table") indicated to researchers that it probably originated in the hanging wall block between the Banning and Mission Creek Faults.

Selected Mercalli intensities
MMI	Locations
MMI VII (Very strong)	Desert Hot Springs, CA; Palm Springs, CA
MMI VI (Strong)	Los Angeles, CA; San Diego, CA
MMI V (Moderate)	Arvin, CA; Barstow, CA
MMI IV (Light)	El Centro, CA; Yuma, AZ
MMI III (Weak)	Goodsprings, NV; Bakersfield, CA
Earthquake Intensity Database, National Geophysical Data Center

=== Intensity ===
The isoseismal map for this event is somewhat symmetrical, but with a significant east–west elongation that is aligned with the Transverse Ranges. The Mercalli intensity peaked at VII (Very strong) in the area around Desert Hot Springs. Intensity VI (Strong) effects were observed in Los Angeles, where damage was slight and several hundred automatic gas shutoff valves were tripped, especially in Monterey Park (just to the east of Los Angeles). At roughly the same distance from the epicenter, San Diego had more intense effects than El Centro did. Intensity VI was felt in San Diego, while El Centro was marked as I–IV (Not Felt–Light). This was likely due to a difference in local geological features, and the attenuation factor along the path to each area, sometimes called "earthquake shadows".

=== Damage ===
The shock was felt as far north as Santa Maria and south into northern Baja California, and was described by seismologists as having been stronger than the 1933 Long Beach earthquake that heavily affected southern California, but no one was killed and only relatively minor damage occurred. A few injuries, some serious, occurred at the Palm Springs Theater during the rush to evacuate the building, and another man was injured by falling merchandise and required hospitalization. In Downtown Los Angeles, buildings swayed, windows were broken, and cracks appeared in buildings. Similar types of damage was also present in Twentynine Palms, El Centro, and Yucca Valley.

=== Aftershocks ===
A late 1950s study of the event included details on aftershocks that were greater than 3.0 M_{L}. In this range, there were 18 aftershocks on the first day (including eight within the first hour) and 12 the following day. These events continued to occur every day for nearly a week, at which time they began tapering off and became less of a daily occurrence. By late December, there were one per day or less, with 60 events through the remainder of the year. In 1949 there were far less, with 16 events altogether. The last event that was mentioned in the study occurred in January 1957.

== See also ==
- List of earthquakes in 1948
- List of earthquakes in California
- List of earthquakes in the United States
