= 1927 Lompoc earthquake =

Earthquake in California

- Location within California
- UTC time: 1927-11-04 13:51:03
- ISC event: 909604
- USGS-ANSS: ComCat
- Local date: November 4, 1927
- Local time: 05:51 PST
- Magnitude: M_{w} 7.0
- Depth: 10.0 km (6.2 mi)
- Epicenter: 34.68°N 120.705°W (Note: See Earthquake section on the discussion of earthquake epicenter)
- Areas affected: Southern California
- Max. intensity: MMI IX (Violent)
- Tsunami: 2 m (6 ft 7 in)
- Casualties: None

The 1927 Lompoc earthquake occurred on November 4 at 05:51 PST with an epicenter off the coast of Santa Barbara County in Southern California, United States. The earthquake measured 7.0 on the moment magnitude scale and had a maximum Modified Mercalli intensity of IX (Violent). There is debate among seismologists on whether the earthquake was caused by movement on the Hosgri Fault and its mechanism of faulting. The earthquake caused widespread damage in several towns of Santa Barbara County. A 2 m (6 ft 7 in) tsunami damaged railroad infrastructure and was recorded in Hawaii. There were no injuries or deaths from the earthquake.

== Earthquake ==
The earthquake occurred on November 4 at 05:51 PST, and the United States Geological Survey placed its epicenter off the coast of Santa Barbara County and its moment magnitude at 7.3. Due to the sparse instrumental data, the mechanism of the earthquake remains a source of debate among seismologists. In 1930, Perry Byerly suggested an epicenter location about 80 km (50 mi) west of Point Arguello based on studying the P and S wave signals on seismographs. This calculation places the epicenter along the Santa Lucia Bank Fault System, which also generated two thrust earthquakes in 1969. This thrust fault runs along the continental margin for more than 100 km (62 mi) and exhibits significant vertical seabed offsets. The epicenter has also been relocated by Harold Jeffreys, Keith Bullen, (Note: 34.9°N 120.7°W) and the International Seismological Centre. (Note: 34.9°N 121.0°W) (Note: As of 2022, the International Seismological Centre relocated the epicenter to 34.68°N 120.705°W)

In 1978, William Gawthrop proposed that the earthquake's epicenter was located immediately west of Point Sal, (Note: 34.9°N 120.7°W) along the Hosgri Fault, based on an analysis of P-waves obtained from various seismological observatories. Gawthrop also analyzed the available tsunami reports, which supported the idea of the seabed being displaced near the coast, and the results of an earlier triangulation survey that happened to be done in the area of greatest shaking. It revealed potential ground deformation and he considered that it may also be evidence of rupture along a coast-parallel thrust fault, but also acknowledged that it did not rule out other possibilities. The epicenter location near the Hosgri Fault trace suggest this northwest-trending dextral oblique-reverse fault may have produced the earthquake. However, the vertical component in the earthquake is larger than could be accounted for by the Hosgri Fault alone.

The next year, Thomas Hanks argued against a possible Hosgri Fault rupture, and relocated the epicenter 40 km (25 mi) from Gawthrop's. (Note: 34.6°N 120.9°W) Hanks reported the analysis of teleseismic waves from the earthquake suggest a rupture on either a dextral strike-slip fault oriented slightly north or sinistral strike-slip fault oriented east–west, while also producing considerable vertical displacement. Another possible mechanism involves thrust faulting along a fault striking approximately northwards. As the Hosgri Fault lies about 10 km (6.2 mi) from the coast between Point Arguello and Point Buchon, the general lack of strong shaking in this region near the fault suggest a source further offshore. Furthermore, Hanks interpreted that the Hosgri Fault was a sinistral strike-slip fault which contradicts the mechanism of the earthquake.

Seismologists Kenji Satake and Paul G. Somerville determined the earthquake's epicenter to be further offshore (Note: 34.2°N 120.75°W) based on their analysis of the tsunami arrival times, and estimated the moment magnitude (M_{w}) at 7.0. The tsunami magnitude (M_{t}) of 7.6 derived by Katsuyuki Abe from tsunami observations in Hawaii was deemed an overestimate by the pair.

== Impact ==
=== Shaking ===
Along the coast near Surf, the maximum Modified Mercalli intensity was assigned IX (Violent), and may have reached X (Extreme). Intensity VI (Strong) or greater was felt up to distances of 193.1 km (120.0 mi) from the epicenter, (Note: Referencing Byerly's coordinates) or approximately 100,000 km^{2} (39,000 sq mi). Shaking was felt as far as Yosemite, more than 402.3 km (250.0 mi) away. The southeastern and northernmost point of perceptibility were at Whittier and Morgan Hill.

=== Tsunami ===
The tsunami was the largest locally generated along the west coast of the United States. It was recorded along the coasts of California and Hawaii. In Surf, the tsunami reached 2 m (6 ft 7 in), while at Port San Luis, the sea receded by 2 m (6 ft 7 in) before rising. In Los Angeles, an unusual but non-destructive high tide was observed one hour after the earthquake. Railroad workers at Surf and Pismo described the tsunami as a "large storm wave" and there was no drawback of the ocean when the first wave approached. A railway worker in Port San Luis said the sea level fluctuated for an hour by 1.5 m (4 ft 11 in); similar observations were made by a lighthouse keeper nearby. Tide gauges in Fort Point and La Jolla recorded the tsunami, where they appeared as amplitudes of 1.9 cm (0.75 in) and 3.8 cm (1.5 in), respectively, with a period of roughly 15 minutes. The tsunami was also recorded in Hawaii's Hilo and Honolulu. It is the only recorded earthquake in California that is known to have generated a tsunami that was detectable in Hawaii.

=== Damage ===
The Lompoc Record reported that every home in Lompoc was damaged to some degree. In stores, merchandise was knocked onto the floor, while in homes, many dishes and porcelain crashed to the ground. A branch of the Trust and Savings Bank sustained damage to its cornice, and operations were suspended until 09:00 PST to remove debris on the sidepath. A Bank of Italy branch also sustained cracks and detached plaster. Store windows at several properties cracked or shattered. Shortly after, many residents rushed to the business district to survey the damage. Among them was a driver who was injured in a crash while rushing along West Ocean Avenue.

Properties in the areas north and west of Lompoc sustained the worst damage from the earthquake. Multiple towns, such as Arroyo Grande, Los Berros, Guadalupe, Halcyon, Lompoc, Los Alamos, and Nipomo reported that chimneys were destroyed. At least 10 sand boils were observed at Roberd's ranch, and the ranch house was displaced on its base by 5 cm (2.0 in). One building in White Hills suffered from collapsed walls. The town of Santa Maria and its surrounding reported cracks in old brick walls, detached cornices and damage to chimneys. In Surf, cracks appeared in a concrete highway and a bridge of the Southern Pacific Railroad was displaced near its center. There were also minor landslides in the area. Seismic shaking was reported on the S.S. Socony and Alaska Standard, located 43.5 km (27.0 mi) and 25.7 km (16.0 mi) from Point Arguello, respectively. The captain of the S.S. Floridian reported dead fish floating several miles from the town at 11:00 PST. The tsunami swept away a section of railroad at Surf, displacing it by many yards, and flooded a railway station.

== See also ==
- 1812 Ventura earthquake
- List of earthquakes in California
- List of historical earthquakes
