= 1980 Livermore earthquake =

Earthquake in San Francisco Bay Area, California

- UTC time: 1980-01-24 18:00
- ISC event: 653190
- USGS-ANSS: ComCat
- Local date: January 24, 1980; 46 years ago
- Local time: 11:00 PST
- Magnitude: 5.8 M_{w}
- Depth: 10 km (6.2 mi)
- Epicenter: 37.743°N 121.825°W
- Fault: Greenville Fault
- Type: Strike-slip
- Areas affected: East Bay; Northern California; United States
- Total damage: $11.5 million
- Max. intensity: MMI VII (Very strong)
- Casualties: 44 injured

The 1980 Livermore earthquake occurred on January 24 at 11:00 PST in California. The epicenter of the 5.8 M_{w} earthquake was a hilly area 12 km (7.5 mi) southeast of Mount Diablo and north of Livermore Valley. The earthquake had a maximum Modified Mercalli intensity of VII (Very strong). Forty four people were injured and damage across the San Francisco Bay Area totaled $11.5 million, with the majority inflicted at the Lawrence Livermore National Laboratory.

== Earthquake ==
The mainshock was preceded by a 2.7 M_{L} foreshock 1.5 minutes prior. In the first six days after the mainshock, 59 aftershocks were recorded measuring ≥ 2.5 M_{L}. On January 26, a M_{w} 5.3 aftershock occurred with an epicenter 14 km (8.7 mi) southeast of the mainshock. Six hundred aftershocks were recorded in the 33 days after the mainshock. An analysis of P wave indicate the fault plane solution was right-lateral strike-slip faulting.

=== Faulting ===
Northwest-trending surface faulting consisting of discontinued and small offsets occurred along the Greenville and Las Positas faults. At least 4.2 km (2.6 mi) of rupture occurred on the Greenville Fault, but it may have extended south to Interstate Highway 580, giving a possible total length of 6.2 km (3.9 mi). However, for most of the measured Greenville Fault surface rupture length, it was mainly was gaps of absent faulting. A maximum right-lateral offset of 25 mm (0.98 in) and vertical offset of 50 mm (2.0 in) was measured by United States Geological Survey scientists who added that these figures included an unspecified amount of aseismic slip and gravity effects. The surface rupture trace aligned well with a strand of the Greenville Fault previously mapped in 1977.

A secondary rupture of 0.5 km (0.31 mi) rupture was located 0.12–0.25 km (0.075–0.155 mi) east of the main rupture. This subsidiary rupture was about 25 m (82 ft) away from another fault mapped in the 1977 survey. The break produced 20 cm (7.9 in) of right-lateral offset and 40 mm (1.6 in) of extension. Another rupture located 0.3 km (0.19 mi) southwest of the main zone produced predominantly extensional features with a minor right-lateral element. This rupture occurred 80 to 100 m (260 to 330 ft) from the mapped Greenville Fault strand. Offset was also recorded along a zone that aligned with mapped portions of the Las Positas Fault. These were on Vasco and Tesla roads which featured 0.5 mm (0.020 in) and 1.5 mm (0.059 in) of left-lateral displacements, respectively. Based on interpreting the location of these ruptures, the inferred rupture length on the Las Positas Fault was at least 1.1 km (0.68 mi).

=== Damage ===
The earthquake injured 44 people and caused predominantly nonstructural property damage. Most of the damage were fallen ceiling tiles, detached bricks from chimneys, ruptured gas and water lines, shattered windows, and mobile homes displaced shifted off foundations. At a ranch north of Livermore, along Vasco Road, two masonry fireplaces were fractured and offset from their walls. Along Interstate 580 and Greenville Road, a concrete pavement sunk 30 cm (12 in), and the a concrete abutment fractured and spalled.

Damage at Lawrence Livermore National Laboratory facilities was estimated at $3 million with another $12 million estimated for repairs, mostly to building interiors. Many unsecured bookshelves toppled, denting walls or shattering glass. Ceiling tiles and light fixtures fell while broken pipes caused water damage in some places. Structural damage was heaviest where the concrete floors joined their supporting columns. Some reinforced concrete walls at the facility showed hairline to 0.25 in (6.4 mm)-wide cracks. Cases of spalling concrete and exposed reinforcement were rare. Connections between tilt up concrete walls and their steel frameworks exhibited strain, indicated by stretched or loose bolts, and several sheared stud-welded bolts. There was also 1.0–1.5 in (25–38 mm) of displacement between the walls and steel frames.

The January 26 aftershock caused six injuries in Livermore due to shattered glass and falling debris. Fifty homes sustained minor damage in Tassajara. A fireplace was damaged, walls and concrete fractured, walls detached from ceilings, windows broke and a chimney collapsed. In Danville, a brick chimney and fireplace were damaged, stone wall was destroyed, and walls, patios, sidewalks and ceilings cracked. Several other towns reported slight damage.

== See also ==
- List of earthquakes in 1980
- List of earthquakes in California
