= 1986 Chalfant Valley earthquake =

Earthquake

- UTC time: 1986-07-21 14:42:28
- ISC event: 491308
- USGS-ANSS: ComCat
- Local date: July 21, 1986; 40 years ago
- Local time: 07:42:28 PDT
- Magnitude: 6.2 M_{w}
- Depth: 10 km (6.2 mi)
- Epicenter: 37.54°N 118.42°W
- Type: Strike-slip
- Areas affected: Eastern California; United States
- Total damage: US$2.7 million
- Max. intensity: MMI VI (Strong)
- Peak acceleration: 0.46 g
- Foreshocks: 5.7 M_{L} July 20 at 14:29
- Casualties: 2 injured

The 1986 Chalfant Valley earthquake struck southern Mono County near Bishop and Chalfant, California at 07:42:28 Pacific Daylight Time on July 21. With a moment magnitude of 6.2 and a maximum Mercalli intensity of VI (Strong), the shock injured two people and caused property damage estimated at $2.7 million in the affected areas. There was a significant foreshock and aftershock sequence that included a few moderate events, and was the last in a series of three earthquakes that affected southern California and the northern Owens Valley in July 1986.

Strong motion stations at the Long Valley Dam and an instrumented building in Bishop captured light to moderate readings from the event. The faulting reached the surface of the ground, but the maximum amount of measurable slip was limited to about 11 centimeters (4.3 in) of strike-slip motion along the White Mountain Fault Zone. Other destructive and surface-rupturing earthquakes, as well as large volume volcanic eruptions, have occurred in the area. Although the series of shocks occurred within the White Mountain seismic gap, the region continues to have potential for a very large earthquake.

== Preface ==
July 1986 was an unusually active month for moderate to strong earthquakes in California, with three events occurring in less than two weeks, each with mild to moderate effects. The first of these shocks came on July 8 with a M6.0 event on the Banning fault near Palm Springs and the second event occurred off the coast of Oceanside as a M5.8 shock on July 13. While the earthquake off the southern California coast occurred in an area thought to be capable of generating a tsunami, the earthquake near Palm Springs occurred on a portion of the southern San Andreas Fault system that has been designated a seismic gap, and is a likely location for a very large earthquake. The same seismic gap theory (regarding the potential for a future large earthquake) had also been presented for the White Mountains area near Chalfant.

== Tectonic setting ==
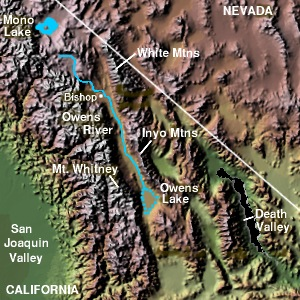
The Owens Valley region

The Owens Valley, located at the western boundary of the Basin and Range Province, is confined by the Sierra Nevada mountain range to the west and the White-Inyo Mountains to the east. The valley was brought about by active tectonics over the last 2–4 million years, and was the scene of a very large earthquake in 1872 that generated surface rupture from Lone Pine in the south to as far north as Big Pine, a distance of approximately 100 kilometers (62 mi). Other large, surface rupturing events in 1915, 1932, and 1954 delineate the Eastern California–Central Nevada seismic zone.

As no large earthquake has occurred between the southern extent of the 1932 Cedar Mountains (Nevada) earthquake's rupture and the northern extent of the 1872 Lone Pine earthquake's rupture in the south (a distance of 130 km (81 mi)), the zone has been labeled the White Mountain seismic gap. The 1934 M6.3 Excelsior Mountains earthquake and the 1986 Chalfant Valley event were several smaller earthquakes that have occurred within the gap, and both generated limited surface faulting and some surface cracking in the Volcanic Tableland, which was created .7 million years ago from a major volcanic eruption that also formed the Long Valley Caldera northwest of Bishop. An estimated 500 cubic kilometers of material (tephra) produced in the event covers the northern Owens Valley as a rocky landform. The surface of the layered plateau is known as Bishop Tuff and features fumarole mounds and hundreds of north–south oriented fault scarps, many of which are visible on topographic maps, via aerial photography, and satellite imagery.

== Foreshocks ==
The University of Nevada, Reno (UNR) and the United States Geological Survey (USGS) both operated seismograph networks in the region where the Chalfant Valley earthquake sequence occurred. The data that was captured was transmitted in real time to Reno, Nevada and Menlo Park, California and was digitized for later examination. The foreshock activity was found to have begun eighteen days prior to the main event on July 3, with the onset of a 3.5 event (local magnitude). Activity increased on July 18 with several doublets then reduced again in the hours prior to the primary M5.7 (intensity V (Moderate)) foreshock on July 20. All forty events that were recorded by the UNR and USGS stations before that event were within 2 km (1.2 mi) of its epicenter, and another 132 events that were considered aftershocks were documented in the remaining 24 hours leading up to the mainshock. One of these events, just over two hours after the primary foreshock, measured M4.7 with an intensity of IV (Light).

== Earthquake ==
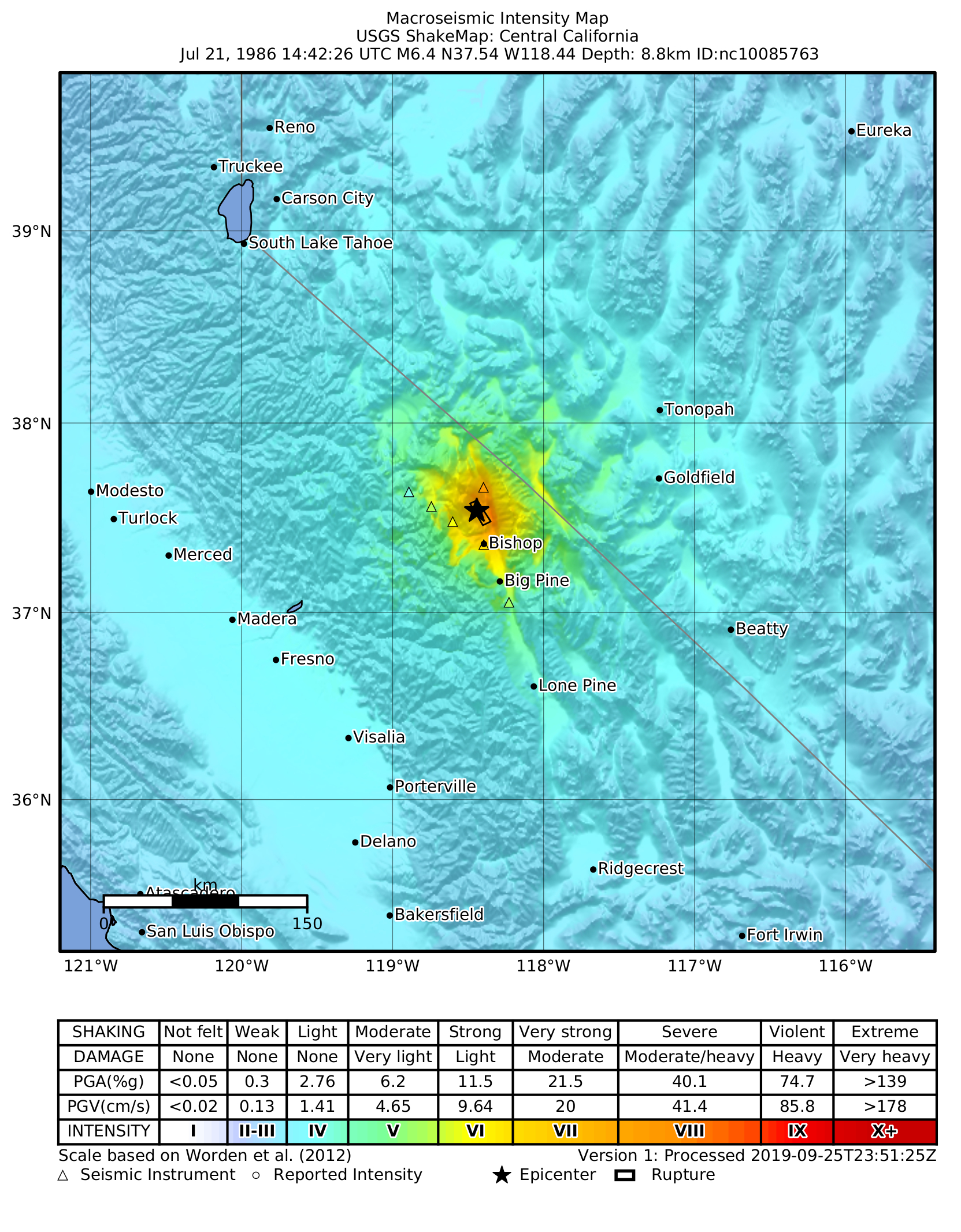
USGS ShakeMap for the event

The mainshock occurred at 07:42:26 on July 21 and caused the most damage in the sequence of events. The shock measured 6.2 M_{w} as measured by the International Seismological Centre and originated at a depth of approximately 10.8 kilometers (6.7 mi). The focal mechanisms of the three largest events (the July 20 foreshock, the mainshock, and the largest aftershock) were primarily strike-slip with a minor amount of normal-slip and were especially well-constrained due to the dense array of seismometers in the area that were operated by the UNR and the USGS. The primary foreshock's preferred fault plane solution indicated left-lateral slip on a fault striking N25°E, but neither the mainshock nor the largest aftershock conformed with their right-lateral slip striking N25°W and N15°W respectively.

=== Damage ===
In Bishop, windows were shattered and ceiling tiles fell in several buildings, and a portion of the brick façade at the First Sierra bank building fell onto the sidewalk. A Burger King had part of its ceiling come down. Northwest of Bishop, a portion of U.S. Route 395 was temporarily blocked by a landslide. Campers were briefly trapped at the Pleasant Valley Reservoir when a 150 ft (46 m) section of an access road was destroyed as a result of land movement. Both injuries that were reported (minor cuts and injuries from falling objects) occurred to the north in Chalfant Valley where 53 mobile homes were knocked off their foundations and two homes were destroyed. Nearly all the buildings in that small town were affected, with water and sewer lines broken there as well.

Many of the mobile homes were able to be remounted on their foundations, but 18–20 of the homes were unable to be repaired. The overall damage from the event was compared with the other events in southern California. While the Oceanside shock caused $200,000 in damage, the Palm Springs event caused an estimated $8 million in damage. Damage in from the Chalfant Valley event was estimated at $2.7 million.

=== Surface faulting ===
Ground fractures that were deemed to be tectonic in nature were documented on about 10.5 kilometers (6.5 mi) of the White Mountain Fault Zone from Silver Creek to Piute Creek. The cracks trended 350° and a maximum right-lateral slip of about 11 centimeters (4.3 in) was measured, though other vertical (downslope) or extensional movement was also seen, especially on the 150 m (500 ft)-thick surface of the Bishop Tuff in the Volcanic Tableland. There, the largest displacements were seen in the vicinity of Casa Diablo Mountain. The cracks were found primarily in loose sand, which made measurements difficult.

=== Intensity ===
Main shock Mercalli intensities
MMI	Locations
MMI VI (Strong)	Bishop, Chalfant
MMI V (Moderate)	Coalinga, Death Valley
MMI IV (Light)	Fallon, Sacramento
MMI III (Weak)	Santa Cruz, Las Vegas, Oceanside
Stover & Brewer 1994, pp. 47–50

In Bishop, intensity VI effects included broken windows and cracked walls in commercial and government buildings. Items fell from store shelves at grocery markets, streets were cracked, and wells had changes in the flow of water. The damage to the mobile homes in Chalfant was also consistent with intensity VI shaking, with some of the homes moving laterally as much as 18 inches. Also in this classification was damage to pipe supports along a portion of the Los Angeles Aqueduct between the Upper, Middle, and Control Gorge Power Plants southeast of Crowley Lake. Intensity V (Moderate) effects (including cracked windows and broken underground pipes) were present in the Central Valley, Death Valley, and Carson City, Nevada.

=== Strong motion ===
The foreshock, mainshock, and the two largest aftershocks were recorded by strong motion stations that were operated by the California Strong Motion Instrumentation Program (CSMIP) and the USGS. A total of 36 seismograms were captured from 11 stations, including a two-story steel frame building, the Long Valley Dam, and several free field stations. The Chalfant strong motion station recorded the largest horizontal accelerations for the foreshock, mainshock, and the July 21 M5.6 aftershock of 0.28 g, 0.46 g, and 0.17 g. The instruments at the building on North Main street in Bishop recorded all four shocks and indicated 0.25 g at ground level and 0.4 g on the roof, both during the mainshock. The station at the earthen Long Valley Dam had produced many quality recordings since being put into operation in 1979 and saw mainshock accelerations of 0.09 g on bedrock, and 0.24 g on an upper abutment.

== Aftershocks ==
The day of the main event two aftershocks occurred (5.6 at 14:51 and 5.4 at 22:07) but the initial shock was V (Moderate) on the Mercalli intensity scale and the second event was felt only. Ten days following the mainshock on July 31, a stronger aftershock occurred with a local magnitude of 5.8 and a maximum Mercalli intensity of VI (Strong). That aftershock was felt in California and western Nevada, broke windows and knocked items off shelves in Bishop, and light fixtures were damaged at the National Weather Service office.

== See also ==
- List of earthquakes in California
- List of earthquakes in the United States
