= 1992 Joshua Tree earthquake =

- UTC time: 1992-04-23 04:50:25
- ISC event: 296868
- USGS-ANSS: ComCat
- Local date: April 22, 1992; 34 years ago
- Local time: 9:50:25 p.m. PDT
- Magnitude: 6.2 M_{w}
- Depth: 9.7 km (6.0 mi)
- Epicenter: 33.91°N 116.49°W
- Fault: Eureka Peak Fault
- Type: Strike-slip
- Areas affected: Inland Empire; Southern California; United States
- Total damage: Moderate
- Max. intensity: MMI VII (Very strong)
- Peak acceleration: 0.36 g
- Foreshocks: 4.6 M_{L}
- Aftershocks: >6000
- Casualties: 32 injured

The 1992 Joshua Tree earthquake occurred at 9:50:25 p.m. PDT (04:50:25 UTC) on April 22 in Southern California. The magnitude 6.2 earthquake struck under the Little San Bernardino Mountains, near the town of Joshua Tree, California. Though no deaths were reported, the earthquake caused 32 injuries. A maximum Mercalli intensity of VII (Very Strong) was observed in Joshua Tree and caused light to moderate damage. The event preceded the Landers and Big Bear earthquakes by two months but is now recognized as the beginning of a series of major earthquakes that culminated in two events on June 28, 1992.

== Earthquake ==
The Joshua Tree mainshock struck at 9:50:25 p.m. It was caused by north-northwest-trending, right-lateral strike-slip faulting on the Eureka Peak fault which is at least 15 km (9.3 mi) long and possibly handles a significant portion of the slip transferred from the San Andreas Fault zone. Its epicenter was centered about 100 mi (160 km) east of Downtown Los Angeles and about 9.7 km (6.0 mi) deep. The shaking was reportedly felt as far away as San Diego, Santa Barbara, California, Las Vegas, Yuma, Arizona, and Phoenix, Arizona. Approximately two months later, the strongest earthquake in 40 years since the 1952 Kern County earthquake hit Southern California and caused 92 million dollars in damage.

The magnitude 6.2 earthquake that occurred in Joshua Tree, California, on April 22, 1992, was a previously unmapped north-facing earthquake located about 20 km south of the Mount Pinto fault and about 10 km northeast of the mission and a maximum fault slip of 0.8 m (2 ft 7 in) was estimated. It was attributed to the right fault along the Late Quaternary Fault. The Creek is a tributary of the San Andreas Fault system. The proximity of the epicenter to the Coachella Valley segment, a particularly dangerous part of the San Andreas fault, immediately raised concerns that it could be a precursor to a larger earthquake. This prompted the California Department of Emergency Services to issue a warning of possible future activity in the local counties shortly after the earthquake.

=== Impact ===
Although this earthquake did not have surface faulting that was observed, the rupture propagated northward 12 miles (19 km) to the town of Joshua Tree, where it caused damage. It caused minor damage to several bridges and minor architectural damage to public school buildings. A supermarket was damaged. 32 people were injured by the quake. Of the 170 public school facilities in the earthquake's geographic area, 10 had minor structural damage, ranging from cracks in plaster to hairline cracks in masonry walls. 48 bridges were inspected after the earthquake, and 13 showed signs of movement, nine of which were slightly damaged. None of the bridges suffered damage severe enough to affect its traffic.

In some areas, it was felt for at least 60 seconds. It temporarily shut down at least one television station, but Downtown Los Angeles electrical service was not affected. The quake rattled Southern California, temporarily disrupting phone service from east of Riverside to the Arizona border. At the Hyatt Regency Suites in Palm Springs, chief security officer Jerry Iovine reported that guests on the top floor had been temporarily evacuated while construction experts examined the structure of the six-story hotel. The Governor's Office of Emergency Services issued advisories to six counties telling officials in Riverside, San Bernardino, Imperial, Los Angeles, Orange, and San Diego counties that they should be on alert for another, larger quake.

=== Aftershocks ===
The earthquake had more than 6,000 aftershocks, the largest with a magnitude of 4.8. A foreshock of magnitude 4.6 occurred about two hours before the main quake. The aftershocks spread along a northward trend from about 10 km (6.2 mi) north of the San Andreas Fault northwest of Indio, California to the east-striking Mount Pinto Fault and it also preceded the Landers event near the southern end of the future Landers aftershock zones. The aftershock sequence of the Joshua Tree quake also showed a clear relative calm during the period before the Landers rupture.

== See also ==
- List of earthquakes in 1992
- List of earthquakes in California
- List of earthquakes in the United States
- 1992 Landers earthquake
- 1992 Big Bear earthquake
