= 1838 San Andreas earthquake =

Magnitude 7 earthquake in California

- USGS-ANSS: ComCat
- Local date: June 1838
- Magnitude: 6.8–7.2 M_{w}
- Epicenter: 37.30°N 122.15°W (approximate)
- Fault: San Andreas Fault
- Type: Strike-slip
- Areas affected: Alta California; Mexico
- Max. intensity: MMI VIII (Severe)
- Casualties: Unknown

The 1838 San Andreas earthquake is believed to be a rupture along the northern part of the San Andreas Fault in June 1838. It affected approximately 100 km (62 miles) of the fault, from the San Francisco Peninsula to the Santa Cruz Mountains. It was a strong earthquake, with an estimated moment magnitude of 6.8 to 7.2, making it one of the largest known earthquakes in California. The region was lightly populated at the time, although structural damage was reported in San Francisco, Oakland, and Monterey. It is unknown whether there were fatalities. Based on geological sampling, the fault created approximately 1.5 meters (5.0 feet) of slip.

For years, another large earthquake was said to have occurred two years earlier on June 10, 1836, along the Hayward fault; however, this is now believed to be referring to the 1838 San Andreas earthquake. There is no evidence that a large earthquake hit the region in 1836.

== Preface ==
During the 1830s in California, the largest of the few settlements usually contained no more than several hundred individuals. This is true even for the area between the San Francisco Peninsula and south to the Santa Clara Valley. Native Americans kept no records and communications between the villages was poor. There were no local newspapers and no correspondents from news agencies in the distant United States. Beginning in 1833, the secularization of the Spanish missions brought an end to the once plentiful and dominant source of information in the study of previous earthquakes, and other Mexican sources during this period were also lacking. The California Gold Rush ushered in a host of changes, including the startup of newspapers in the Sierra Nevada and the San Francisco Bay Area. These records were tapped later on by seismologists in their study of earthquakes in the area.

The lack of archives made work difficult for seismologists preparing earthquake catalogs or those involved in creating seismic hazard and risk estimates. The science of seismology was still many decades in the future and no measuring equipment existed to aid in the recording and documentation of earthquakes. Had there been equipment available to use in the study, there were still no scientists in the area to perform the work. Instruments capable of detecting earthquakes that were designed by John Milne became available by 1896, but it was not until the Wood-Anderson seismograph was developed in 1926 that instruments began to be used in widespread fashion in California. Details that made their way into the earthquake catalogs showed that the period 1836–1840 was one of the most active on record.

The history of earthquakes along the northern part of the SAF relies on paleoseismic investigations before about 1776, when the first missions were founded in this part of California. A series of earlier events have been identified, the most recent of which occurred in the time interval 1660–1780 with an estimated rupture length of greater than 250 km and apparently affected the Offshore, North Coast and Peninsular sections of the fault. Since 1776 possible events on the fault include earthquakes in 1836, 1838, 1839, 1865, 1890 and 1906. The 1836 event is no longer thought to have been a large earthquake and it remains uncertain which fault was ruptured. The 1839 event is now accepted as misreporting of the 1838 earthquake. The 1865 event is only known to have affected the Santa Cruz Mountains, but is interpreted to be a reverse fault type earthquake not on the SAF itself. The 1890 earthquake is thought to be a result of rupture along the Santa Cruz Mountains section, with an estimated magnitude in the range M_{w} 6.0–6.3. There has been no large earthquake on the northern part of the SAF since 1906. The 1989 Loma Prieta earthquake was another reverse fault type event.

== Tectonic setting ==
The San Andreas Fault (SAF) system is a network of active right-lateral strike-slip faults that form a portion of a complex and diffuse transform type plate boundary. The zone of deformation between the Pacific and North American plates extends east into the Basin and Range Province of Eastern California and western Nevada. The faults span on and off shore along the California portion of the Pacific Rim, and near San Diego they are about 150 kilometers (93 mi) wide. In the area near San Francisco Bay, the extent of the various fault strands are limited to about 80 kilometers (50 mi). This system of faults terminates in the north at the Mendocino triple junction where the north-northwest trending SAF meets the east trending Mendocino fracture zone and the Cascadia subduction zone. It terminates in the south in a more gradual fashion at the Salton Sea where displacement transitions to a series of transform faults and spreading centers along the Gulf of California Rift Zone.

The northern part of the SAF consists of four main sections between the northern end of the central part (the San Juan Bautista section) and the Menocino triple junction. These are known as the Santa Cruz Mountains (or Loma Prieta), Peninsula, North Coast and Offshore sections, going from south to north. All these sections ruptured during the 1906 earthquake.

== Earthquake ==
Due to the paucity of contemporary observations of this earthquake, there is significant uncertainty about the time and date, the magnitude, the maximum intensity and the exact portion of the fault that ruptured.

The date is not known precisely, other than that the earthquake occurred in late June 1838 and that the time was shortly after midday.

The magnitude has been estimated from the size of the affected area, the maximum intensity and the rupture length/displacement. This gives a magnitude range of 6.8–7.5. The maximum estimated intensity is at least VII–VIII (very strong to severe) on the Modified Mercalli intensity scale, based on contemporary reports of damage to mission buildings in Santa Clara, San Francisco and San Jose, although it may have reached IX (violent).

The description of the earthquake at Woodside, coupled with the report of a probable surface rupture in the same area suggests that some, if not all, of the Peninsula section ruptured. This is further supported by the interpretation of a paleoseismic investigation at Filoli, north of Woodside. The degree of shaking at Monterey, which is interpreted to be similar to that in the 1906 earthquake, has been used to support rupture along part, if not all, of the Santa Cruz Mountains section of the fault. The maximum suggested rupture length is 140 km, assuming that both sections of the fault ruptured completely. The possibility of rupture extending into the Santa Cruz Mountains has been investigated by paleoseismic techniques, particularly trenching across the fault at a series of localities, Grizzly Flat, Hazel Dell, Mill Canyon and Arano Flat. Initial results from Grizzly Flat found no evidence for the 1838 event, but the dating of the horizons have been re-evaluated and rupture associated with the 1838 earthquake is now thought to be consistent with observations at all four sites, suggesting a minimum rupture length on this section of the fault as 14 km.

The displacement during the 1838 earthquake has been estimated at three of the Santa Cruz Mountain paleoseismic sites and at Filoli, covering 83 km of the rupture length. The values are; Filoli 1.6±0.7 m, Hazel Dell 1.5 m, Mill Canyon 1.0 m and Arano Flat 1.0 m. Assuming a total rupture length of 100 km, this gives a magnitude range of M_{w} 6.8–7.2. The likely rupture extent has also been estimated by looking at stress transfer following the 1838 event. This analysis is more consistent with a rupture of 75 km in terms of subsequent earthquakes on the Santa Cruz Mountains section in 1865 and 1989.

=== Damage ===
The damage associated with this earthquake is quite poorly documented, relying on relatively few written accounts and most of these were only recorded well after the event. Effects were reported from as far north as the northern end of the San Francisco Peninsula and as far as Monterey in the south. On the peninsula, the walls of some buildings in the Presidio were cracked and the walls of the Mission San Francisco Dolores were badly damaged. Across the other side of the bay, large fissures were reported at "Oakland valley" (near the waterfront at Oakland). An adobe house was destroyed at San Leandro and a large landslide was seen in the nearby hills. The walls of the mission buildings at both San José and Santa Clara were badly affected and a house collapsed in San Jose town. At Woodside adobe buildings were badly cracked and there are reports of the "ground (moving) in waves like the ocean". An open fissure was also described to extend from near Lone Mountain to the Santa Clara mission. Many trees were uprooted and thrown sideways, something that was also observed during the 1906 earthquake. At Santa Cruz reports shortly after the earthquake of buildings in disrepair may be a result of the earthquake and at Monterey some adobe walls were damaged and crockery and glassware broken.

The age of major rockfalls in the Sierra Nevada that are thought to be seismically triggered have been investigated using lichenometry. Four main groups of ages were identified as 1817, 1837, 1857 and 1909, all with an uncertainty of 10 years and presumed to be associated with the major San Andreas earthquakes of 1812, 1838, 1857 and 1906. Rockfalls dated as 1837 were found to be equally as abundant as those dated 1857 and 1909, suggesting that the effects on the Sierra Nevada range was similar for all three events.

=== Aftershocks ===
A contemporary account mentions many aftershocks, continuing for at least 2 1/2 months until the writer left the area. Some larger aftershocks in 1840 and 1841 have also been attributed to the 1838 earthquake with magnitudes of about M 6 and epicenters near San Juan Bautista, supporting an extension of the 1838 rupture into the Santa Cruz Mountains.

== See also ==
- List of earthquakes in California
- List of earthquakes in the United States
- List of historical earthquakes
