= Hector Mine =

Abandoned clay mine in Hector, California, USA

Coordinates: 34°45′05″N 116°25′39″W

Hector Mine or The Hector is a mine in the Mojave Desert in San Bernardino County, California, about 8 miles southwest of Cady Peak. An occurrence of hectorite in the region gave the mineral its name and the 1999 Hector Mine earthquake, whose epicenter was close to The Hector, was also named after the mine. The mining camp and railroad complex, 4 miles north of the mine and now a tiny hamlet, was named Hector and Hector Road was named after it.

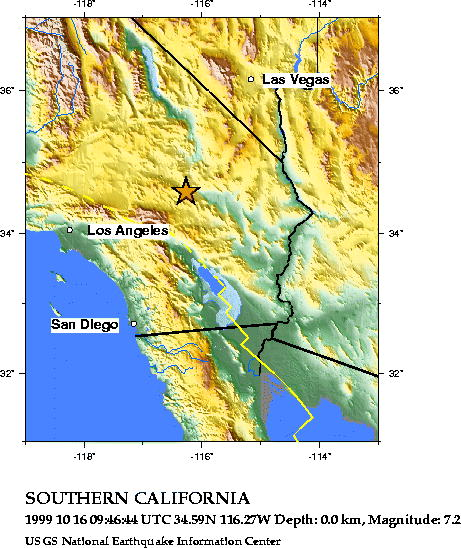
Map showing the epicenter of the 1999 Hector Mine earthquake and thus the location of the Hector Mine in California.

== History ==
=== 20th Century ===
From 1931 to 1934, bentonite prospectors Oscar Hoerner, Emery Hoerner, and company staked out the Hector area, and from 1937 to 1938, the property changed hands a few times. In 1941 the Inerto Company bought some of the area, and in 1944 the National Lead Mining Company, which had acquired most of the northern parts of the area, bought more of the Hector property from the F.S. Schundler Eyrite Company.

By 1948, RHEOX Incorporated, formerly NLC, had significantly depleted the ore on its land. RHEOX Inc. sold the minerals it produced to Aquagel paint manufacturers, while the Inerto Company's product was used to create Tansul, a beer and ale clarifier.

In 1961, the Hector Mine was flooded when water entered a ventilation shaft. Water could not be extracted from the mine, and the Inerto Company had to sell their side of the ore body. RHEOX Incorporated, now National Lead Company again, had just begun an open pit mine and could still supply its customers.

=== Present Day ===
In modern years, Hector Mine is mostly a silver, lead, and zinc mine.

== Geology ==
The Hector was primarily a clay mine but other mineral commodities exploited in the region include colemanite, lithium, lead, zeolites, and gypsum. Many other minerals are also located in the region.

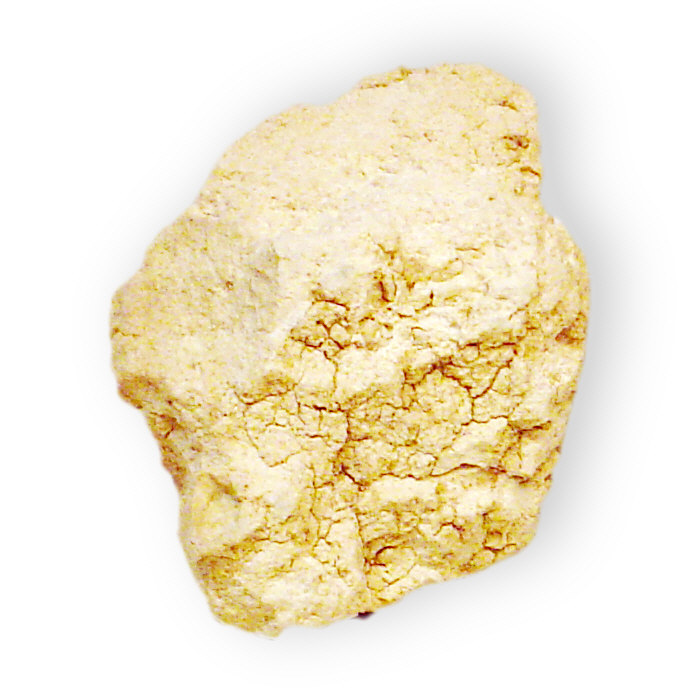
Hectorite Hydrous magnesium iron silicate Hector, California

== Climate ==
Hector, the nearby hamlet and former mining camp, is classified as a cold desert under the Köppen climate classification.

== Sources ==
- Richard, Willette (1995). "Geology of the Hector Mine Deposit". In Tabillo, M.; Dupras, D.L. (eds.). 29th Forum on the Geology of Industrial Minerals: Proceedings. Special Pub. 110. Calif. Dept. of Conservation, Div. of Mines and Geology. pp. 189–194.
- "Hector, San Bernardino County, California, USA" mindat.org
- "Hector Mine, San Bernardino County, California, United States" mindat.org
