= Chalfant, California =

- Census-designated place
- Location of Chalfant in Mono County, California.

- Location in California Chalfant (the United States)
- Coordinates: 37°30′38″N 118°22′30″W
- Country: United States
- State: California
- County: Mono

Area
  - Total: 28.07 sq mi (72.69 km^{2})
  - Land: 28.04 sq mi (72.62 km^{2})
  - Water: 0.027 sq mi (0.07 km^{2}) 0.10%
- Elevation: 4,282 ft (1,305 m)

Population (2020)
  - Total: 660
  - Density: 23.5/sq mi (9.09/km^{2})
- Time zone: UTC-8 (Pacific Time Zone)
  - Summer (DST): UTC-7 (PDT)
- ZIP code: 93514
- Area codes: 442/760
- GNIS feature IDs: 2582973

Chalfant (also Chalfant Valley) is an unincorporated community and census-designated place (CDP) in Mono County, California, United States. It is located on the abandoned Southern Pacific Railroad, 22 miles (35 km) south-southeast of Benton, at an elevation of 4,258 feet (1,298 m). The population was 660 at the 2020 census.

Chalfant is a small, primarily residential community located on U.S. Route 6, 14 miles (23 km) north of the city of Bishop. Most residents commute to Bishop for work and school.

The Chalfant post office operated from 1913 to 1928. The ZIP Code is 93514. The community is served by area codes 442 and 760.

== History ==
The town was named after William Arthur "Willie" Chalfant, who moved to the area in 1885 with his family, where they started The Inyo Register newspaper. Chalfant was the editor for 55 years.

A 6.2 earthquake occurred on July 21, 1986, in the Bishop and Chalfant area, and injured two people, causing damages estimated at $2.7 million. There was a foreshock before the initial quake, and an aftershock occurred ten days after the initial temblor. Smaller aftershocks occurred through September 30, 1986.

== Geography ==
Chalfant is in southeastern Mono County, lying in the Chalfant Valley at the western base of the White Mountains. The valley drains south to the Owens Valley in Inyo County.

According to the United States Census Bureau, the Chalfant CDP covers an area of 28.1 square miles (73 km^{2}), 99.90% of it land and 0.10% of it water.

== Demographics ==
Historical population
Census	Pop.	Note	%±
2010	651		—
2020	660		1.4%
U.S. Decennial Census; 2000 2010

=== 2020 census ===
As of the 2020 census, Chalfant had a population of 660. The population density was 23.5 inhabitants per square mile (9.1/km^{2}). All residents lived in rural areas.

The age distribution was 130 people (19.7%) under the age of 18, 26 people (3.9%) aged 18 to 24, 114 people (17.3%) aged 25 to 44, 217 people (32.9%) aged 45 to 64, and 173 people (26.2%) who were 65 years of age or older. The median age was 52.6 years. For every 100 females, there were 100.6 males; for every 100 females age 18 and over, there were 93.4 males age 18 and over.

There were 268 households, of which 51 (19.0%) had children under the age of 18 living in them. Of all households, 140 (52.2%) were married-couple households, 4 (1.5%) were cohabiting couple households, 71 (26.5%) had a male householder with no partner present, and 53 (19.8%) had a female householder with no partner present. About 90 (33.6%) of all households were made up of individuals and 54 (20.1%) had someone living alone who was 65 years of age or older. The average household size was 2.46. There were 165 families (61.6% of all households).

There were 313 housing units at an average density of 11.2 units per square mile (4.3 units/km^{2}), of which 268 (85.6%) were occupied. The homeowner vacancy rate was 0.4% and the rental vacancy rate was 8.0%. Of occupied units, 222 (82.8%) were owner-occupied and 46 (17.2%) were renter-occupied.

Racial composition as of the 2020 census
Race	Number	Percent
White	552	83.6%
Black or African American	2	0.3%
American Indian and Alaska Native	23	3.5%
Asian	4	0.6%
Native Hawaiian and Other Pacific Islander	1	0.2%
Some other race	21	3.2%
Two or more races	57	8.6%
Hispanic or Latino (of any race)	55	8.3%

=== 2010 census ===
Chalfant first appeared as a census designated place in the 2010 U.S. census.

== Government ==
In the California State Legislature, Chalfant is in the 4th senatorial district, represented by Republican Marie Alvarado-Gil, and in the 8th Assembly district, represented by Republican David Tangipa.

In the United States House of Representatives, Chalfant is in California's 3rd congressional district, represented by Independent Kevin Kiley.

== Education ==
Chalfant is served by the Eastern Sierra Unified School District for grades PK-12.
