= 1986 North Palm Springs earthquake =

Earthquake in Southern California

- UTC time: 1986-07-08 09:20:44
- ISC event: 490261
- USGS-ANSS: ComCat
- Local date: July 8, 1986; 40 years ago
- Local time: 02:20:44 PDT
- Magnitude: 6.0 M_{w}
- Depth: 10 km (6.2 mi)
- Epicenter: 34.02°N 116.76°W
- Type: Strike-slip
- Areas affected: Inland Empire; Southern California; United States
- Total damage: $4.5–6 million
- Max. intensity: MMI VII (Very strong)
- Peak acceleration: 0.778 g
- Casualties: 29–40 injured

The 1986 North Palm Springs earthquake occurred on July 8 at 02:20:44 local time with a moment magnitude of 6.0 and a maximum Mercalli Intensity of VII (Very strong). The shock occurred in a complex setting along the San Andreas Fault Zone where it bisects San Gorgonio Mountain and San Jacinto Peak at the San Gorgonio Pass and was the first in a series of three earthquakes that affected southern California and the northern Owens Valley in July 1986. Numerous strong motion instruments recorded the event, one of which showed relatively high accelerations. Between 29 and 40 people were injured, and financial losses were estimated to be in the range of $4.5–6 million.

== Preface ==
July 1986 was an unusually active month for moderate to strong earthquakes in California, with three events occurring in less than two weeks. Each had mild to moderate effects and began on July 8 with the event near Palm Springs. The second event was a M_{s} 5.8 shock that occurred off the coast of Oceanside on July 13. While the earthquake off the southern California coast occurred in an area thought to be capable of generating a tsunami, the earthquake near Palm Springs occurred on a portion of the southern San Andreas Fault system that has been designated a seismic gap and is a likely location for a very large future earthquake. The Chalfant Valley earthquake occurred on July 21 along the White Mountains Fault Zone near Bishop.

== Tectonic setting ==
The San Andreas Fault (SAF) spans nearly the length of California, where much it is clearly identifiable for much of its length, especially from San Francisco to near Cajon Pass. There, the fault splays into several branches. Several unusual characteristics are displayed further to the southeast in the area of the San Gorgonio Pass. There are no lateral stream offsets (that are associated with strike-slip faulting) near the pass like there are along other segments (one researcher indicated that thrust faulting was the dominant type of fault displacement at the pass). There are no great earthquakes that are known to have occurred at the pass, where the main trace of the SAF is marked by numerous sag ponds and north-facing scarps. The Banning Fault lies about two miles to the south of these features.

== Earthquake ==
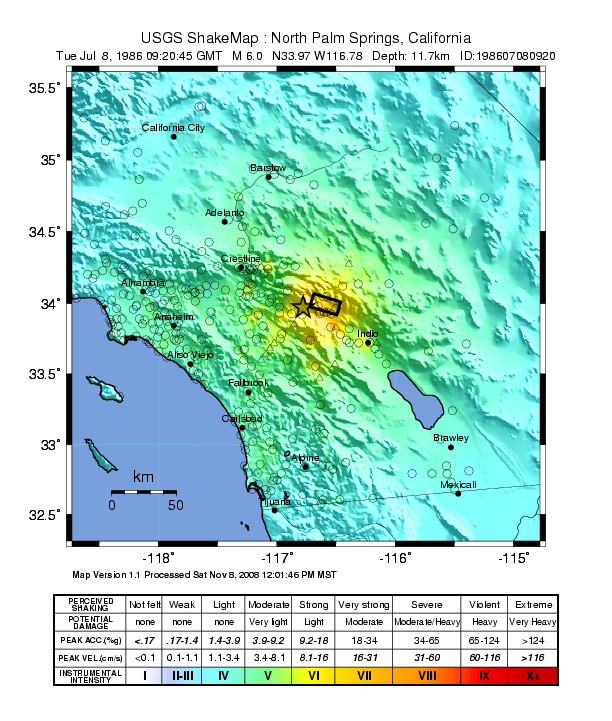
Strong ground motion map for the event

Early research indicated that the Banning Fault comprises three segments and that the nearly-parallel Garnet Hill Fault lies just to the south. The epicenter of the July 8 earthquake was located in this convoluted area of faults between two segments of the Banning Fault and the Mission Creek strand of the San Andreas Fault, about 16 miles (25 km) northwest of where these two faults converge to form the Coachella Valley segment of the SAF. The focal mechanism (as defined by first motions) showed pure right-lateral strike-slip on a fault trending west-northwest that dipped to the north at 45°. As many of the aftershocks and previous events in the area showed oblique-reverse motion, researchers did not exclude the possibility that the rupture started as horizontal motion, then transitioned into movement that included some vertical motion.

=== Damage ===
In North Palm Springs, four homes and 16 businesses were destroyed, and an additional 100 mobile homes and 100 businesses were damaged. In Whitewater Canyon, chimneys fell and three homes were destroyed; ceramic columns were broken and a transformer was displaced at the Devers electrical substation. The Windy Point Bridge was displaced on I-10 northwest of Palm Springs, causing a separation of the deck and abutment.

Other temporary roadway closures included State Route 111, which was closed until the following evening, and State Route 74 and State Route 243 that were reopened later in the day. State Route 62, which crosses the Banning and Mission Creek faults, was not immediately reopened due to buckled pavement. The California Aqueduct was damaged at several locations and water had to be diverted into a lake bed, and up to 80,000 people lost power for a portion of the day. Two fires in Riverside County caused serious damage, including a glass company that sustained $45,000 in damage, and several other brush fires.

=== Strong motion ===
The shock was captured by strong motion stations that were operated by the United States Geological Survey, California Division of Mines and Geology, University of Southern California and Kinemetrics Inc., a private company. Altogether, the networks comprised about 75 stations, mainly including ground response stations, but also included 17 buildings, nine dams, a power plant, and a freeway interchange. The stations were triggered at distances of up to 110 miles (180 km), with a strong motion duration of greater than three seconds at five of the closest stations. The strongest acceleration (0.778 g) occurred at the North Palm Springs Post Office on the vertical axis.

=== Intensity ===
The maximum intensity for the event was VII (Very strong). At Desert Hot Springs, effects aligned with this rating were broken underground pipes (including a 5-inch water main) and filing cabinets that were knocked over at city hall. At the Devers substation near North Palm Springs, 75 percent of the ceramic lightning arrestors and circuit breakers were damaged, and a 650,000 lb. transformer was dislocated 10 inches. A building collapsed at a drug and alcohol recovery facility and the White Water overpass was damaged due to lateral movement at its south abutment in Palm Springs. Broken glass and cracks in walls and concrete columns (some severe) were also widespread there.

Intensity VI (Strong) effects were widespread, from La Jolla and Pacific Beach area near San Diego to Seal Beach in the Los Angeles area that were deemed to qualify. The effects at this level included cracked walls and windows and small landslides, and were more prevalent in the Banning Pass and Palm Springs Area areas. The area of perceptibility for the mainshock was large (130,500 km^{2}), from Malibu and Ridgecrest in California, to Bullhead City and Yuma in Arizona, and Las Vegas in southern Nevada.

== See also ==
- List of earthquakes in 1986
- List of earthquakes in California
