= List of earthquakes in California =

Map of notable earthquakes in California since 1900– (map data)

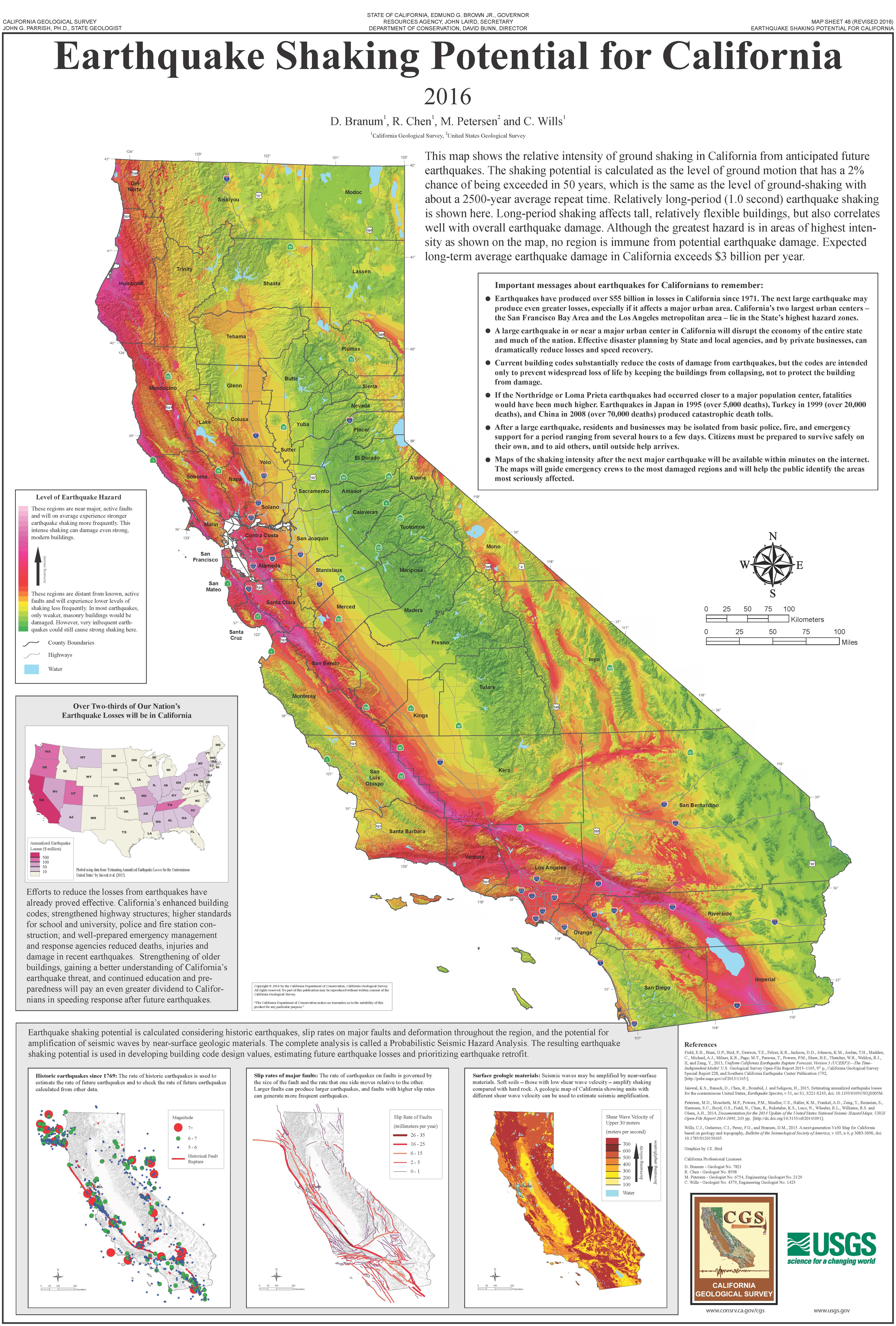
Probabilistic seismic hazard map

The earliest known earthquake in the U.S. state of California was documented in 1769 by the Spanish explorers and Catholic missionaries of the Portolá expedition as they traveled northward from San Diego along the Santa Ana River near the present site of Los Angeles. Ship captains and other explorers also documented earthquakes. As Spanish missions were constructed beginning in the late 18th century, earthquake records were kept. After the missions were secularized in 1834, records were sparse until the California gold rush in the 1840s. From 1850 to 2004, there was about one potentially damaging event per year on average, though many of these did not cause serious consequences or loss of life.

Since the three damaging earthquakes that occurred in the American Midwest and the United States East Coast (1755 Cape Ann, 1811–1812 New Madrid, 1886 Charleston) were well known, it became apparent to settlers that the earthquake hazard was different in California. While the 1812 San Juan Capistrano, 1857 Fort Tejon, and 1872 Owens Valley shocks were in mostly unpopulated areas and only moderately destructive, the 1868 Hayward event affected the thriving financial hub of the San Francisco Bay Area, with damage from Santa Rosa in the north to Santa Cruz in the south. By this time, scientists were well aware of the threat, but seismology was still in its infancy. Following destructive earthquakes in the late 19th and early 20th centuries, real estate developers, press, and boosters minimized and downplayed the risk of earthquakes out of fear that the ongoing economic boom would be negatively affected.

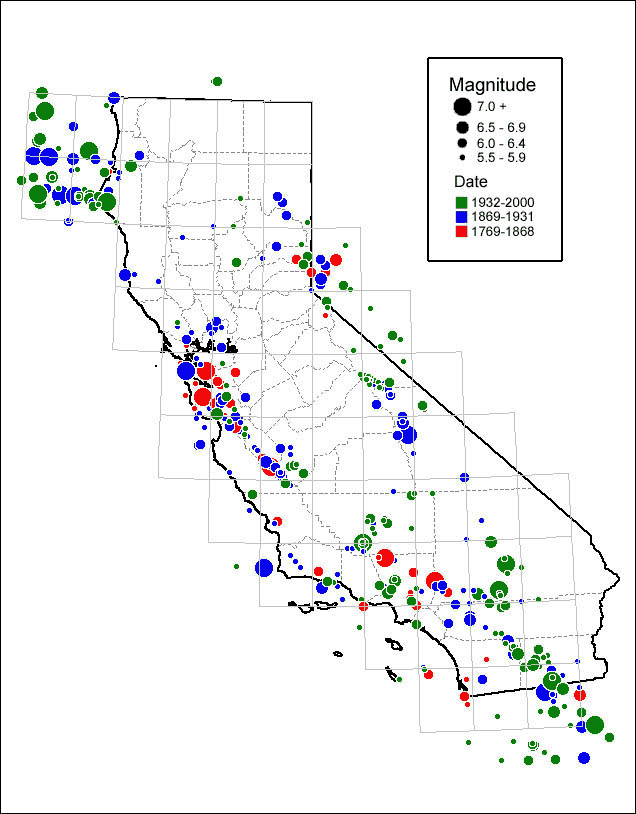
California earthquakes (1769–2000)

According to seismologist Charles Richter, the 1906 San Francisco earthquake moved the United States Government into acknowledging the problem. Prior to that, no agency was specifically focused on researching earthquake activity. The United States Weather Bureau did record when they happened and several United States Geological Survey scientists had briefly disengaged from their regular duties of mapping mineral resources to write reports on the New Madrid and Charleston events, but no trained geologists were working on the problem until after 1906 when the United States Coast and Geodetic Survey was made responsible. The outlook improved when Professor Andrew Lawson brought the state's first monitoring program online at the University of California, Berkeley in 1910 with seismologist Harry Wood, who was later instrumental in getting the Caltech Seismological Laboratory in Pasadena operational in the 1920s.

Early developments at the Caltech lab included an earthquake observation network using their own custom-built short-period seismometers, the Richter scale, and the Modified Mercalli intensity scale (an updated version of the Mercalli intensity scale). In 1933, the Long Beach earthquake occurred in a populated area and damaged or destroyed many public school buildings in Long Beach and Los Angeles. Some decades later, the San Fernando earthquake affected the San Fernando Valley north of Los Angeles with heavy damage to several hospitals. In both cases, the perception of California policy makers changed, and state laws and building codes were modified (with much debate) to require commercial and residential properties to be built to withstand earthquakes. Higher standards were established for fire stations, hospitals, and schools, and construction of dwellings was also restricted near active faults.

== Tectonic setting ==
During the last 66 million years, nearly the entire west coast of North America has been dominated by a subduction zone, with the Farallon plate subducting beneath the North American plate. Presently, the Juan de Fuca plate (with its Explorer and Gorda satellite plates) and the Rivera and Cocos plates are the only remnants of the once much larger Farallon plate. The plate margin that remains in California is that of the strike-slip San Andreas Fault (SAF), the diffuse Pacific–North American plate boundary that extends east into the Basin and Range Province of eastern California and western Nevada (a seismically active area called Walker Lane) and southwest into the California Continental Borderland region off the central and southern coasts. This system of faults terminates in the north at the Mendocino triple junction, one of the most seismically active regions in the state, where earthquakes are occasionally the result of intraplate deformation within the Gorda plate. It terminates in the south at the Salton Sea where displacement transitions to a series of spreading centers and transform faults, beginning with the Brawley seismic zone in the Imperial Valley.

In the San Francisco Bay Area, the San Andreas system of faults spans offshore and into the East Bay area, with the bulk of the faults lying to the east of the main San Andreas fault (SAF). The 2015 Uniform California Earthquake Rupture Forecast (UCERF3) gave a 72% probability that one of these faults will generate a 6.7 M_{w} or greater earthquake in the timespan of 2015–2044. While the SAF is quiet north of San Francisco, the central SAF segment near San Juan Bautista is where aseismic creep was first studied, and to the south is where the recurring Parkfield earthquakes occur. The secondary faults lay to the west of the main SAF at the extreme southern portion, including the active and young San Jacinto Fault Zone, which may be taking over as the primary boundary south of Cajon Pass. A paleoseismic investigation using Lidar revealed that more than 16 feet (5 m) of slip has accumulated since the 1857 event on the southern SAF, which borders the Mojave Desert to the north and east of the Greater Los Angeles Area. Near the Transverse Ranges, reverse and thrust faults have produced damaging earthquakes in Santa Barbara and the San Fernando Valley. The UCERF3 forecast gave a 60% probability that a fault in the Los Angeles area will generate a 6.7 M_{w} or greater earthquake in the timespan of 2015–2044.

== Notable earthquakes ==
Date	Name	Area	Mag.	MMI	Deaths	Injuries	Total damage	Notes
2022-12-20	Ferndale	North Coast	6.4 M_{w}	VIII	2	17		
2019-07-05	Ridgecrest	Eastern	7.1 M_{w}	IX		5	$5.3bn	Doublet
2019-07-04	Ridgecrest	Eastern	6.4 M_{w}	VIII	1	20	$5.3bn	Doublet
2014-08-24	South Napa	North Bay	6.0 M_{w}	VIII	1	~200	$362M–$1bn	
2014-03-28	La Habra	LA Area	5.1 M_{w}	VII		Few	$10.8M	
2010-04-04	Baja California	Baja California	7.2 M_{w}	IX	2–4	100–233	$1.15bn	
2010-01-09	Eureka	North Coast	6.5 M_{w}	VII		35	$21.8–43M	
2008-07-29	Chino Hills	LA Area	5.4 M_{w}	VI		8	Limited	
2007-10-30	Alum Rock	Bay Area	5.6 M_{w}	VI			Limited	
2003-12-22	San Simeon	Central Coast	6.6 M_{w}	VIII	2	40	$250–300M	
2000-09-03	Yountville	North Bay	5.0 M_{w}	VII		41	$10–50M	
1999-10-16	Hector Mine	Eastern	7.1 M_{w}	VII		4–5	Limited	
1994-01-17	Northridge	LA Area	6.7 M_{w}	IX	57	8,700+	$13–40bn	
1992-06-28	Big Bear	Inland Empire	6.5 M_{w}	VIII		63	More than $60M	Triggered
1992-06-28	Landers	Inland Empire	7.3 M_{w}	IX	3	400+	$92M	
1992-04-26	Cape Mendocino	North Coast	6.6 M_{w}	VIII			Some	Triggered
1992-04-26	Cape Mendocino	North Coast	6.5 M_{w}	VIII			Some	Triggered
1992-04-25	Cape Mendocino	North Coast	7.2 M_{w}	IX		98–356	$48–75M	Tsunami
1992-04-22	Joshua Tree	Inland Empire	6.3 M_{s}	VII		32	Light–moderate	
1991-06-28	Sierra Madre	LA Area	5.6 M_{w}	VII	2	100–107	$34–40M	
1990-02-28	Upland	LA Area	5.7 M_{w}	VII		30	$12.7M	
1989-10-17	Loma Prieta	Santa Cruz Mts	6.9 M_{w}	IX	63	3,757	$5.6–6bn	Tsunami
1989-08-08	Loma Prieta	Santa Cruz Mts	5.4 M_{L}	VII	1		Minor	
1987-11-24	Elmore Ranch	Imperial Valley	6.5 M_{w}	VIII	2	90+		Triggered
1987-11-23	Superstition Hills	Imperial Valley	6.1 M_{w}	VIII			$3M	
1987-10-01	Whittier	LA Area	5.9 M_{w}	VIII	8	200	$213–358M	
1986-07-21	Chalfant Valley	Eastern	6.2 M_{w}	VI		2	$2.7M	Sequence
1986-07-13	Oceanside	South Coast	5.8 M_{w}	VI		1	$700k	
1986-07-08	N. Palm Springs	Inland Empire	6.0 M_{w}	VII		29–40	$4.5–6M	
1984-04-24	Morgan Hill	South Bay	6.2 M_{w}	VIII		21–27	$7.5–8M	
1983-05-02	Coalinga	Central Valley	6.2 M_{w}	VIII		94	$10M	
1981-04-26	Westmorland	Imperial Valley	5.9 M_{w}	VII			$1–3M	
1980-11-08	Eureka	North Coast	7.3 M_{w}	VII		6	$2–2.75M	
1980-05-25	Mammoth Lakes	Eastern	6.2 M_{w}	VII		9	$1.5M	Swarm
1980-01-26	Livermore	East Bay	5.4 M_{w}	VII				Doublet
1980-01-24	Livermore	East Bay	5.8 M_{w}	VII			$11.5M	Doublet
1979-10-15	Imperial Valley	Imperial Valley	6.4 M_{w}	IX		91	$30M	
1979-08-06	Coyote Lake	South Bay	5.7 M_{w}	VII		16	$500k	
1978-08-13	Santa Barbara	Central Coast	5.8 M_{w}	VII		65	$12M	
1975-08-01	Butte County	Butte County	5.7 M_{L}	VIII		10	$3M	
1973-02-21	Point Mugu	South Coast	5.8 M_{w}	VII		Several	$1M	
1971-02-09	San Fernando	LA Area	6.6 M_{w}	XI	58–65	200–2,000	$505–553M	
1969-10-01	Santa Rosa	North Bay	5.7 M_{w}	VIII				Doublet
1969-10-01	Santa Rosa	North Bay	5.6 M_{w}	VII	1		$8.35M	Doublet
1968-04-08	Borrego Mtn	Imperial Valley	6.5 M_{w}	VII			Some	Rockslides
1957-03-22	San Francisco	Bay Area	5.7 M_{w}	VII	1	40	$1M	
1954-12-21	Eureka	North Coast	6.5 M_{L}	VII	1	Several	$2.1M	
1952-08-22	Kern County	Central Valley	5.8 M_{w}	VIII	2	Several	$10M	
1952-07-21	Kern County	Central Valley	7.3 M_{w}	XI	12	Hundreds	$60M	
1948-12-04	Desert Hot Springs	Inland Empire	6.4 M_{w}	VII		Several	Minor	
1941-11-14	Torrance–Gardena	LA Area	5.4 M_{s}	VIII			$1.1M	
1941-06-30	Santa Barbara	Central Coast	5.9 M_{w}	VIII			$100k	
1940-05-18	El Centro	Imperial Valley	6.9 M_{w}	X	9	20	$6M	
1933-03-10	Long Beach	South Coast	6.4 M_{w}	VIII	115–120		$40M	
1932-06-06	Eureka	North Coast	6.4 M_{w}	VIII	1	3	Severe	
1927-11-04	Lompoc	Central Coast	7.3 M_{w}				Moderate	Tsunami
1925-06-29	Santa Barbara	Central Coast	6.8 M_{w}	IX	13		$8M	
1923-01-22	Humboldt County	North Coast	7.2 M_{s}				Severe	Tsunami
1920-06-21	Inglewood	LA Area	4.9 M_{L}	VIII			More than $100k	
1918-04-21	San Jacinto	Inland Empire	6.7 M_{w}	IX	1	Several	$200k	
1915-06-22	Imperial Valley	Imperial Valley	5.5 M_{w}	VIII	6		$900k	Doublet
1906-04-18	San Francisco	Northern–Central	7.9 M_{w}	XI	700–3,000+			Conflagration / tsunami
1899-12-25	San Jacinto	Inland Empire	6.7 M_{w}	IX	6		$50k or more	
1898-03-30	Mare Island	North Bay	5.8–6.4 M_{w}	VIII–IX			$350k	
1892-04-21	Vacaville–Winters	Central Valley	6.2 M_{La}	IX				Doublet
1892-04-19	Vacaville–Winters	North Bay	6.4 M_{La}	IX	1		$225–250k	Doublet
1892-02-23	Laguna Salada	Baja California	7.1–7.2 M_{w}	VIII			Moderate	
1873-11-23	Crescent City	North Coast	6.7 M_{La}	VIII			Some	Ground cracks
1872-03-26	Owens Valley	Eastern	7.4–7.9 M_{w}	X	27	56	$250k	
1868-10-21	Hayward	Bay Area	6.3–6.7 M_{w}	IX	30		$350k	
1865-10-08	Santa Cruz Mts	Santa Cruz Mts	6.3 M_{La}	VIII			$500k	
1857-01-09	Fort Tejon	Central–Southern	7.9 M_{w}	IX	2		Severe	
1838-06-??	San Andreas	Bay Area	6.8–7.2 M_{w}	VIII			Minor	
1812-12-21	Ventura	Central Coast	7.1 M_{La}	VIII	1			Tsunami
1812-12-08	San Juan Capistrano	South Coast	6.9–7.5	VII–IX	40		Moderate	
Stover & Coffman 1993 uses various seismic scales. M_{la} is a local magnitude that is equivalent to M_{L} (Richter magnitude scale) and is used for events that occurred prior to the instrumental period. It is based on the area of perceptibility (as presented on isoseismal maps). M_{w} = moment magnitude scale and M_{s} = surface wave magnitude. The inclusion criteria for adding events are based on WikiProject Earthquakes' notability essay that was developed for stand alone articles. The principles described are also applicable to lists. In summary, only damaging, injurious, or deadly events should be recorded. k= thousand, M = million, bn = billion

== See also ==
- Alquist Priolo Special Studies Zone Act
- California earthquake forecast
- Field Act
- Geography of California
- Geology and geological history of California
- Southern California Earthquake Center
- Timeline of the Portolá expedition
