= 1980 Mammoth Lakes earthquakes =

Earthquake in California

- Location within California
- UTC time: 1980-05-25 16:33
- ISC event: 646221
- USGS-ANSS: ComCat
- Local date: May 25, 1980
- Magnitude: 6.2 M_{w}
- Depth: 10.2 km (6.3 mi)
- Epicenter: 37.530°N 118.908°W
- Total damage: $1.5 million
- Max. intensity: MMI VII (Very strong)
- Casualties: 9 injured

The 1980 Mammoth Lakes earthquakes affected Eastern California with the sequence's largest shock occurring on May 25 and measuring M_{w} 6.2. The mainshock and its strong aftershocks located near the Yosemite National Park area were felt in parts of California and Nevada. Nine people were injured and there was significant damage in Mammoth Lakes.

== Earthquakes ==
The source fault was identified as the Hilton Creek Fault; a northwest–southeast striking normal fault straddling the eastern foothills of the Sierra Nevada. The structure is considered geologically young and is one of the "master faults" of the Sierra Nevada range front.

== Impact and aftermath ==
There were nine injuries associated with rockfalls including at least two reported in Yosemite National Park. Damage in Mammoth Lakes was considered the worst with collapsed chimneys, ruptured water pipes, and cracked plasters and windows. A surface rupture propagated beneath and damaged the town's elementary school considerably. Eighty people had to be rescued on Mammoth Mountain after power outages affected ski lifts and gondolas. The additional shock on May 27 injured another four people and similar to the shocks of May 25, was accompanied by landslides and rockfalls in Yosemite National Park.

Officials of Mono County designated the region a local disaster zone. Some of the injured were hospitalised at Mammoth Lakes Hospital. The shocks which occurred on Memorial Day forced leisure activities in the area to cease. Visitors of Mammoth Lakes also began evacuating the town causing a congestion along the main road. At Convict Lake, over 150 visitors across 92 campsites fled the area. Some trails in the area may have been buried under 30 m (98 ft) of debris from landslides. Rescue helicopters were also deployed to look for people potentially trapped by avalanches and rockslides.

== See also ==
- List of earthquakes in 1980
- List of earthquakes in California
