= Geology and geological history of California =

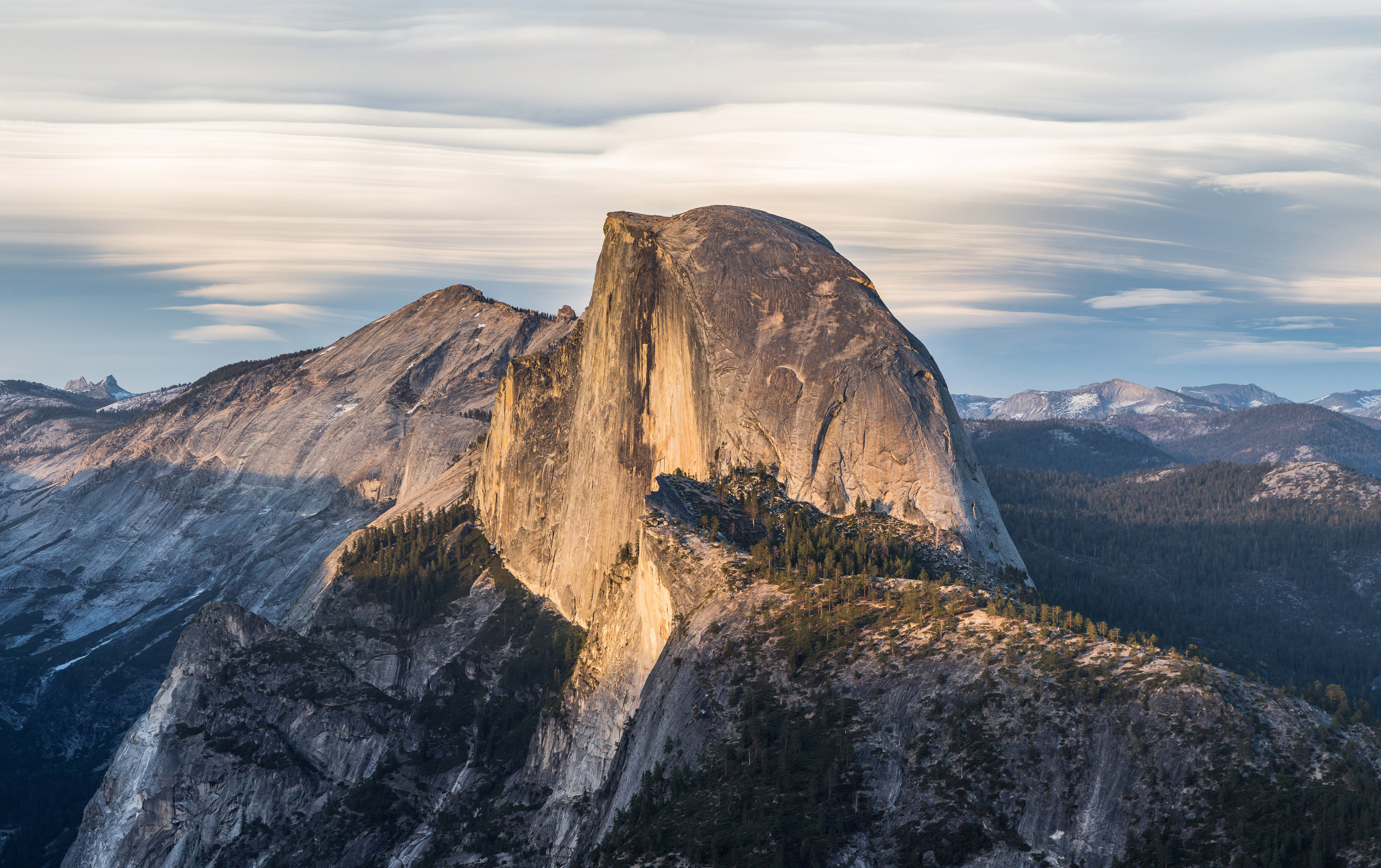
Half Dome from Glacier Point, Yosemite National Park

The geology of California is highly complex, with numerous mountain ranges, substantial faulting and tectonic activity, rich natural resources and a history of both ancient and comparatively recent intense geological activity. The area formed as a series of small island arcs, deep-ocean sediments and mafic oceanic crust accreted to the western edge of North America, producing a series of deep basins and high mountain ranges.

One of the most important events was the advent of the San Andreas Fault around 29 million years ago in the Oligocene, when the region subducted a spreading center in the East Pacific Rise. This produced major crustal stretching, volcanism and displacement of up to 125 miles (201 km).

== Geological history ==
The oldest rocks in California date back 1.8 billion years to the Proterozoic and are found in the San Gabriel Mountains, San Bernardino Mountains, and Mojave Desert. The rocks of eastern California formed a shallow continental shelf, with massive deposition of limestone during the Paleozoic, and sediments from this time are common in the Sierra Nevada, Klamath Mountains and eastern Transverse Range.

Active subduction began in the Triassic during the Mesozoic, producing large granite intrusions and the beginning of the Nevadan Orogeny as well as more dryland conditions and the retreat of the ocean to the west. Throughout the Jurassic the Nevadan Orogeny accelerated with large-scale granitic intrusions and erosion into deep marine basins. These basins steadily filled with sediment, with one famous example preserved as the Great Valley beds in the Coast Ranges. Simultaneously island arcs and small sections of continental crust rafted onto the edge of North America, building out the continent.

During the Cenozoic, the volcanic and deep water sedimentary Franciscan rocks were accreted to the edge of California and vast areas of marine sedimentary rocks deposited in the Central Valley and what would become the Transverse and Coast Ranges. Examples of filled basins included the Los Angeles Basin, the Eel River Basin around Eureka or the 50,000 feet (15,000 m) thick sedimentary sequences of the Ventura Basin. The San Andreas Fault became perhaps most active after the Miocene, potentially resulting in up to 350 miles (560 km) of offset in some locations.

== Regional geology ==
=== California Coast Ranges ===
The California Coast Ranges extend from the Oregon line southward 600 miles (970 km) to the Santa Ynez River. The mountains are drained by the Russian, Eel, Mad and Klamath rivers which tend to follow faults and folds. Per square mile of drainage, the Eel River has the highest suspended sediment load of any river in the US, exceeding the Colorado River and Mississippi River.

The Franciscan subduction complex makes up the basement rock for part of the range, with a mélange dominated by graywacke first deposited in offshore deep ocean basins. These rocks are rich in plagioclase, quartz and chlorite mica (which gives them a greenish color) and range up to 25,000 feet (7,600 m) thick. In some places, they are interbedded with shale, limestone and radiolarian chert. Examples of rock formations in the Franciscan subduction complex include the Calera limestone east of the San Andreas fault or the Laytonville limestone which extends north of San Francisco to Eureka.

Franciscan rocks have a complex geological structure. In some places, ophiolite sequences preserve remnant oceanic crust rock on land, while other parts of the range are intruded with ultrabasic igneous rocks that have serpentinized to peridotite.

In the southern part of the range, between the Nacimiento and San Andreas fault zones, the metamorphic rocks and granite plutons of the Salinian block make up the basement rock. These rocks were likely moved to their current location by the two major faults. Some Great Valley rocks are exposed in the Coastal Ranges as well, like the Jurassic Knoxville Formation shale.

Sur Series schist, quartzite, marble, gneiss and granulite in the Salinian block were likely deposited in a marine shelf late in the Paleozoic. Shelf and slope deposits would ultimately become Great Valley rocks, while the trench deposits became the Franciscan subduction complex.

Major geologic changes began in the Cenozoic with continued continental shelf deposition of shale, sandstone and clay as well as near-shore tropical coal deposits. During the Miocene, the Coast Ranges were flooded again, with underwater volcanic eruptions in the southern part of the range and deposition of fossil-rich shales like the Monterey formation. Uplift took place into the Pliocene and Pleistocene, slowly reducing sea levels inland in the Central Valley.

The Coast Range is at even higher risk for damaging landslides than other parts of coastal California due to sheared serpentinite in Franciscan basement rocks.

=== Central Valley ===
The Central Valley includes the southern San Joaquin Valley and the northern Sacramento Valley. The Great Valley Sequence is a 40,000 feet (12,000 m) thick formation at the western edge of the Central Valley that formed between the Jurassic and Cretaceous, overlying the Franciscan Assemblage and granite rocks associated with the Sierra Nevada to the east. It represents an ancient forearc basin that took shape as oceanic crust subducted under the west edge of the continent.

During the Jurassic, many sediments shed into the region from the rising proto-Sierra Nevada. For much of the Cenozoic the region was filled with lakes and brackish swamps. Thick Miocene sediments formed in narrow seaways from the Pacific. The Stockton fault and White Wolf fault by Bakersfield are both major tectonic features. The 7.6 magnitude 1952 Kern County earthquake was one of the most powerful in California in the 20th century. The subsurface is well known from oil wells and oil fields are bounded in the east by the Kern Front fault. A small andesitic dome near Marysville is the only example of volcanic rocks in the valley exposed near the surface.

=== Coronado Island ===
The distinctive Coronado Island in San Diego County helps to create the large sheltered harbor of San Diego. It formed as a sandspit filled in to the north from sediment deposited by the Tijuana River and sheltered from wind and waves by the Cretaceous uplands of Point Loma. Two small islands to the north: North Island and South Island have been connected with fill to create the Naval Air Station. Without continuous dredging, San Diego Bay would fill with sediment and become dry land with deposition from the San Diego, Sweetwater and Otay rivers.

=== Klamath Mountains ===
The Klamath Mountains formed as small island arc terranes accreted against the coast of North America before and during the Devonian and overlain by newer rocks, deposited from the Cretaceous to modern times. Geologists have subdivided the four terranes in the mountain range, referring to them as "plates".

The Klamath Mountains have several areas of preserved oceanic crust. The Josephine ophiolite forms the basement of the western Klamath Mountains, with extensive peridotite from the boundary between the oceanic crust and the mantle, as well as chromite and nickel deposits. It is exposed in the Smith River drainage to the north of US Highway 199 in Del Norte County. By contrast, the Trinity ophiolite is found in the east, known for its numerous ultramafic rocks and being one of the most extensive ophiolites in the US. The Western Jurassic Plate stretches for 220 miles (350 km) on the western edge of the mountains. The thick Galice formation slate and metamorphosed greywacke overlie the Josephine ophiolite and likely deposited in a deep ocean environment offshore of the island arc. It also interfingers with up to 23,000 feet (7,000 m) of volcanic rocks in the Rogue Formation. Some rocks in the Western Jurassic Plate seem to have been subducted, reaching blueschist grade metamorphism in the sequence of metamorphic facies in the South Fork Mountain schist.

By contrast, the Eastern Klamath Plate is made up of limestone, chert and pyroclastic rocks, divided in half by the Trinity ophiolite. A thrust fault, known as the Trinity or Bully Choop thrust, separates the Eastern Klamath Plate from the Central Metamorphic Plate. This region of the mountains was likely underthrusted by the adjoining plates, producing multiple schists around 380 to 400 million years ago in the Ordovician. Many of these schists, like the Condrey Mountain schist are more resistant to erosion than other rocks close by. The Western Paleozoic and Triassic Plate is the most common unit of the Klamath Mountains and is up to 50 miles (80 km) wide at the Oregon state line. Geologists have struggled to define its structural geology with complex sequences of deep ocean crust, upper mantle rock and tectonic melanges.

Granite plutons emplaced during the Jurassic and Cretaceous, forming rock units like the Ironside Mountain diorite, which outcrops for 37 miles (60 km) from the Orleans Mountain lookout tower to the line between Humboldt County and Siskiyou County or the Shasta Bally batholith at Buckhorn Summit west of Redding. A few may date earlier, like the 400 million year old Mule Mountain. During the Pleistocene, the mountains had a large number of glaciers and cirques and glacially-carved U-shaped valleys are remaining features from that time period. Large boulders have often eroded out of moraine deposits, coming to rest a few miles away. Fast flowing rivers meant that the region has accumulated very little alluvium, except for a rare 400-foot (120 m) thick deposit in Scott Valley, southwest of Yreka, California.

=== Modoc Plateau ===
The Modoc Plateau is an undulating expanse of Miocene to Holocene basalt law flows at the southwest edge of the Columbia Plateau, covering 10,000 square miles (26,000 km^{2}). It is drained by the Pit River, which ultimately reaches Shasta Lake and the Sacramento River. The Warner Basalt is the most common rock in the plateau, bordered by the Surprise Valley fault zone that first became active in the Miocene 15 million years ago. Based on faulting in recent alluvial material, the Surprise Valley fault zone is still active.

In spite of low rainfall, the numerous lava tubes and volcanic fractures in the plateau produce the Fall River Springs, one of the largest springs in the US. At least 300 lava tubes are known in Lava Beds National Monument, some of which preserve ice year round.

The rugged terrain of the Modoc Plateau played an important role in the Modoc War. In 1873, 53 Modoc men held off 650 US troops, killing 70 of them in heavy weather in the lava plateau to the south of Tule Lake. The Modoc exploited collapse pits and lava tunnels, turning to Tule Lake for food (subsequent drainage has reduced the lake shoreline).

=== Mojave Desert ===
The Mojave Desert extends into areas of Basin and Range terrain and includes some of the oldest rocks exposed at the surface in California. The movement of the San Andreas Fault and Garlock Fault helped to induce arid conditions during the Cenozoic. Unlike most of California, the Mojave region has numerous Precambrian Proterozoic rocks, such as granitic gneiss or marble intruded with porphyry in the Ord Mountains or schist in the Old Woman Mountains.

The Marble Mountain Cambrian quartzite lies unconformably atop Proterozoic granites. During the Jurassic high sea levels retreated, switching to the deposition of the terrestrial Aztec sandstone. Volcanic rocks erupted around Barstow in the Triassic. Lake beds interbedded with volcanic ash are typical of the Cenozoic. Volcanism continued through the Holocene, forming the 300 foot thick basalts of the Cima Volcanic Field or the Barstow-Amboy axis of volcanic craters, which have protected underlying granite from erosion. Unique geology in the region formed bastnaesite mined at the Mountain Pass rare earth mine. Additionally, borate deposited during arid conditions, with mining after 1926.

=== Newport Bay ===
At the edge of the Los Angeles coastal plain and just west of the San Joaquin Hills, Newport Bay is a major hub of boating. Geologists have interpreted the bay as the drowned channel of the Santa Ana River. Flow in and out of the estuary has been controlled with a man-made structure since heavy silting in 1915. Virtually all of the islands in the bay are man-made from dredged sediments. However, a bulge in the bay's sand spit records offshore presence of the Newport submarine canyon. In the 19th century, a railroad pier was built out into the canyon to avoid waves closer in to shore when loading and unloading ships.

=== Peninsular Ranges ===
The Peninsular Ranges are a group of mountain ranges that extend 900 miles (1,400 km) from the Los Angeles basin and Transverse Ranges southward the entire length of Baja California. The eastern ranges, including the Santa Rosa Mountains are typically over 6,000 feet (1,800 m) high, with San Jacinto Peak reaching 10,805 feet (3,293 m), whereas the western ranges like the Santa Ana, Agua Tibia and Laguna mountains are lower.

Like the Sierra Nevada, the Peninsular Ranges have gentle western slopes and steep eastern faces. The mountains are drained by the Santa Margarita, San Luis Rey, San Diego and San Dieguito rivers, while San Felipe Creek in the east drains into the Salton Sea. The oldest "roof" rocks in the Peninsular Ranges date to the Paleozoic, such as limestone deposits near Riverside quarried for the concrete industry. The oldest rocks are found in the San Jacinto and Santa Rosa mountains, with schist and gneiss that may be up to 22,000 feet (6,700 m) thick.

With the exception of some metasedimentary and metavolcanic rocks, most rocks in the Peninsular Ranges are igneous and Jurassic in age, dating to the time of the Nevadan orogeny. Most intrusive igneous rocks are tonalite, granodiorite, quartz diorite or gabbro. Geologists group the plutons of the Peninsular Ranges as the Southern California batholith, which includes several large individual plutons like the San Marcos Gabbro, Woodson Mountain Granodiorite or Bonsall Tonalite.

Compared with the Sierra Nevada, rocks from this time period tend be more calcic than silicic. The rocks likely formed much further away from the Sierras and were relocated by the dramatic movements of faults.

A thick sequence of mostly terrestrial sedimentary rocks including the Rosario, Ladd, Trabuco and Williams formations is exposed on the western slope of the Santa Ana Mountains and Santa Ana Canyon, stretching southward to Camp Pendleton, San Onofre, and smaller exposures in Encinitas, Leucadia, Point Loma and La Jolla. These rocks date to the Cretaceous, with a lower sequence of conglomerate overlain by sandstone and shale, with huge ammonite fossils.

In the early Cenozoic, widespread erosion of crystalline rocks inland produced huge quantities of sediment which deposited on the Cretaceous rocks of the Peninsular Ranges. Examples include the Silverado Formation with 1,400 feet (430 m) of Paleocene terrestrial sedimentary rock in the Santa Anas or the Eocene Poway Formation near San Diego. The Poway Formation has rounded metavolcanic pebbles with no known source nearby, suggesting an original source somewhere in Sonora before a major offset to the north by faults. Much more recent Pliocene terrestrial sedimentary rocks are also common in the northern Peninsular Ranges like the San Timoteo Canyon and Mount Eden conglomerate, sandstone and siltstone which are up to 7,000 feet (2,100 m) thick. Fossils are common in the marine rocks of the Pacific Beach and Mission Bay formation around San Diego.

The Peninsular Ranges were never glaciated during the Pleistocene. In the nineteenth century, mining began in the vicinity of Julian, extracting nickel and gold, in the Julian Schist. Hot springs including San Jacinto, Eden, Saboba and Gilman are active in the San Jacinto Mountains due to the presence of the San Jacinto fault zone and Elsinore was founded on its hot springs.

=== San Francisco Bay, San Pablo Bay and Suisun Bay ===
The three interconnected Suisun, San Pablo and San Francisco bays occupy a structural depression dating to the Pliocene which flooded several times due to Pleistocene glaciations. Underlying these bays is the Merced Formation, with 45,000 feet (14,000 m) of marine rocks overlain by 500 feet (150 m) of terrestrial sedimentary rocks and capped with more modern sediments from the Sacramento River.

The bay system was the second place in the US to be mapped in 1826 by Edward Belcher and Alex Collie, a surveyor and surgeon respectively on the British survey vessel HMS Blossom.

Hydraulic mining associated with the California Gold Rush greatly accelerated the silting up of the bays until the practice was prohibited in 1884. The majority of bay waters are now less than 30 feet (9.1 m) deep,

=== Sierra Nevada ===
The basement rocks of the Sierra Nevada date to the Paleozoic and include rocks in the Shoo Fly complex and Grizzly Formation. These deposited as part of a series of small island arcs, "rafted" against the coast of the proto-North American continent Laurentia. In the Shoo Fly complex, the Bullpen Lake sequence has bedded cherts and cooled pillow lava that closely resembles the geology of guyots, flat-topped undersea volcanoes, suggesting a deep-sea origin for the base of the Sierras sometime before the Devonian. In the Triassic, the Paleozoic rocks of the Calaveras complex were heaved under the Shoo Fly complex by the Sonoma orogeny, which is preserved in roof pendants and country rock inclusions. During the Nevadan orogeny in the Jurassic, extensive folding and faulting altered the rocks and huge granite batholiths erupted.

The Foothill Metamorphic Belt likely came ashore as an island arc terrane, colliding with the edge of North America to the west of the current Melones fault zone. This added metavolcanic and metasedimentary rocks to the slowly building Sierras.

Geologists debate how high the early Sierra Nevada were. twenty-five thousand feet (7,600 m) of Jurassic marine sediments in the Sacramento Valley do not necessarily correspond exactly to the height of the mountains, but fist-sized cobbles in conglomerates from the Cretaceous suggest steep conditions and potentially higher altitudes than today. Most erosion of the Sierra Nevada was finished by the Eocene and faulting may have reactivated the roots of the mountains to create the current mountain range.

The geomorphology of the Sierra Nevada is comparatively recent, dating to as recently as the Quaternary. Movement along the Sierra Nevada fault helped to create the new Muir Crest and parts of the mountain range rose up to 10,000 feet (3,000 m) over the last three million years, creating a steep face to the west of Owens Valley.

North of the San Joaquin River, the mountains have a tilted-block pattern caused the Sierra Nevada fault, which is interpreted as being similar to the more common Basin and Range terrain to the east. However, the Greenhorn Fault system is more active to the south, extending to the Tehachapi Mountains and causing more plateau-like landforms.

Volcanic eruptions in the Miocene between 9.5 and 3.5 million years ago filled old eroded canyons in parts of the Sierras with lava flows. The Kern River and San Joaquin River both run in valleys "refilled" with lava.

Rhyolite volcanic ash buried other streams during the Oligocene forming tuff that early miners need to dig through to get at placer gold, and many old buildings in the region are made of blocks of tuff.

=== Transverse Ranges ===
The Transverse Ranges extend from Point Arguello to Joshua Tree National Park, bounded by the San Andreas Fault to the north. It is the only coastal mountain range in the US—and potentially North America—with rocks older than the Phanerozoic.

The Santa Ynez Mountains extend up the coast of Santa Barbara County and contain Franciscan basement rocks (also referred to as the Franciscan basement complex) like the Coast Ranges. These are Jurassic and Cretaceous age greywacke, chert, basalt, ultrabasic rocks and serpentinite from modified oceanic crust. Subsequently, sandstone and shale deposited while the region was still underwater. Up to 1,000 feet (300 m) of sandstone and red shale deposited during the Eocene, after which sea levels dropped in the Oligocene preserved the sand, gravel and silt of the Sespe Formation. Before the end of the Oligocene, sea levels rose again leaving behind the Vaqueros Formation and then the Miocene deep water silt and clay of the Rincon Formation.

As deep basins up to one mile (1.6 km) deep formed in the Miocene and filled with thick sediments, volcanic eruptions related to the San Andreas Fault led to rhyolite and basalt eruptions. All of these rocks were uplifted in the Pleistocene at the same time as the Coast Range orogeny and formed an anticlinal arch or tilted block against the Santa Ynez fault in the north. Because the mountain range is young only a very narrow coastal plain has developed around Santa Barbara.

Similar rock formations and patterns are found throughout Ventura County, in the Topatopa Mountains and Pine Mountains. Thick Pliocene marine rocks up to 14,000 feet (4,300 m) thick are found on the edges of the Santa Clara River Valley and parts of the San Fernando Valley, stretching to Fillmore. Major uplift was going on in Pleistocene, with some marine terraces raised 1,000 feet (300 m).

The Santa Monica Mountains and the Channel Islands are different than the mountains to the north because they have granitic and metamorphic basement rocks more like the Sierra Nevada. The oldest rock in this part of the range is the Santa Monica Slate. Thick sequences of marine rocks from the Late Cretaceous through the Paleocene and Eocene are common in the mountains and on San Miguel Island.

During the Miocene, a deep marine channel filled with up to 15,000 feet (4,600 m) of sediment which is most of the rock exposed on the Channel Islands. Pillow structures from rapid cooling water indicate underwater volcanism that produced basalt, andesite and diabase flows during the Miocene. In fact volcanic rocks are 10,000 feet (3,000 m) thick in the western part of the Santa Monica Mountains. The San Onofre Breccia also formed during this period with distinct glaucophane schist, gabbro, limestone and greenschist. The Transverse Ranges are poorly drained by streams, but subject to periodic intense flooding, typically every 20 to 25 years. In 1815, the Los Angeles River, which at the time drained to Long Beach, flooded so substantially that it changed course, joining Ballona Creek and flowing to Santa Monica Bay, before another flood in 1825 redirected it back to Long Beach.

Serious flooding in 1862 created a 3-mile-wide (4.8 km) lake in the Santa Ana River, while serious flooding in 1938 inundated the San Fernando Valley and parts of the Los Angeles coastal plain, damaging 100 bridges and killing 43 people.

== Natural resource geology ==
=== Gold mining in the Sierra Nevada ===
Most of the gold historically mined in California originated in the Mother Lode belt, located in the foothills of the western Sierras. Most of the gold deposits date to the Cretaceous and formed in narrow belt around the Melones fault in quartz veins. Deep hydrothermal systems active in marine sedimentary rocks as they were being metamorphosed emplaced the gold.

Initially, hydraulic mining was used to get at placer deposits, but it destroyed the landscape and choked rivers with sediments, ultimately being banned the California government in 1884.

=== Mining in the Klamath Mountains ===
Historically, 20 percent of the four million ounces of gold mined in California originated in the Klamath Mountains. Major Pierson Reading found gold in 1848 in the Trinity River near Douglas City. Miners extracted placer gold or dug up fossil placers in the Weaverville Formation and Hornbrook Formation. Gold lodes upstream of the placers were found as well, the largest being French Gulch 15 miles (24 km) west of Redding.

Gold appears in quartz veins that cut through slate, siltstone and shale originating in the Shasta Bally batholith. In addition to gold, platinum is sometimes found with gold placers. Chromite weathers out of peridotite in the Josephine ophiolite in Del Norte County and some beach placers close to Crescent City have up to seven percent chromite. The West Shasta district has a long history of copper and zinc production out of chalcopyrite and sphalerite. These sulfide minerals derive from the Copley Greenstone and or sea floor vents when the region was far offshore and formed as hot water "invaded" the Balaklala rhyolite. Around Shasta Reservoir are other copper and zinc deposits in the Triassic-age Bully Hill rhyolite.

=== Mercury and gold mining in the Coast Ranges ===
About 85 percent of mercury produced in the US throughout its history was mined in the Coast Ranges, with about $200 million worth extracted between 1850 and 1980. Mercury was first discovered in Santa Barbara County in 1796. New Idria, New Almaden and mines in the Mayacmas Mountains have been the main sources throughout history.

The New Almaden mine opened in 1824, ultimately extending 2,450 feet (750 m) below ground. By 1861 it already extended 250 feet (76 m) below ground and produced 970 flasks of mercury a month. In the late 20th century, enough gold was found in association with mercury, arsenic, tungsten and thallium to open the McLaughlin mine in the Mayacmas Mountains around Knoxville.

=== Oil and gas in California ===
Over 40 different oil and gas fields are found in association with the Transverse Ranges and their surrounding basins. Oil was first extracted in 1850 from the Pico Canyon field, close to Newhall with larger-scale production by 1875. The Ventura Avenue field, north of Ventura is one of the largest fields in California, producing since 1903.

The small Conejo field to the east of Camarillo was geologically unusual in that the reservoir rock is fractured volcanic rock from the Miocene. Its main production ran from 1892 to the 1940s, supplying lubricating oil for other refineries. A machinist leased the property and used windmills to get small remaining amounts of oil out.

California was the first place in the US to develop offshore oil drilling in the Summerland field, first discovered in 1896. In all, 20 oil fields are located in the Santa Barbara Channel, with one of the largest—the Dos Cuadras field—found in 1968, although a major spill on January 18, 1969, hampered interest in the field. Depth to oil is very shallow in the Santa Barbara Channel fields, at only 300 feet (91 m) below the sea floor.

Oil drilling in the Wilmington field caused up to 30 feet (9.1 m) of subsidence at the eastern end of Terminal Island between 1937 and 1958. Construction workers needed to build dikes to protect a power plant and jack up bridges. Oil is also abundant in the San Joaquin Valley, but almost non-existent in the Sacramento Valley. Gas was first consumed in Stockton in the 1850s and the massive Rio Vista gas field was discovered in 1936. Substantially folding at the edge of the valley creates famous oil-producing dome structures like Lost Hills and Kettleman Hills.

== See also ==
- List of earthquakes in California
