= 1992 Big Bear earthquake =

Earthquake in California

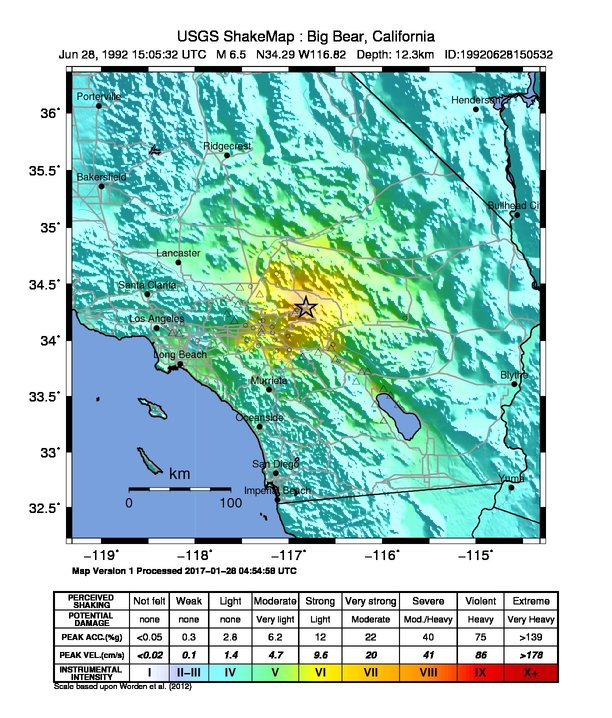

- UTC time: 1992-06-28 15:05:33
- ISC event: 289115
- USGS-ANSS: ComCat
- Local date: June 28, 1992; 34 years ago
- Local time: 08:05:33 PDT
- Magnitude: 6.5 M_{w}
- Depth: 3.1 miles (5 km)
- Epicenter: 34.29°N 116.82°W
- Type: Strike-slip
- Areas affected: Inland Empire; Southern California; United States
- Total damage: ≥$60 million
- Max. intensity: MMI VIII (Severe)
- Foreshocks: 5.2 M_{w} June 28 at 14:43
- Aftershocks: 5.3 M_{w} July 9 at 01:43; 5.2 M_{w} Nov 27 at 16:00; 5.1 M_{w} Dec 4 at 02:08
- Casualties: 63 injuries

The 1992 Big Bear earthquake occurred at 08:05:33 PDT on June 28 in Big Bear Lake, California, with a moment magnitude of 6.5 and a maximum perceived intensity of VIII (Severe) on the Mercalli intensity scale. The earthquake occurred at a relatively shallow depth of 5 kilometers (3.1 mi).

== Earthquake ==
The Big Bear earthquake happened east of Los Angeles, and 3 hours 8 minutes after the M 7.3 1992 Landers earthquake occurred 22 miles (35 km) to the east. It was first believed to be an aftershock of the larger event. However, the United States Geological Survey determined that it was a separate, but related, shock. The two events are considered a regional sequence, rather than a main shock and aftershock. They were part of a complex pattern of regional stress adjustment that also led to the 1999 Hector Mine earthquake.

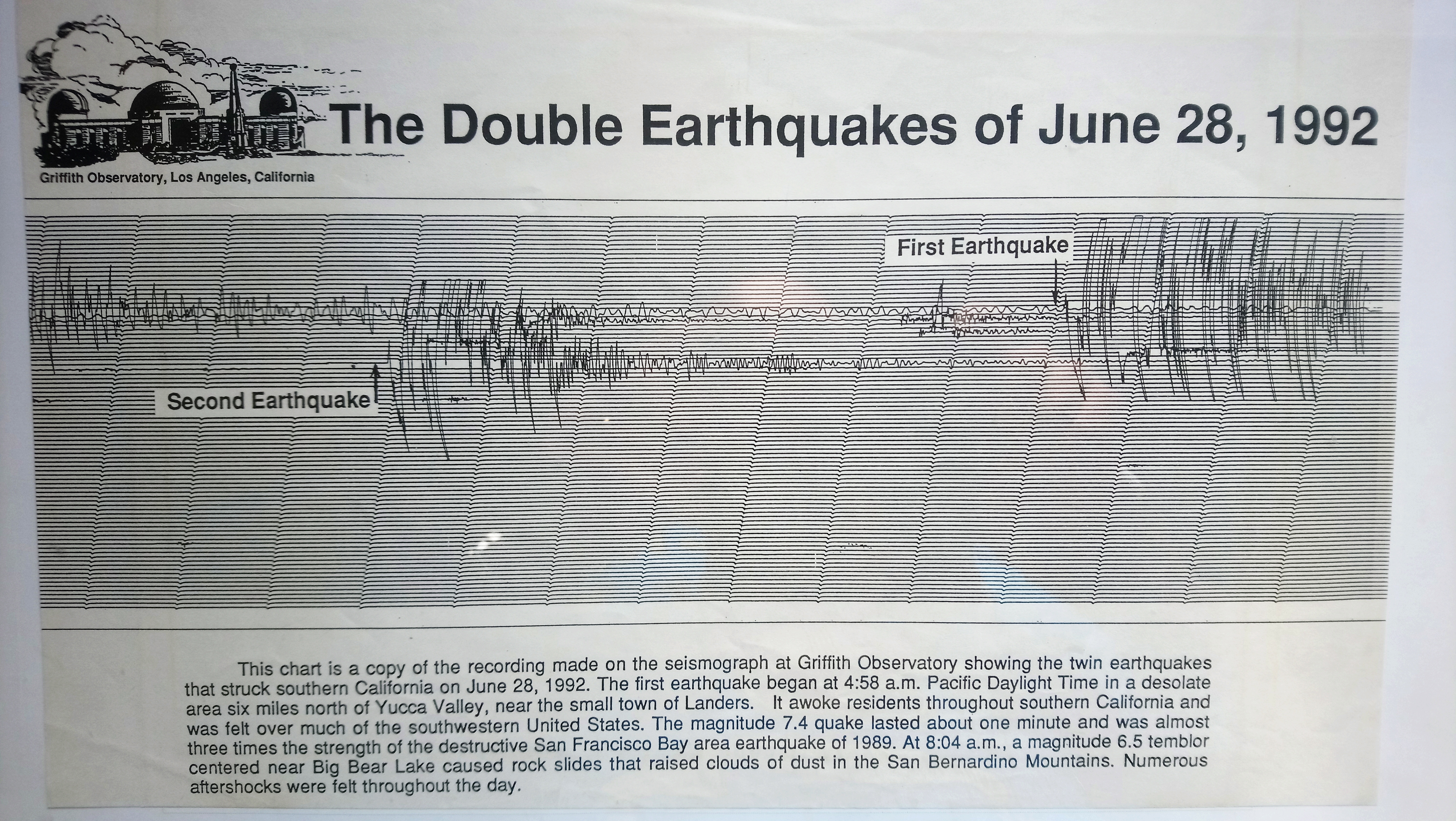
A copy of the Seismograph printout at the Griffith Observatory, showing the Landers and Big Bear earthquakes on June 28th 1992

== Damage ==
In the Big Bear area, severe damage was reported. Roughly 2,600 chimneys were destroyed, 20 homes were knocked off their foundations, and many unreinforced masonry structures partially or completely collapsed. Ruptured gas pipelines and dislodged fuel tanks caused by the tremor sparked fires that destroyed additional structures. The earthquake also caused landslides in the San Bernardino Mountains, blocking several roadways and creating dust clouds that led many to believe forest fires were occurring. The Stanfield Cutoff was heavily damaged, and had to be closed for several days for repairs.

Marilyn Quayle, wife of then-Vice President Dan Quayle, toured the damage in Big Bear. In total, approximately 40 percent of structures in the Big Bear area suffered some degree of damage, amounting to more than $60 million in losses. 63 injuries were attributed to this earthquake, most of which were minor.

== See also ==
- List of earthquakes in California
- List of earthquakes in the United States
