= 1983 Coalinga earthquake =

Earthquake affecting Central California

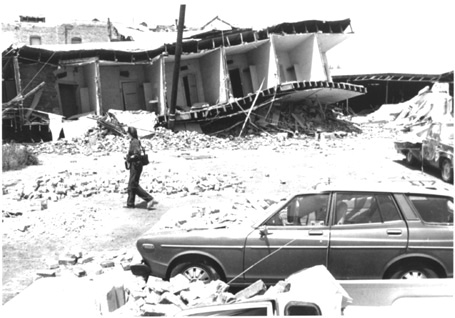
- A destroyed building on 5th Street in Coalinga

- UTC time: 1983-05-02 23:42:37
- ISC event: 575305
- USGS-ANSS: ComCat
- Local date: May 2, 1983; 43 years ago
- Local time: 4:42 p.m
- Magnitude: 6.2 M_{w}
- Depth: 10 kilometers (6 mi)
- Epicenter: 36.23°N 120.31°W
- Type: Blind thrust
- Areas affected: Central California; United States
- Total damage: US$10 million
- Max. intensity: MMI VIII (Severe)
- Landslides: Yes
- Aftershocks: 5.9 M_{w} July 22 at 02:39
- Casualties: 94 injured

The 1983 Coalinga earthquake struck at 4:42 p.m. Monday, May 2 of that year, in Coalinga, California.

The shock was felt from the Greater Los Angeles Area north to Susanville in Lassen County, and between the Pacific Coast and western Nevada. More than 5,000 aftershocks were recorded through July 31, of which 894 had a magnitude of 2.5 or larger. It measured 6.2 on the moment magnitude scale and had a maximum Mercalli intensity of VIII (Severe).

== Earthquake ==
The Coalinga quake was caused by an 0.5-meter uplift of an anticline ridge northeast of Coalinga, but surface faulting was not observed. Ground and aerial reconnaissance immediately after the quake revealed ground cracks and fissures within about 10 kilometers (6.2 mi) of the epicenter, none of which appeared to represent movement on deeply rooted fault structures. About five weeks later, on June 11, an aftershock caused surface faulting about 12 km (7.5 mi) northwest of Coalinga.

=== Damage ===
The earthquake caused an estimated $10 million in property damage (according to the American Red Cross) and injured 94 people. Damage was most severe in Coalinga, where the eight-block downtown commercial district was almost destroyed. Here, buildings having unreinforced brick walls sustained the heaviest damage. Newer buildings, such as the Bank of America and the Guarantee Savings and Loan, only sustained superficial damage. The most significant damage outside the Coalinga area was at Avenal, 31 kilometers (19 mi) southeast of the epicenter.

A disaster assessment by the American Red Cross listed the following statistics on damage in the area: almost destroyed – 309 single-family houses and 33 apartment buildings; major damage – 558 single-family houses, 94 mobile homes, and 39 apartment buildings; and minor damage – 811 single-family houses, 22 mobile homes, and 70 apartment buildings. Most public buildings, including the City Hall, hospital, schools, fire house, post office, and police station, only sustained minor damage.

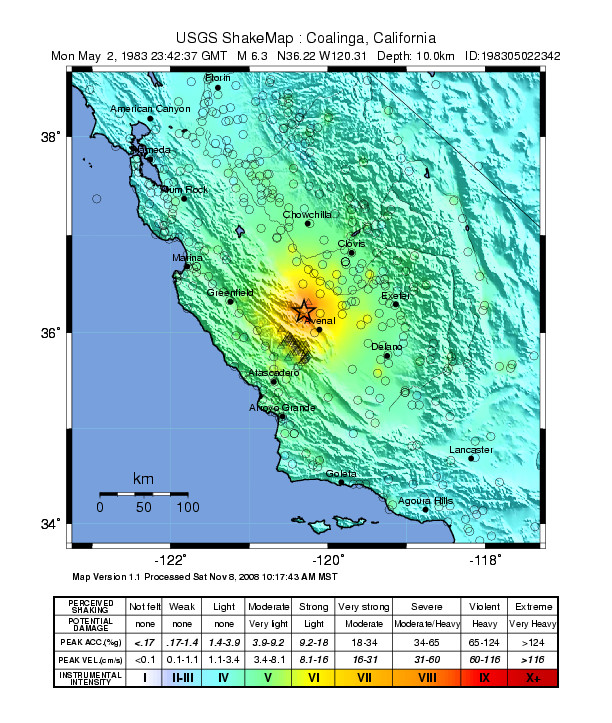
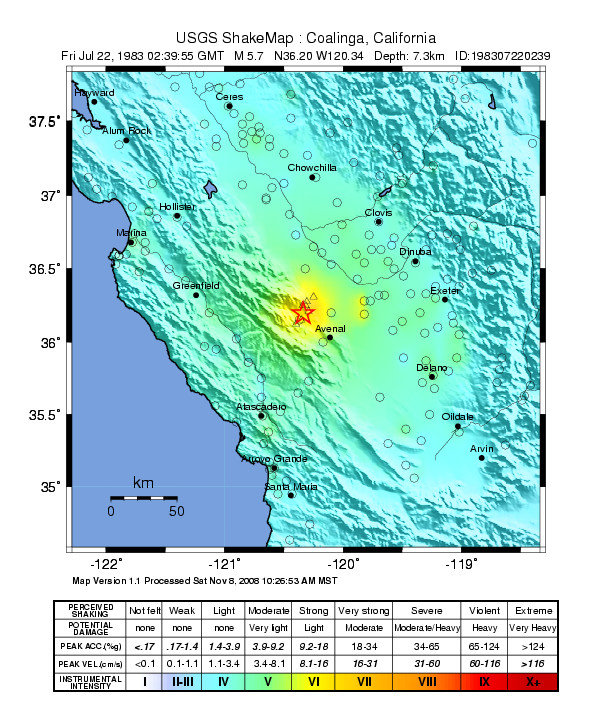
USGS ShakeMaps for the mainshock (left) and the July 22 aftershock

Six bridges of 60 in the area sustained measurable structural damage, which consisted of hairline cracks and spalling at the top of the support columns, fracturing and displacement of wing walls and parapets, and settlement of fill.

All public utilities were damaged, but the water system continued to function despite many leaks in its transmission piping. Gas was shut off for several days because of broken piping and leaks, but only temporary interruptions of electric and telephone services were reported. One large section of old concrete sewerage west of the downtown area partially collapsed but continued to function.

In the oil fields near Coalinga, surface facilities such as pumping units, storage tanks, pipelines, and support buildings were all damaged to some degree. One oil company administration building, about 7 km (4.3 mi) north of Coalinga, sustained major structural damage, and its two brick chimneys toppled. Subsurface damage, including collapsed or parted well casing, was observed on fourteen of 1,725 active wells.

=== Ground effects ===
The earthquake triggered thousands of rock falls and rock slides as far as 34 km (21 mi) northwest, 15 km (9.3 mi) south, and 26 km (16 mi) southwest of the epicenter. Only a few slope failures occurred east of the epicenter because of the absence of steep slopes in that direction.

== Aftermath ==
The California Seismic Safety Commission investigated the temblor, provided funding and expert technical assistance for planning and reconstruction and published a report on the quake. Coalinga recovered 98 percent of its expenses in repairing and rebuilding public buildings at a time when an 85 percent recovery was considered a success.

The Coalinga earthquake suggested to geologists that the state of California was in worse seismological danger than had been thought. The pace of earthquake activity along the Pacific coast was identified as a relevant subject for further study, and the investigation of earthquakes stemming from unknown faults caused concern. California officials said that a predicted great quake would do far more damage than this one and that if it struck in a densely populated area the damage would be incalculable.

== See also ==
- List of earthquakes in 1983
- List of earthquakes in California
- List of earthquakes in the United States
