= 1999 Hector Mine earthquake =

Magnitude 7.1 earthquake in California

- Location within California
- UTC time: 1999-10-16 09:46:45
- ISC event: 1643776
- USGS-ANSS: ComCat
- Local date: October 16, 1999
- Local time: 02:46:45 PDT
- Magnitude: 7.1 M_{w}
- Depth: 20 km (12 mi)
- Epicenter: 34.54°N 116.39°W
- Type: Strike-slip
- Areas affected: Southern California; United States
- Total damage: Limited
- Max. intensity: MMI VII (Very strong)
- Casualties: 4–5 injured

The 1999 Hector Mine earthquake occurred in Southern California, United States, on October 16 at 02:46:50 PDT. Its moment magnitude was 7.1 and the earthquake was preceded by 12 foreshocks, the largest of which had a magnitude of 3.8. The event is thought to have been triggered by the 1992 Landers earthquake which occurred seven years earlier. It also deformed nearby faults vertically and horizontally. The earthquake's hypocenter was at a depth of 20 kilometers and its epicenter at 34.603° N 116.265° W.

The earthquake caused minimal damage and no fatalities due to the distance of its epicenter from populated centers. The significance of this earthquake lies in the fact that, firstly, it had a relatively-high magnitude but caused little damage and secondly, it offered more evidence that stress accumulation over time causes earthquakes.

== Precursor events ==
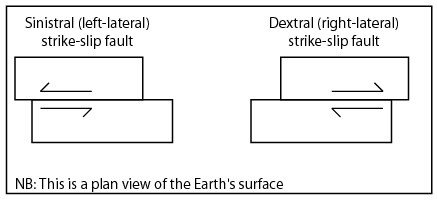
A visual representation of a right-lateral strike slip fault

It is thought that the 1999 Hector Mine earthquake may have been triggered by the 1992 Landers earthquake seven years prior, since the recurrence interval of large earthquakes in the Eastern California Shear Zone is considered to be in the order of thousands of years. That event had a magnitude of 7.3, similar to the Hector Mine quake, was also a strike slip event. Another reason why the Landers earthquake is likely to have triggered the Hector Mine earthquake as they both occurred 20 kilometers apart. The Hector Mine earthquake is thought to be an example of increased fault stress from a separate quake which built over seven years until finally rupturing in 1999. As a result, studying of the Landers earthquake became quite important in understanding this new earthquake near the turn of the century.

== Foreshocks ==
During a fault rupture, stress is released as two sides of fault slip and move past each other. Stress can be transferred from one fault to adjacent faults, causing subsequent fault ruptures. By nature, foreshocks are not possible to identify as such until after the main shock or largest magnitude of shaking occurs. For this reason, they can not be used to predict larger earthquakes or give warnings to residents of the affected area. That being said, it was determined after the fact that a sequence of twelve foreshocks preceded the Hector Mine main shock. These foreshocks progressed northward 20 hours before the mainshock, and occurred in the same location as a cluster of off-fault aftershocks of the 1992 Landers earthquake. The largest of the twelve foreshocks had a magnitude of 3.8 and occurred at 7:41 PM PDT on the 15th of October.

== Earthquake ==
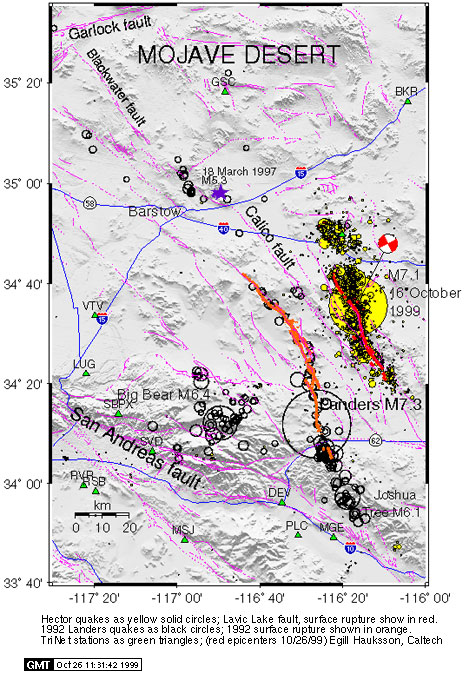
Map showing the relative location of the 1999 Hector Mine Earthquake and its foreshocks.

This strike-slip earthquake occurred in a remote part of the Mojave Desert, 47 miles (76 km) east-southeast of Barstow, California, inside the Twentynine Palms Marine Corps Base. Strike-slip faults are fractures where the blocks have mostly moved horizontally. If the block under the right foot of the observer straddling the fault moves towards the observer, the slip style is termed right lateral; if the block under the observer's left foot moves towards the observer, the fault is termed left lateral. This right-lateral strike-slip quake involved rupturing the Lavic Lake fault and the Bullion Fault.

Within the last two months of when it occurred, the 1999 Hector Mine earthquake was one of four earthquakes recorded with a magnitude of 7 or greater. The earthquake was one of the strongest to occur during the last 100 years. The event was named after a nearby quarry in the Mojave Desert, located 22 kilometers (14 mi) northwest of the epicenter. Despite its size, it did not cause nearly as much damage compared to the smaller magnitude 6.7 1994 Northridge earthquake due to its remote location from populated areas. The earthquake was felt in much of Southern California as well as parts of Arizona and Nevada, including Las Vegas. Further, it awakened many people in Las Vegas with residents reporting dizziness and having trouble walking. The shaking from this seism was felt as far north as Carson City.

== Damage ==
Almost no damage was reported in the immediate area of the earthquake due to the remote location of the epicenter in the Mojave Desert. The Marine Corps Air Ground Combat Center Twentynine Palms, located in the Mojave Desert, contained the surface rupture of the Hector Mine earthquake. This did not cause extensive damage to the base. Two California highway bridges were also damaged. The biggest report of damage was a derailed westbound Amtrak Southwest Chief train which left rails split up and a total of twenty-one cars completely off the track. The train was traveling near the epicenter when the quake struck. The combined force of the quake and train caused several rails to come loose and fully derail parts of the train. The Amtrak train suffered repairable damage. There were no deaths; only minor injuries were reported, some of which needed treatment.

The earthquake did not affect human life on a large scale due to the time at which it occurred: 2:46am. Despite the large magnitude, damage to the area was limited due to the affected region being mostly desert and very sparsely populated. While the earthquake was primarily in the desert, movement could be felt through many parts of California, including Palm Springs.

== Aftermath ==
An examination of deformation following the earthquake reported horizontal and vertical motion of several millimeters on multiple faults in the vicinity. The 1999 Hector Mine earthquake resulted in segments of aftershocks in the nearby area. The most notable of them, due to their large magnitudes, occurred several kilometers both north and south to the main shock. These aftershocks were measured to be of magnitude 5.9 and 5.7 The earthquake and its aftershocks resulted in surface deformation of several millimeters vertically and horizontally on many of the surrounding pre-existing faults in the area. Again, due to the remote location of this earthquake's epicenter, no new precautions needed to be taken or implemented in the aftermath of the 1999 Hector Mine earthquake. However, this earthquake prompted further research into its precursor: the 1992 Landers earthquake which in the same area.

== See also ==
- 1992 Landers earthquake
- 2019 Ridgecrest earthquakes
- List of earthquakes in 1999
- List of earthquakes in California
- List of earthquakes in the United States
