= 1992 Landers earthquake =

Magnitude-7.3 tremor in California

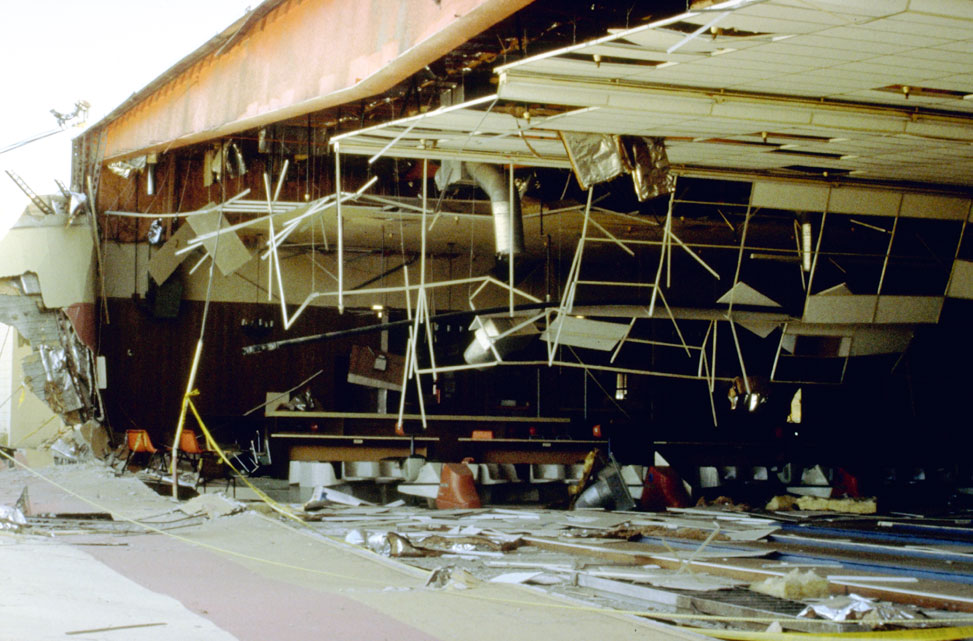
- Damage to the Yucca Lanes Bowling Center from the 1992 quake

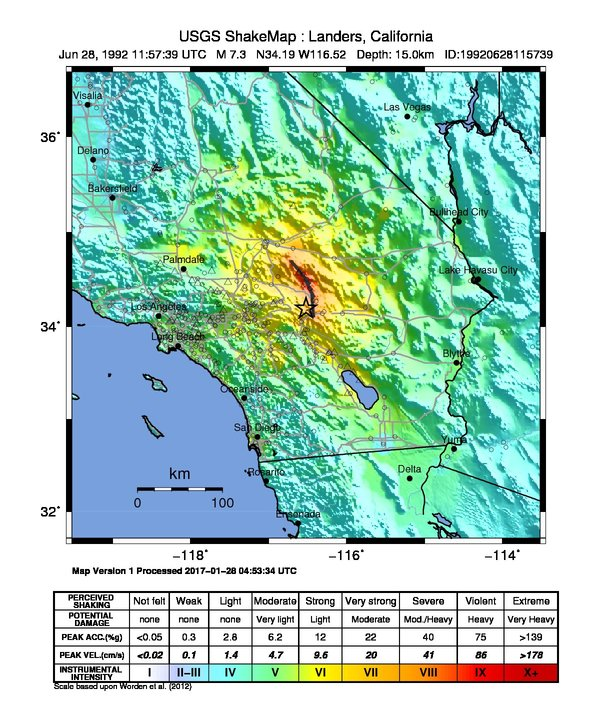
- USGS ShakeMap made for the event

- Location within California
- UTC time: 1992-06-28 11:57:35
- ISC event: 289086
- USGS-ANSS: ComCat
- Local date: June 28, 1992
- Local time: 4:57:35 am PDT
- Duration: 2−3 minutes
- Magnitude: 7.3 M_{w}
- Depth: 0.68 mi (1.09 km)
- Epicenter: 34.217°N 116.433°W
- Type: Strike-slip
- Areas affected: Southern California; United States
- Total damage: $92 million
- Max. intensity: MMI IX (Violent)
- Foreshocks: 6.1 M_{w} April 23 at 4:51
- Casualties: 3 killed 400+ injured

The 1992 Landers earthquake occurred on Sunday, June 28 with an epicenter near the town of Landers, California, in San Bernardino County. The shock had a moment magnitude of 7.3 and a maximum Mercalli intensity of IX (Violent).

== Earthquake ==
At 4:57 a.m. local time (11:57 UTC) on June 28, 1992, a magnitude 7.3 earthquake awoke much of Southern California. Though it turned out it was not the so-called "Big One" as many people would think, it was still a very strong earthquake. The shaking lasted for two to three minutes. Although this earthquake was much more powerful than the 1994 Northridge earthquake, the damage and loss of life were minimized by its location in the sparsely populated Mojave Desert.

The earthquake was a right-lateral strike-slip event, and involved the rupture of several different faults over a length of 75 to 85 km (47 to 53 mi). The names of those that were involved are the Johnson Valley, Kickapoo (also known as Landers), Homestead Valley, Homestead/Emerson, Emerson Valley and Camp Rock faults.

The surface rupture extended for 70 km (43 mi), with a maximum horizontal displacement of 5.5 m (18 ft) and a maximum vertical displacement of 1.8 m (5.9 ft).

=== Damage ===
Damage to the area directly surrounding the epicenter was severe. Roads were buckled. Buildings and chimneys collapsed. There were also large surface fissures. To the west in the Los Angeles Basin damage was much less severe. The majority of the damage in the Los Angeles area involved items that had fallen off shelves. Unlike the 1994 Northridge earthquake nineteen and a half months later, no freeway bridges collapsed because of the epicenter's remote location. Electricity was cut to thousands of residents but was generally restored within two to three hours. There was also some damage to homes from water displaced from swimming pools.

Loss of life in this earthquake was minimal. Two people died as a result of heart attacks, and a 3-year-old boy from Massachusetts, who was visiting Yucca Valley with his parents, died when bricks from a chimney collapsed into a living room where he was sleeping. More than 400 people sustained injuries as a result of the earthquake.

=== Related events ===
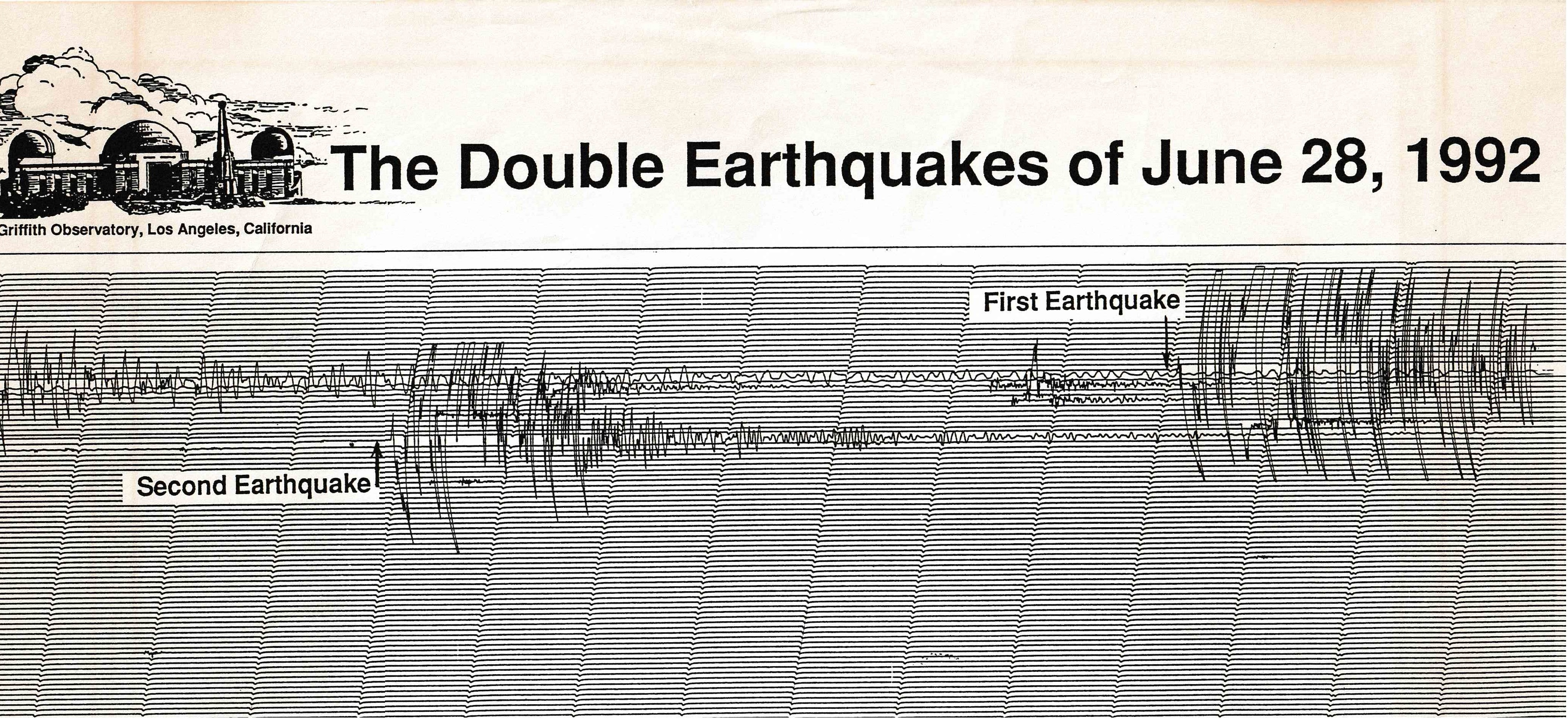
Recording of the June 28 earthquakes on a seismograph at Griffith Observatory

The quake was preceded by the 6.1 magnitude Joshua Tree earthquake at 4:51 on April 23, 1992 (UTC), which was south of the future Landers epicenter. The 6.5 magnitude Big Bear earthquake, which hit about three hours after the Landers mainshock, was originally considered an aftershock. However, the United States Geological Survey determined that this was a separate, but related, earthquake. These two earthquakes are considered a regional earthquake sequence, rather than a main shock and aftershock.

The magnitude 5.7 Little Skull Mountain (LSM) earthquake the following day, June 29, 1992, at 10:14 UTC near Yucca Mountain, Nevada, is also considered part of the regional sequence and may have been triggered by surface wave energy produced by the Landers earthquake. Foreshock activity, in the form of a significant increase in micro-earthquakes, was observed at Little Skull Mountain following the Landers earthquake, and the activity continued until the main LSM earthquake.

=== Theories ===
The Landers earthquake and the other large quakes associated with it in the Mojave region have been attributed to two possible long-term trends. One of these is that the San Andreas Fault may be in the process of being replaced as the plate boundary (between the North American plate and the Pacific plate) by a new trend across the Mojave and east of the Sierra Nevada Mountains. The other is that these quakes were a manifestation of the propagation of rifting coming up from the Gulf of California.

== In popular culture ==
The earthquake is featured in the television documentary series produced by GRB Entertainment, aired on The Learning Channel and other television channels around the world, about natural disasters titled Earth's Fury (also known internationally as Anatomy of Disaster) in an episode entitled "Earthquake!"

== See also ==
- List of earthquakes in 1992
- List of earthquakes in California
- List of earthquakes in the United States
- 1999 Hector Mine earthquake
- 2010 Baja California earthquake
- 2019 Ridgecrest earthquakes
