= Geology of Alabama =

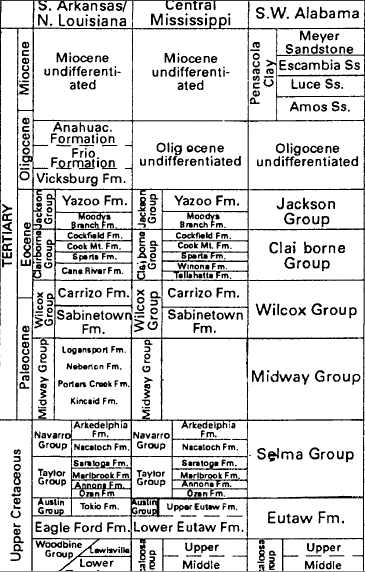
Arkansas, Louisiana, Mississippian and Alabama stratigraphic column

The geology of Alabama is marked by abundant geologic resources and a variety of geologic structures from folded mountains in the north to sandy beaches along the Gulf of Mexico coast. Alabama spans three continental geologic provinces as defined by the United States Geological Survey, the Atlantic Plain, Appalachian Highlands, and Interior Plains. The Geological Survey of Alabama breaks these provinces down into more specific physiographic provinces. Most of the rocks come from the Paleozoic age while some were created in the Holocene age nearly 1800 years ago, which can be considered "fairly recent"

== Provinces ==
=== East Gulf Coastal Plain ===
The broad, flat coastal plain stretches across the southern portion of the state, extending north from the Gulf coast to the Fall Line near Montgomery, Alabama.

=== Appalachian Highlands ===
Extending north from the Fall Line to far northern Alabama, the Appalachian Highlands encompass the hills, valleys, mountains, and plateaus that make up the southern extent of the Appalachian Mountains. This province is further subdivided into the Piedmont, Valley and Ridge, and Appalachian Plateaus provinces.

=== Interior Plains ===
Extreme north Alabama marks the southeast border of the Interior Plains province, characterized by flat or gently rolling terrain. In Alabama, this province generally lies north of the Tennessee River. This province is further divided into the Interior Low Plateaus province.

== Seismology ==
Alabama experiences frequent small earthquakes detectable only by instruments, and occasional moderate earthquakes large enough to be felt over a wide area and resulting in minor damage. The largest earthquake in recorded Alabama history measured an estimated magnitude of 5.1 and occurred October 18, 1916 near Irondale, and resulted in widespread panic, damage to structures, and dramatic changes in water well levels. Since 1886, slightly more than 10 percent of earthquakes with an epicenter in Alabama have been an estimated magnitude 3 or greater. The April 29, 2003 earthquake centered near Fort Payne, Alabama was felt over a wide area and received extensive media coverage.

Two fault zones are found in Alabama, the Southern Appalachian seismic zone (also known as the Eastern Tennessee seismic zone) in northeast and central Alabama, and the Bahamas Fracture seismic zone in southwest Alabama. Alabama also lies within the influence of the New Madrid seismic zone and the South Carolina seismic zone, earthquakes in those zones have resulted in damage in Alabama. The northeast corner of the state is subject to the greatest peak accelerations due to the presence of the East Tennessee seismic zone.

== Natural resources ==
Alabama's abundant natural mineral resources include commercially viable deposits of coal, oil, natural gas, and various minerals such as limestone and marble. The Cahaba Basin and Black Warrior Basin in central Alabama produce coalbed methane. Extensive oil and gas deposits have been developed in the southern portion of the state, Mobile Bay, and coastal state waters.

The first scientific reports of Alabama's geology were made during field studies by R. T. Brumby in the late 1830s and Sir Charles Lyell in the early 1840s. Michael Tuomey, appointed state geologist in 1847, completed a Geological Map of Alabama and in 1849 and published the first of two comprehensive reports on the state's resources a year later. These publications did much to quantify the mineral wealth of the Birmingham District and helped establish the region's early iron industry. Tuomey was succeeded by Eugene Allen Smith, who built on the initial researches to establish the geological history of the state.

== Meteor crater ==
A meteor crater over five miles in diameter was identified near Wetumpka, Alabama in 1969–1970. Conclusive evidence of the origin of the Wetumpka Impact Crater was found by Auburn University geology professor David T. King in 1998.

== See also ==
- Geology of the Appalachians
- Geology of the United States
