= 1973 Knoxville earthquake =

Earthquake in Tennessee, United States

- Location within Tennessee
- UTC time: 1973-11-30 07:48:41
- USGS-ANSS: ComCat
- Local date: 30 November 1973
- Local time: 02:48:41 EST (UTC-5)
- Magnitude: 4.7 mb
- Depth: 3.0 km (2 mi)
- Epicenter: 35.799°N 83.962°W
- Areas affected: Tennessee, United States
- Max. intensity: MMI VI (Strong)
- Foreshocks: M_{w} 3.4
- Aftershocks: 30+

On 30 November 1973, at 07:48 UTC (02:48 EST), a mb4.7 earthquake struck 1 km (0.62 mi) north-east of Alcoa, in the U.S. state of Tennessee. The earthquake was felt 2,100 km^{2} (810 sq mi) in the area. It was the most powerful known earthquake generated by the Eastern Tennessee seismic zone.

== Tectonic setting ==
The Eastern Tennessee seismic zone is located far from edge of the North American Plate and represents a mid-continent or intraplate earthquake zone. The known faults in the Eastern Tennessee seismic zone are generally ancient; no known active faults reach the surface. Research published in 2010 indicates a correlation between the Eastern Tennessee seismic zone and the New York–Alabama Lineament and suggests that earthquakes in the seismic zone originate at depth in metasedimentary gneiss.

== Earthquake ==
The United States Geological Survey (USGS) reported a moment magnitude of 4.6 and a focal depth of 3.0 km (1.9 mi) for the earthquake. It had a maximum Modified Mercalli intensity of VI (Strong). A magnitude 3.4 foreshock struck 1 month before the mainshock. More than 30 aftershocks were recorded after the mainshock.

The focal mechanism of the mainshock indicated primarily dip-slip faulting, but the data were too sparse to accurately define the direction of the motion. However, based on other data (trend of epicenters, vertical distribution of hypocenters, regional in situ stress measurements), a northwest-striking reverse fault is interpreted as the most likely causal fault. A detailed intensity survey revealed a felt area of 65,000 km^{2} (25,000 sq mi) that exhibited a rapid decrease of intensity to the north and unusually low decrease of macroseismic effects to the south. Topographic focusing of seismic energy is suggested by the intensity data for the town of Maryville, Tennessee.
