= 2011 Virginia earthquake =

5.8 Magnitude Earthquake in Virginia, U.S.

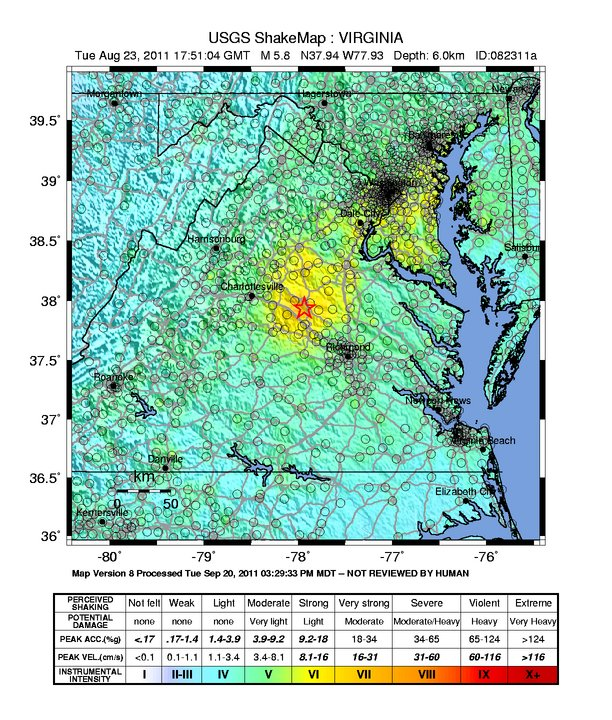
- Shake map

- Location within Virginia Location within the United States
- UTC time: 2011-08-23 17:51:04
- ISC event: 17331323
- USGS-ANSS: ComCat
- Local date: August 23, 2011, Tuesday
- Local time: 1:51:04 p.m. EDT
- Magnitude: 5.8 M_{w}
- Depth: 6 km (4 mi)
- Epicenter: 37°56′10″N 77°55′59″W
- Type: Dip-slip (reverse)
- Areas affected: Canada, United States
- Max. intensity: MMI VIII (Severe)
- Peak acceleration: 0.26 g
- Casualties: Several injured

On August 23, 2011, a magnitude 5.8 earthquake hit the Piedmont region of the U.S. state of Virginia at 1:51:04 p.m. EDT. The epicenter, in Louisa County, was 38 mi (61 km) northwest of Richmond and 5 mi (8 km) south-southwest of the town of Mineral. It was an intraplate earthquake with a maximum perceived intensity of VIII (Severe) on the Mercalli intensity scale. Several aftershocks, ranging up to 4.5 M_{w} in magnitude, occurred after the main tremor.

The quake was felt across more than a dozen U.S. states and in several Canadian provinces, and was felt by more people than any other quake in U.S. history. No deaths and only minor injuries were reported. Minor and moderate damage to buildings was widespread and was estimated by one risk-modeling company at $200 million to $300 million, of which about $100 million was insured.

The earthquake prompted research that revealed that the farthest landslide from the epicenter was 150 miles (240 km), by far the greatest landslide distance recorded from an earthquake of similar magnitude. Previous studies of worldwide earthquakes indicated that landslides occurred no farther than 36 miles (58 km) from the epicenter of a magnitude 5.8 earthquake. The Virginia earthquake study suggested that the added information about East Coast earthquakes may prompt a revision of equations that predict ground shaking.

== Geology ==
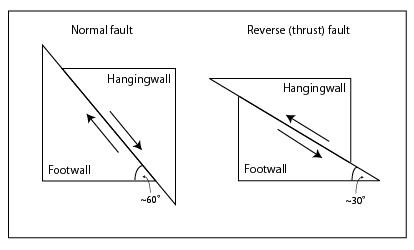
Cross-sectional illustration of normal and reverse dip-slip faults

The earthquake occurred in the Virginia seismic zone, located in the Piedmont region. The Virginia Piedmont area was formed originally as part of a zone of repeated continental collisions that created the ancestral Appalachian Mountains, a process that started during the Ordovician period with the Taconic orogeny and finished during the Carboniferous Period with the Alleghanian orogeny. The reverse faults formed during the various orogenies were partly reactivated as normal faults in extension during the Mesozoic Era as the supercontinent Pangaea broke apart. During the Cenozoic Era, compression from the opening and spreading of the Atlantic has caused some of these structures to be reactivated in a reverse sense.

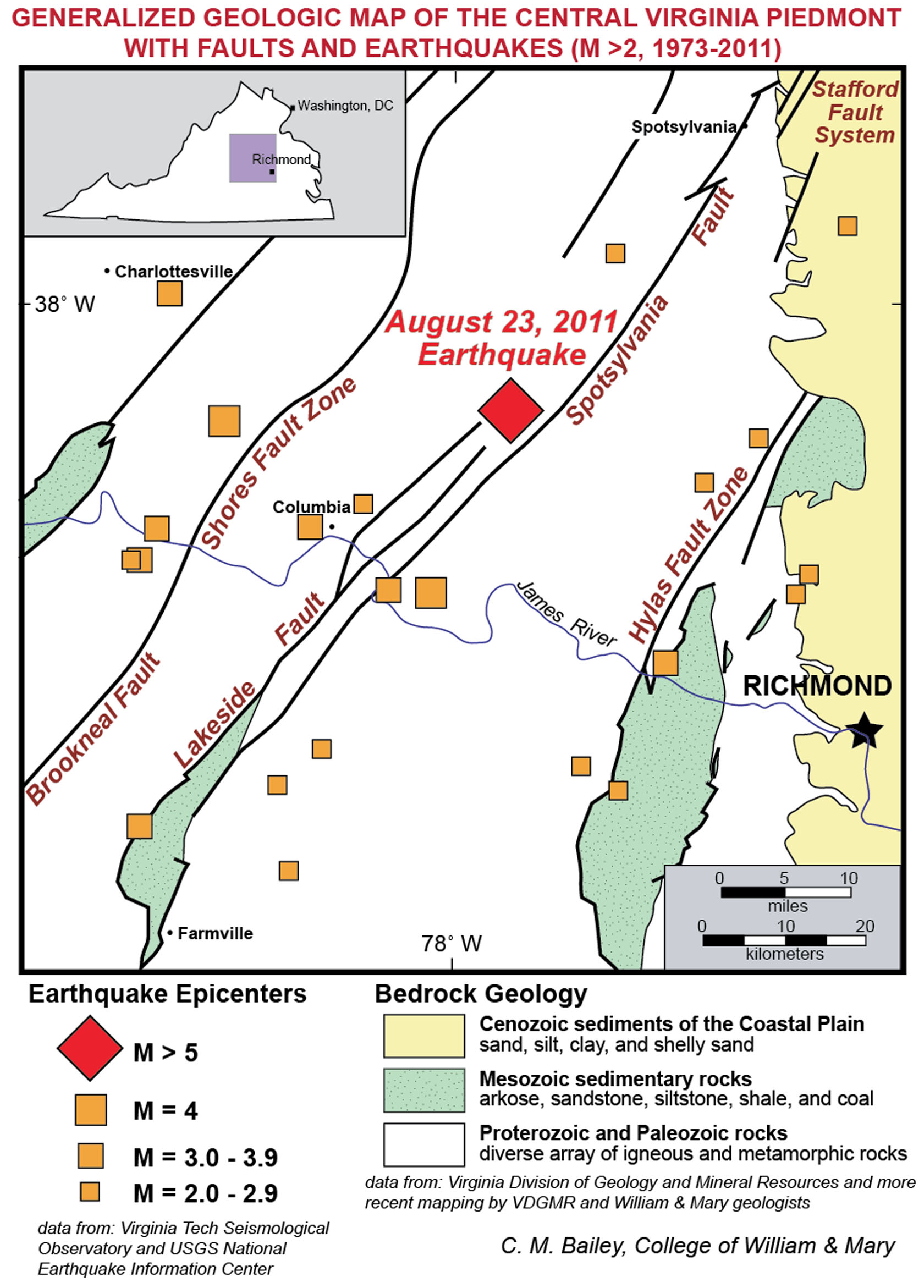
Generalized geologic map of the central Virginia Piedmont with faults and earthquakes (M>2, 1973–2011)

The earthquake's epicenter and most of the aftershocks lie between the surface traces of two structures, the Spotsylvania Fault, a southeast dipping zone of high ductile strain, and the Chopawamsic Fault, a thrust fault. The earthquake's focal mechanism shows reverse slip faulting on a north to northeast striking fault plane. The spatial distribution of aftershocks show that the causative fault dips to the southeast at 50–55°. There was no surface faulting associated with the earthquake. The size of the rupture is as yet uncalculated, but similar quakes have been caused by slippage along fault segments that are 5 to 15 km (3 to 9 mi) long.

After the earthquake, several websites speculated about whether hydraulic fracturing (fracking) for natural gas production could have caused or contributed to the quake. There were not any fracking operations in Virginia at the time of the quake. The nearest fracking was occurring in the Marcellus shale in West Virginia.

== Aftershocks ==
Numerous aftershocks occurred after the main tremor. The first four (of magnitude 2.8, 2.2, 4.2 and 3.4) occurred within 12 hours of the main shock. A 2.5-magnitude shock occurred just after midnight on August 25, followed at 05:07 UTC by the strongest, a magnitude 4.5 aftershock that woke many residents in Northern Virginia and Washington, D.C., and was felt as far away as New England, Georgia, and Illinois.

== Research ==
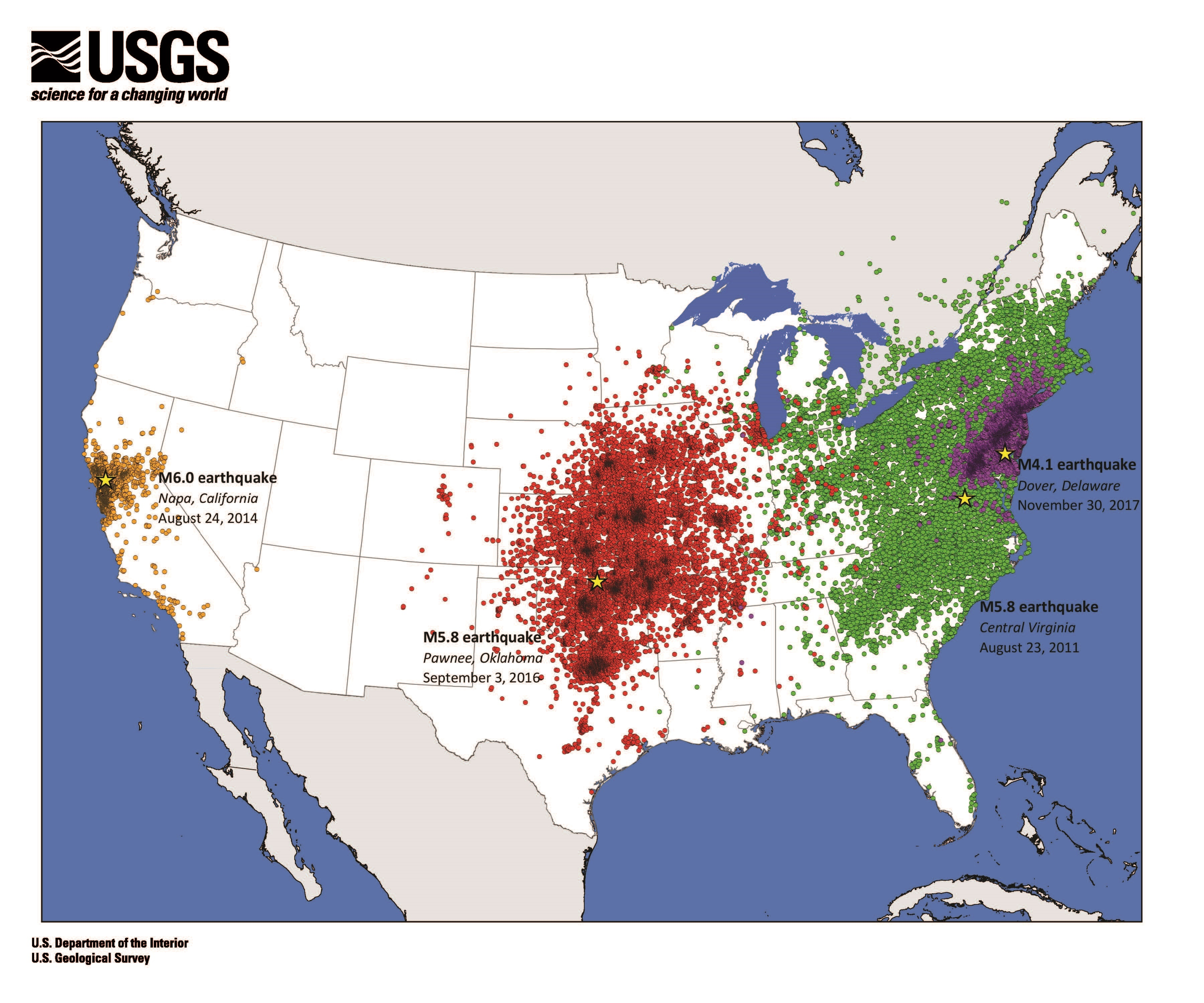
This map shows that East Coast earthquakes travel much farther than West Coast earthquakes of similar magnitude.

Scientists have known that the difference between seismic shaking in eastern North America versus western North America is due in part to the geologic structure and rock properties that allow seismic waves in the East to travel farther without weakening, but during November 2012, the USGS announced that recent research showed that earthquake shaking in the eastern United States can travel much farther and cause damage over larger areas than previously thought. USGS scientists found that the Virginia earthquake caused landslides at distances four times farther—and over an area 20 times larger—than previous research had shown. USGS Director Marcia McNutt said, "Scientists are confirming with empirical data what more than 50 million people in the eastern U.S. experienced firsthand: this was one powerful earthquake. Calibrating the distance over which landslides occur may also help us reach back into the geologic record to look for evidence of past major earthquakes from the Virginia seismic zone."

The USGS found that the farthest landslide from the 2011 Virginia earthquake was 150 miles (240 km) from the epicenter, along the Blue Ridge Parkway near Virginia's border with North Carolina. This is by far the greatest landslide distance recorded from any other earthquake of similar magnitude. Previous studies of worldwide earthquakes indicated that landslides occurred no farther than 36 miles (58 km) from the epicenter of a magnitude 5.8 earthquake. The study suggested that the added information about East Coast earthquakes may prompt a revision of equations that predict ground shaking. Study author Randall Jibson said, "what makes this new study so unique is that it provides direct observational evidence from the largest earthquake to occur in more than 100 years in the eastern U.S. Now that we know more about the power of East Coast earthquakes, equations that predict ground shaking might need to be revised."

The earthquake, along with a magnitude-5.8 quake on the border of New York and Ontario in 1944, is the largest to have occurred in the U.S. east of the Rocky Mountains since an 1897 quake centered in Giles County in western Virginia whose magnitude has been estimated as 5.8 or 5.9.

In addition to the great landslide distances recorded, the landslides from the 2011 Virginia earthquake occurred in an area 20 times larger than expected from studies of worldwide earthquakes. Scientists plotted the landslide locations that were farthest out and then calculated the area enclosed by those landslides. The observed landslides from the Virginia earthquake enclose an area of about 33,400 km^{2} (12,900 sq mi), while previous studies indicated an expected area of about 1,500 km^{2} (580 sq mi) from an earthquake of similar magnitude.

== Effect ==
It is estimated that approximately one-third of the U.S. population might have felt the earthquake, more than any other earthquake in U.S. history. People in certain areas of Pennsylvania, however, did not feel the earthquake at all despite being relatively close to the epicenter. About 148,000 people reported their ground-shaking experiences caused by the earthquake on the USGS "Did You Feel It?" website. Tremors from the Virginia earthquake were felt as far south as Atlanta, Georgia; as far north as Quebec City, Quebec; as far west as Illinois and as far east as Fredericton, New Brunswick, with damage reported as far away as Brooklyn, New York.

Although earthquakes in the central and eastern U.S. are substantially less frequent than in the western U.S., they are typically felt over a much broader region. East of the Rocky Mountains, an earthquake can be felt over an area as much as ten times larger than a similar magnitude earthquake on the west coast. Western rock is relatively young, therefore it absorbs much of the shaking caused by earthquakes. Hence, western earthquakes result in intense shaking close to the epicenter, but fade more quickly the farther the earthquakes travel. In the eastern United States, the rock is much older, and earthquake energy can therefore spread farther and have a greater impact. A magnitude 5.5 eastern U.S. earthquake can usually be felt as far as 300 mi (500 km) from its origin, and sometimes causes damage as far away as 25 mi (40 km). The relatively shallow depth of this earthquake also contributed to its widespread effects.

=== United States ===
Soon after the earthquake, the U.S. Federal Aviation Administration ordered a ground stop along the East Coast, causing some flight delays. The air traffic control tower at John F. Kennedy International Airport was evacuated. Flights were delayed at several airports, including Charlottesville–Albemarle Airport, John F. Kennedy International Airport, Newark Liberty International Airport, Ronald Reagan Washington National Airport, Dulles International Airport, Richmond International Airport, and Philadelphia International Airport. At Ronald Reagan National Airport, ceiling tiles fell in one terminal, and flights were halted.

A huge increase of cell-phone calls immediately after the event congested the AT&T, Verizon Wireless, Sprint Nextel, T-Mobile USA, and Frontier Communications networks in the Mid-Atlantic region, causing disruptions and loss of service for as much as an hour after the earthquake.

==== Virginia ====
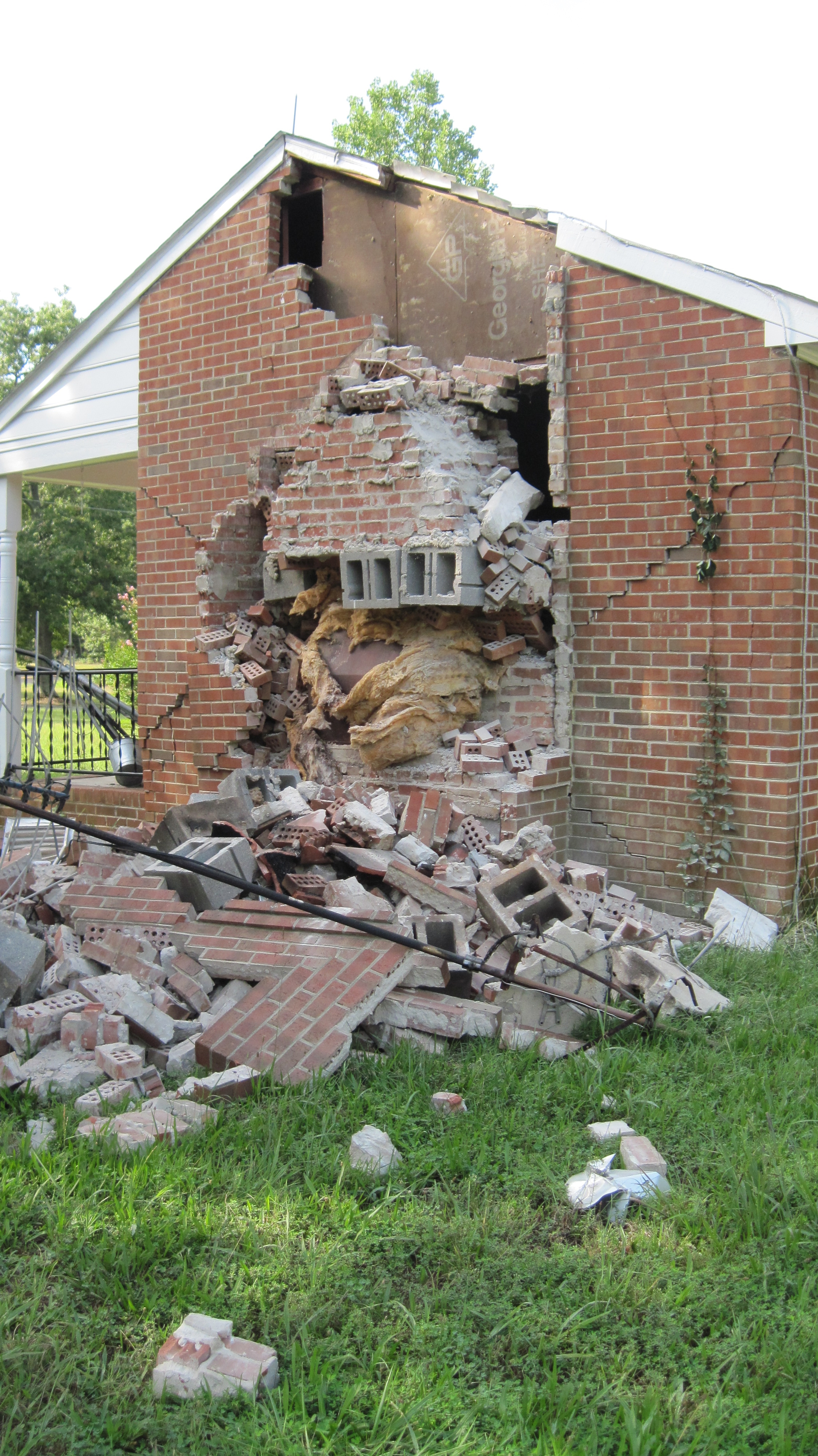
Chimney damage at a house in Louisa County, Virginia

The epicenter of the earthquake was in Louisa County, Virginia, where damage was greatest and several minor injuries occurred. The town of Mineral, located 5 mi (8 km) north-northeast from the earthquake's epicenter, reported the collapse of two buildings, as well as minor damage to several other structures, including the collapse of the ceiling in its Town Hall. Only minor injuries were reported, including the hospitalization of several people reporting chest pains related to the stress of the experience. Fallen chimneys and other structural damage to buildings was also reported in Louisa, the county seat. The Gilboa Christian Church, in Cuckoo, built in 1832, was heavily damaged and rendered unusable; while its cemetery's vertical standing tombstones were toppled and razed to the ground. At Louisa County High School, cinderblocks fell in classrooms, and cracks were seen in walls. Six students had minor injuries. Louisa County schools were closed on August 24 while engineers assessed damage to school buildings. The high school and Thomas Jefferson Elementary were closed for the remainder of the school year. Inspections revealed that 65 homes sustained major or severe damage and 125 homes experienced mild to moderate damage. Damage in Louisa County was estimated at $80.6 million, of which $63.8 million was from damage to public school buildings and $14.7 million was from damage to residences. On August 25, county officials declared a state of local emergency in order to allow them to request state aid.

Multiple reactor sensors at the North Anna Nuclear Generating Station, located 10 mi (16 km) northeast of the epicenter, detected a slight power reduction as a result of vibrations in the reactor or monitoring devices. This caused the two nuclear reactors to shut down automatically seconds before off-site power was lost. Amid public fears that the earthquake could cause a nuclear accident, prompted in part by the Fukushima disaster which had occurred six months prior, the Nuclear Regulatory Commission sent additional inspectors to the Virginia plant after preliminary measurements suggested that the ground shook more than the two reactors were designed to handle. The damage was minimal and the NRC advised that further inspections should not be interpreted to mean that the plant was not safe. After a $21 million inspection, engineers stated that they only found cosmetic damage. On November 11, 2011, the NRC gave its approval for restarting the reactors.

In Charlottesville, about 27 mi (43 km) west of the epicenter, a gas leak closed several streets, including West Main Street.

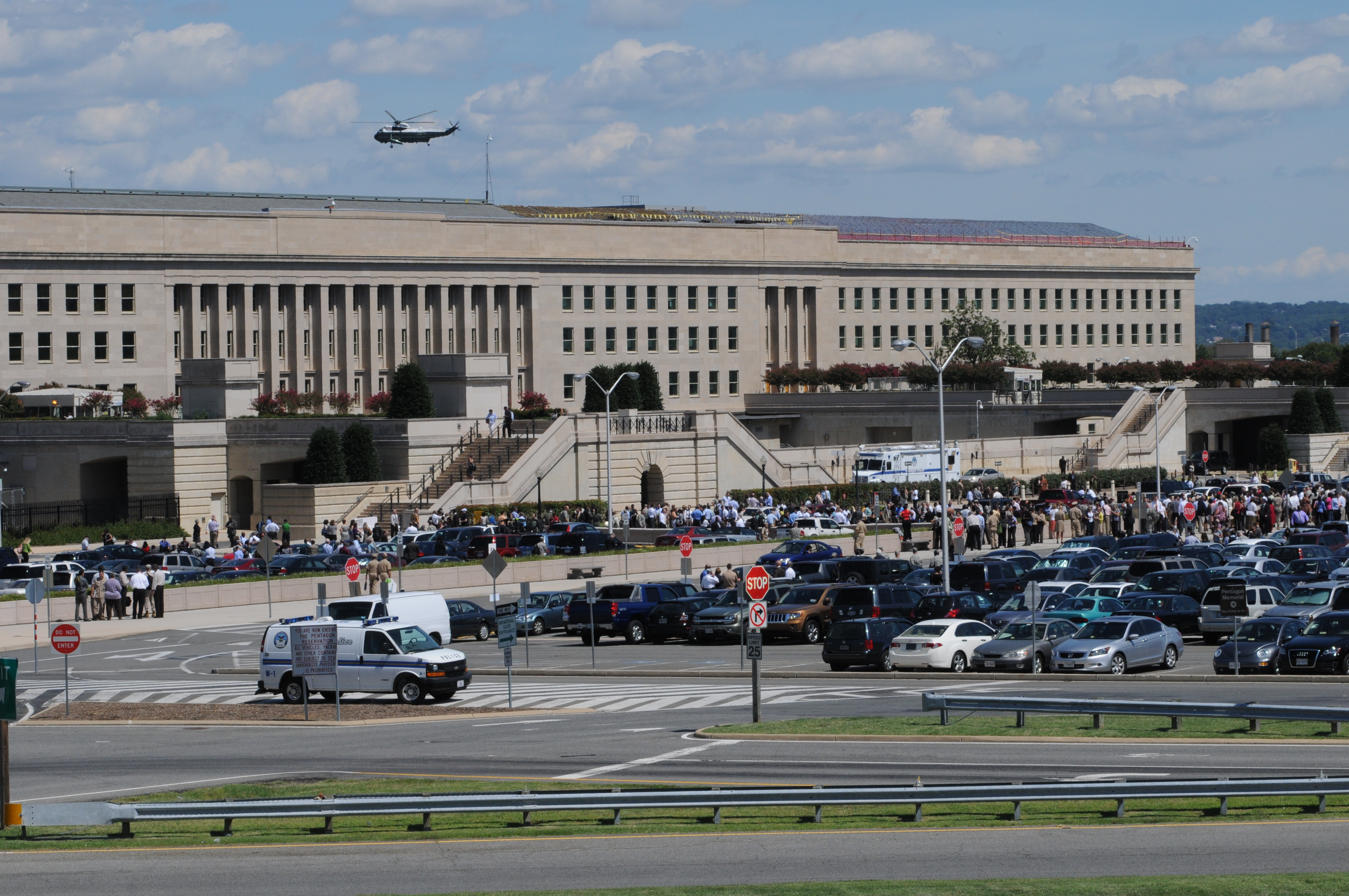
Some employees evacuated the Pentagon moments after the earthquake.

In Spotsylvania County, the August 24 opening of public schools was delayed while damage to buildings was assessed. Six patients were treated at the Spotsylvania Regional Medical Center for minor injuries resulting from the earthquake.

Several buildings in Culpeper, about 37 mi (60 km) north of the epicenter, sustained structural damage. The brick façade of the Levy Building, built during 1848, collapsed and the building was condemned and demolished. The walls of St. Stephen's Episcopal Church, constructed during 1821, buckled and were deemed unstable by town officials. Another church, Culpeper Baptist Church, built during 1894, lost its chimney. Schools in Culpeper County delayed their scheduled August 24 opening to assess damage to buildings. Two minor earthquake injuries were reported by the Culpeper Regional Hospital. Damage in Culpeper was estimated at $10 million.

In Fredericksburg, about 37 mi (60 km) northeast of the epicenter, the Dickinson Building on the campus of Germanna Community College was deemed unusable for the rest of the semester, and the whole college was closed until alternative classrooms could be found, re-opening on September 6. Also in Fredericksburg, a gas leak led to the evacuation of homes and businesses in a two-block radius. Officials estimated the damage total at around $711,000.

In Prince William County, approximately 59 miles (95 km) north of the epicenter, damage to the dam for Lake Jackson was documented by officials in May 2012 though local residents had noticed lower water levels in the lake in 2011. Most of the water in the lake was released to relieve pressure. The dam will be rehabilitated at a cost of approximately $900,000.

In Arlington County, a burst pipe flooded two corridors at the Pentagon. Employees, many of whom left the building when the earthquake was felt, were alerted to the flooding by an alarm system that was installed after the September 11 attacks. Arlington House, The Robert E. Lee Memorial, in Arlington National Cemetery experienced significant damage when the quake shifted the structure's back wall by a quarter of an inch, producing large cracks in the plaster and requiring the closure of the House's back hallway and second floor. The county's Thomas Jefferson Theater—home to a middle school auditorium and several community theatre groups—closed for several months due to damage to its stage area, including a shift of the masonry bearing walls and supports for its fly gallery and gridiron deck. The nearby City of Alexandria experienced damage to chimneys and/or other brickwork in Gadsby's Tavern, the Alexandria City Hall and other historic buildings.

Two spare replacement panels of the Vietnam Veterans memorial that were stored at Quantico Marine Base were knocked down and shattered.

==== Washington, D.C. ====
Security video in the Washington Monument during the earthquake. The earthquake occurs at the 1:44 mark.

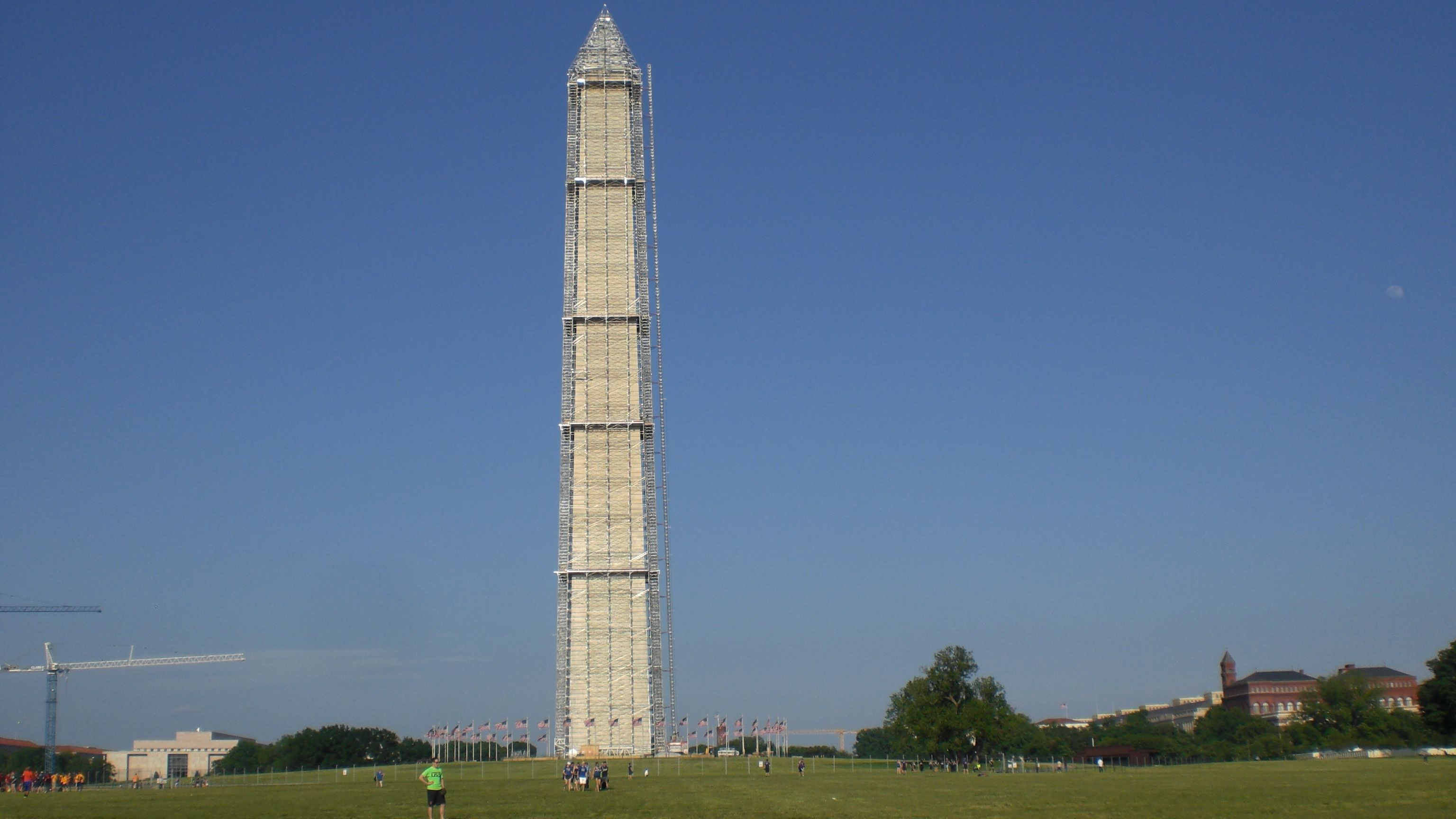
The Washington Monument was closed for almost three years to repair damage from the tremors.

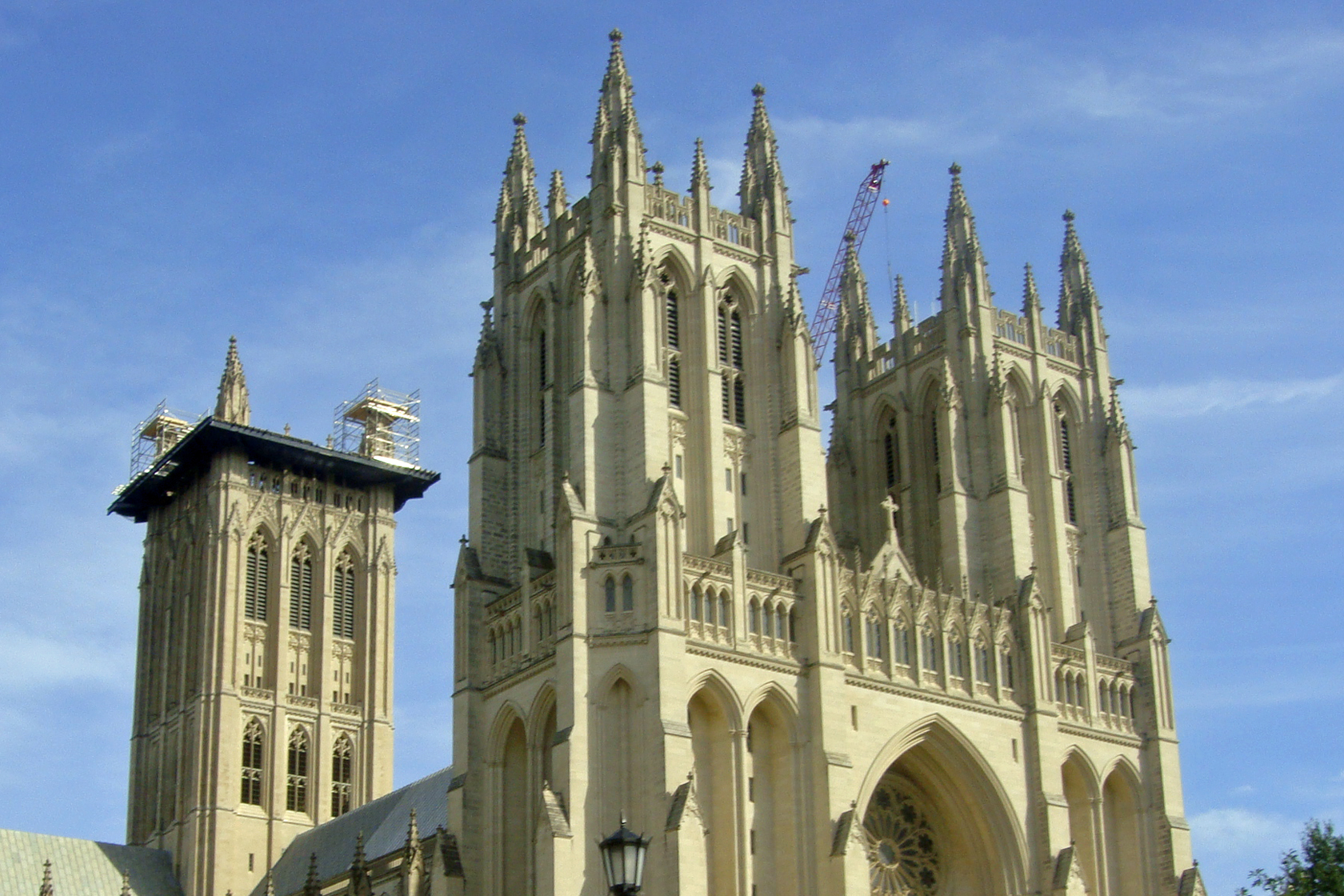
Stabilization work at the Washington National Cathedral due to damage caused by the earthquake

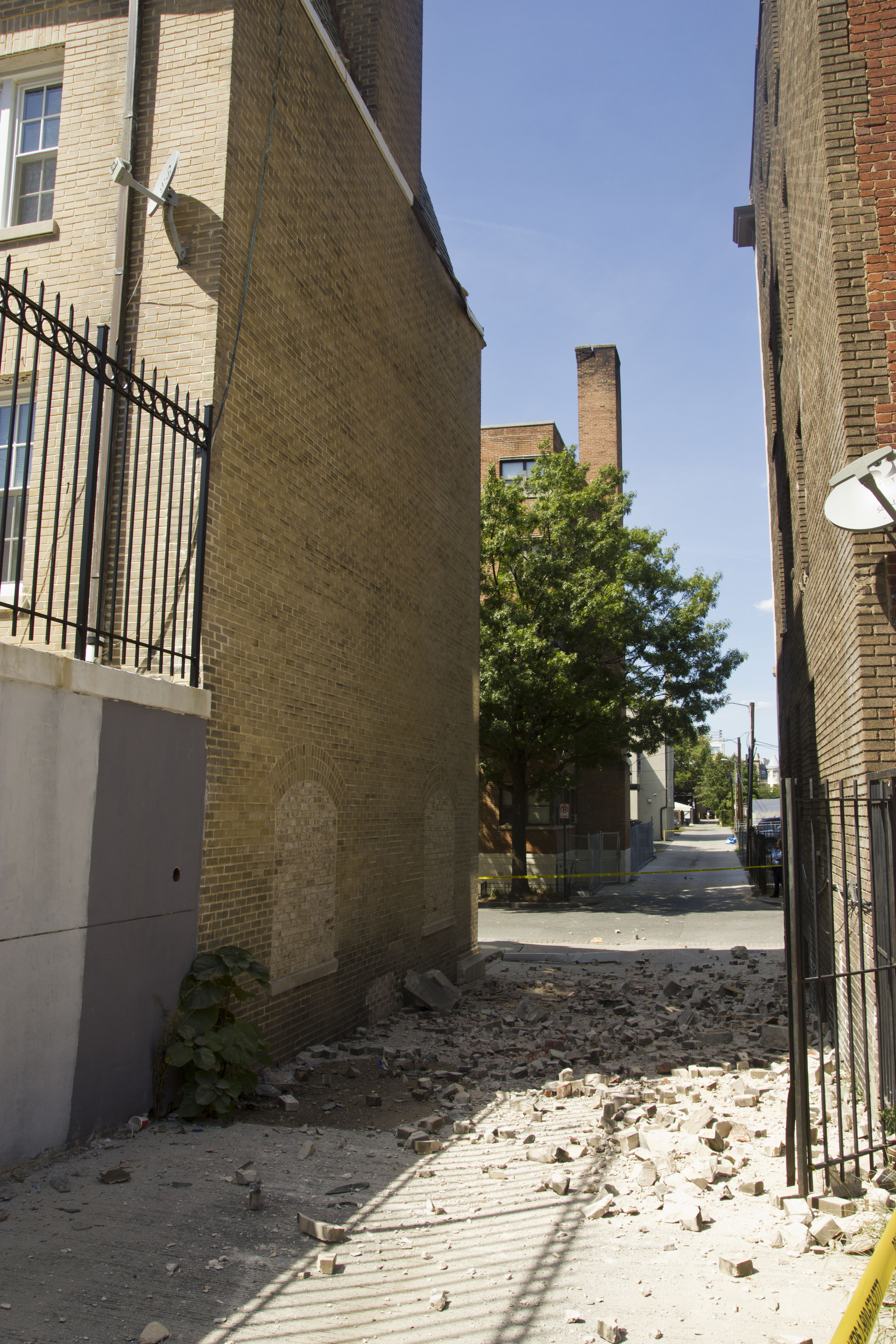
Damage to the Embassy of Ecuador

The White House, the Capitol, and various other buildings were evacuated. The afternoon traffic rush hour was affected, with some traffic lights inoperative, and the Washington Metro system's trains operated at reduced speeds while tracks and tunnels were inspected. District of Columbia Public Schools were shut down the day after while inspections of the schools were conducted.

A National Park Service spokesperson reported that surveys revealed cracks near the top of the Washington Monument, the world's tallest stone structure, which remained closed for repairs until May 2014. The earthquake severely damaged three of the four pinnacles (corner spires) on the central tower of the Washington National Cathedral, cracked some of its flying buttresses, and caused additional damage. As the cathedral's insurance policy did not cover earthquake damage, cathedral officials stated that they would need to raise millions of dollars to fully evaluate the damage and to stabilize and repair its limestone exterior. The Smithsonian Castle incurred damage to five decorative turrets, and fifty jars of preserved specimens fell from shelves at the Smithsonian's National Museum of Natural History. The Embassy of Ecuador suffered structural damage, including three collapsed chimneys and cracked internal walls. The Treasury Building suffered minor damage to exterior railings, some of which fell to the ground and caused closure of a sidewalk. Fire department officials in Washington reported numerous minor injuries as a result of the earthquake.

==== Other parts of the Mid-Atlantic region ====
In Wilmington, Delaware, blocks fell to the street from the steeple of St. Thomas the Apostle Church, and the New Castle County Courthouse was evacuated, as was the air traffic control tower of the New Castle County Airport in nearby Wilmington Manor. Fire marshals and building inspectors were called to assess structures throughout Dover, the capital city, where the city hall was evacuated. Numerous buildings in Georgetown, the Sussex County seat was evacuated while crews checked for damage; the Emergency Operations Center there reported 200 calls to 9-1-1. Delaware Department of Transportation crews were dispatched statewide to inspect interstate highways, the under-construction replacement Indian River Inlet Bridge, the Delaware Memorial Bridge on I-295, and other bridges and roads.

In Temple Hills, Maryland, residents were evacuated from two damaged apartment buildings. In Kensington, the tops of four spires on the Washington D.C. Temple of the Church of Jesus Christ of Latter-day Saints fell to the ground along with several pieces of marble from the façade. Near Brunswick, the earthquake caused "significant discoloration and a reduction in the quality of the water" of a spring, leading officials to warn against using the water until further notice. In the Fells Point neighborhood of Baltimore, St. Patrick Catholic Church was deemed unsafe and was scheduled to be closed for weeks for repairs. In Salisbury, the City Police station endured damage above doorways and in concrete block walls, and there was also minor cracking in classroom walls at Salisbury University. In Annapolis, several buildings at the United States Naval Academy were damaged. In Suitland, eight jars of preserved fish specimens fell from shelves at a Smithsonian Institution storage facility. The 1740 Mt. Calvert Mansion, a historic site and museum located on the Patuxent River in Upper Marlboro, received substantial structural damage and was closed indefinitely to the public.

In Martinsburg, West Virginia, several government buildings were evacuated, and multiple citizens reported feeling their homes shaking violently enough to rattle picture frames off the walls. In Charleston, the Kanawha County Courthouse, the West Virginia State Capitol campus, and several other downtown buildings were evacuated; Kanawha County dispatchers received more than 350 telephone calls in 45 minutes, but there were not any reports of damage to buildings and infrastructure other than minor plaster cracking in the old courthouse. In Philippi, part of a chimney collapsed at the Barbour County courthouse. The West Virginia Office of Miners' Health, Safety and Training stated that West Virginia coal mines were safe following the tremors. A roof collapse in Patriot Coal Company's Big Mountain Complex forced the closure of the mine.

Trembling was felt in buildings in Philadelphia, Pittsburgh, Altoona, Hollidaysburg, York, State College, Erie, Allentown, Reading, Harrisburg and elsewhere in Pennsylvania. Just before 2:00 p.m., in the midst of an opening game between New England and Europe in the Little League Baseball World Series, many people in South Williamsport experienced a ground shaking LLBWS first. Staffers at the Altoona Mirror evacuated their building after it shook for about 10 seconds from the tremor. They returned about 2:25 p.m. The third floor of the Blair County Courthouse in Hollidaysburg was evacuated but court sessions continued on the second floor. A house reportedly was moved off its foundation and its roof buckled in the Three Springs area, Huntingdon County Emergency Management Director Adam Miller said. A minor rockslide occurred on Route 453 near The Grier School in Birmingham. In Center City Philadelphia, a window shattered on a lower floor at the Independence Blue Cross building, and the company sent its 3,000 employees home for the day. Other office buildings in Center City Philadelphia were also evacuated soon after the earthquake. Workers at the PPL Corporation in Allentown evacuated the building. However, the Three Mile Island nuclear plant south of Harrisburg continued to operate during the earthquake. The Bucks County Courthouse in Doylestown was evacuated after the earthquake. In Philadelphia, SEPTA Regional Rail trains were restricted to a speed of 25 mph (40 km/h) while tracks were inspected for damage, and PATCO Speedline trains were briefly suspended, with no damage reported. The Pennsylvania Department of Transportation inspected bridges across the state for damage. The Delaware River Port Authority reported no damage to its four bridges across the Delaware River. Minor damage was also reported in the Pittsburgh area. In March 2013, a landfill in Williams Township, south of Easton, experienced a mudslide, closing a road for over nine months. The mudslide was caused by a cap slip, determined to be the result of the 2011 earthquake.

Damage in New Jersey was minor. The state Emergency Management office reported two gas leaks in Gloucester County. In Burlington, Temple B'nai Israel's synagogue building, built during 1801, sustained some water damage when tremor-caused openings in the roof allowed standing water to leak in, and about 20 bricks fell, damaging a congregant's car. In Camden, a vacant house partially collapsed, and government buildings were evacuated, with city workers given the option of returning home for the day. Due to the damage done by the quake, the municipal government of Woodbury reported that the historic Colonel George Gill Green Opera House, which was built during 1880, would be razed, but instead it was renovated to provide housing for senior citizens. No other infrastructure damage was reported in the state.

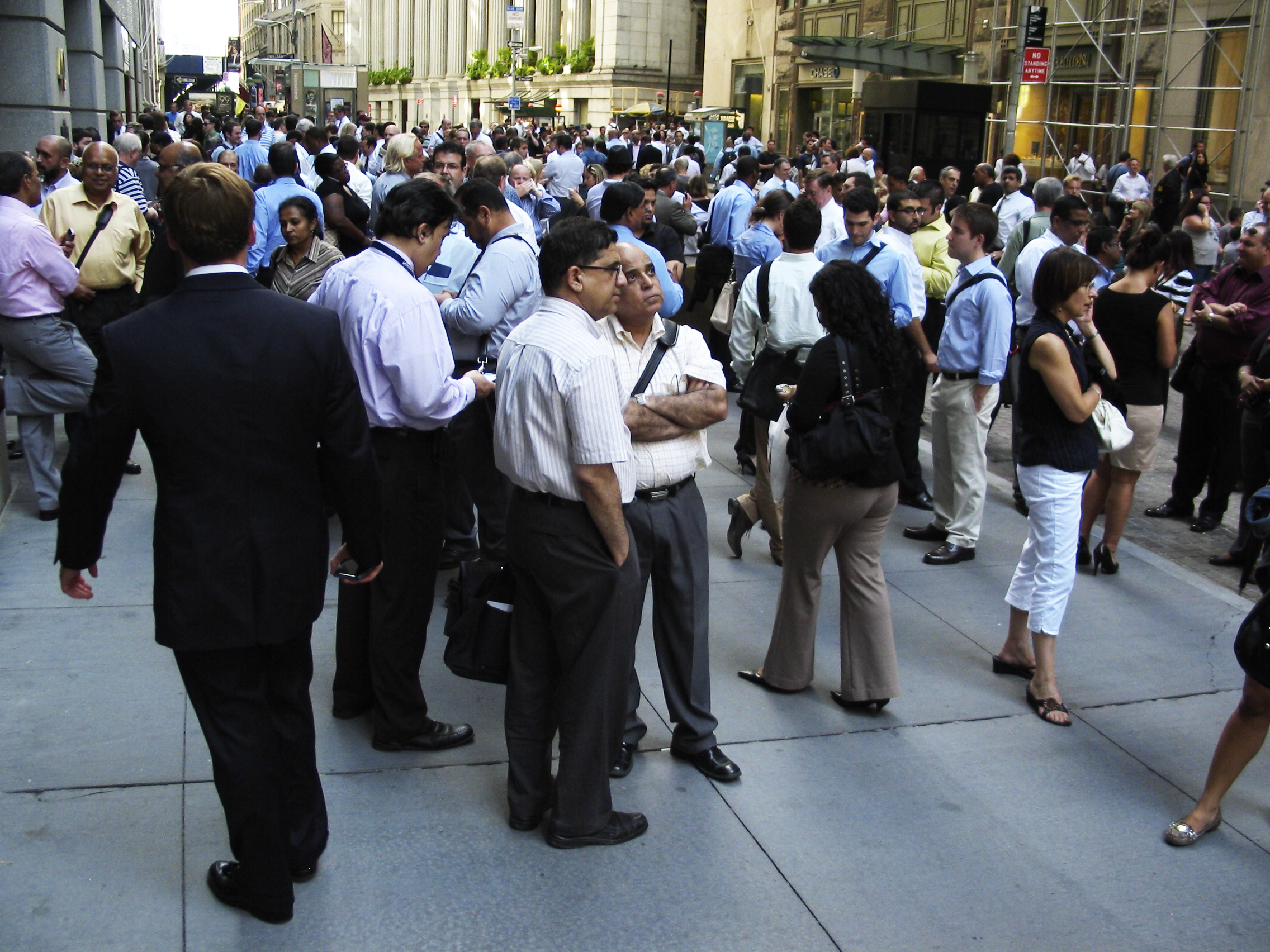
People gather outside 40 Wall Street in New York City after the earthquake

Tremors were felt to varying degrees throughout New York State, including by people in some buildings in Manhattan. Physical damage occurred in Brooklyn, where a chimney in Red Hook was toppled. There were some disruptions, including building evacuations and delays at airports. Amtrak train service at Penn Station was also delayed.

==== New England ====
The earthquake was felt throughout much of the six New England states. In New Haven, Connecticut, play at the 2011 New Haven Open at Yale tennis tournament was stopped for two hours and the main stadium was evacuated while the fire department checked it for damage. No damage or injuries were reported. In Boston, Massachusetts, the Massachusetts Emergency Management Agency reported tremors and swaying buildings but no damage. The U.S. District Court in South Boston was evacuated and the University of Massachusetts Boston closed early. In Maine, the earthquake was felt as far north as Augusta and Portland, but no damage was reported in the state.

==== Midwestern states ====
In Columbus, Ohio, the Huntington Center was briefly evacuated, and occupants on the upper floors of the Rhodes State Office Tower and the Vern Riffe State Office Tower reported feeling strong shaking. Evacuations also occurred in Canton and Akron. In Cleveland, the press box at Progressive Field shook during the third inning of a Cleveland Indians baseball game.

Tremors from the earthquake were felt as far north as Saginaw, Michigan, and as far west as communities on Lake Michigan. There were no reports of damage. USGS also listed reports of tremors from as far west as Illinois, Indiana, Wisconsin, and Minnesota.

==== Southern states ====
The earthquake was felt in several southern states as far from the epicenter as Alabama, Georgia, Florida, and Kentucky, but no damage was reported.

=== Canada ===
Tremors from the earthquake were also felt in eastern Canada, mostly in Southern Ontario, as well as in parts of southern Quebec and the Maritime provinces. In Ontario, a few buildings in Toronto were evacuated, and roads were closed as a precautionary measure in case of building collapse in Sudbury and Windsor. 2011 was the second consecutive year in which an earthquake was widely felt in Southern Ontario and Quebec, the previous being the June 2010 Central Canada earthquake that also affected that region.

== Internet activity and social media ==
The USGS "Did you feel it?" citizen-based earthquake intensity website received about 60,000 reports in the first two hours after the quake, and over 100,000 responses within four hours. As of March 7, 2018, the earthquake has 144,178 felt reports.

According to Facebook, the word "earthquake" appeared in the status updates of 3 million users within four minutes of the quake. Twitter said users were sending as many as 5,500 messages ("tweets") per second, which exceeds the maximum rate immediately after the death of Osama bin Laden and was "on par with" the rate after the Tōhoku earthquake and tsunami.

Due to the significantly slower propagation of seismic waves compared to the near-speed-of-light transmission of Internet traffic, some Twitter users read about the earthquake seconds before feeling the tremors. For example, Twitter users in such cities as New York City and Boston reported reading tweets about the earthquake from users in Washington, D.C., or Richmond, Virginia, 15 to 30 seconds before feeling the quake itself.

The European-Mediterranean Seismological Centre (EMSC) website, one of the top global earthquake information website experienced a massive and immediate traffic surge caused by the convergence of eyewitnesses looking for information about the shaking. Their hit times proved to mimic the seismic wave propagation generated by the earthquake. On average eyewitnesses hit the website 90 seconds after the ground start shaking. The epicenter was determined within 30 km by retropropagating 2 minutes of EMSC website traffic without using any seismic data. The authors argue that eyewitnesses can be considered as a real-time sensor, their website visit being triggered by the ground shaking.

The English version of Wikipedia had an encyclopedia article dedicated to the earthquake by 2:03 p.m., 12 minutes after the event, and it was mentioned in two other Wikipedia articles even earlier.

== Zoo animal reactions ==
Staff at the National Zoo in Washington, D.C., reported that some of the animals in the park appeared to show behavior suggesting that they anticipated the earthquake from seconds to minutes before it was felt in the area. The earthquake was felt at the great ape exhibits during afternoon feeding time. About three to ten seconds before the quake, many of the apes abandoned their food and climbed to the top of a tree-like structure in the exhibit. The red ruffed lemurs sounded an alarm call about 15 minutes before the quake, and the flock of 64 flamingos rushed around and grouped themselves together just before the quake. During the quake, some animals vocalized, some ran or dived for cover, and some stood up and stared at the walls of their enclosures. Some of the animals remained agitated for the rest of the day, while others calmed quickly. The Zoo's giant pandas did not appear to respond to the quake.

== See also ==
- List of earthquakes in 2011
- List of earthquakes in the United States
- List of earthquakes in Virginia
