= Eastern Tennessee seismic zone =

Active earthquake zone in the eastern U.S.

The Eastern Tennessee seismic zone (ETSZ), also known as the East Tennessee seismic zone and the Southern Appalachian seismic zone, is a geographic band stretching from northeastern Alabama to southwestern Virginia that is subject to frequent small earthquakes. The ETSZ is one of the most active earthquake zones in the eastern United States.

== Seismicity ==
Most earthquakes in the ETSZ are small and are detected only with instruments. A few damaging earthquakes have occurred in the ETSZ; the largest historic earthquakes measured 5.1 magnitude, occurring in April 29, 2003 near Fort Payne, Alabama and August 9, 2020 near Sparta, North Carolina and most recently, occurring on May 10, 2025 near Greenback, Tennessee at 4.1 magnitude. Earthquakes large enough to be felt occur approximately once per year in the ETSZ. The United States Geological Survey estimates that earthquakes as large as magnitude 7.5 are possible in the ETSZ. Events of magnitude 5–6 are estimated to occur once every 200 to 300 years.

== Source ==
The source of seismic activity in the ETSZ is not known. The ETSZ is located far from edge of the North American plate and represents a mid-continent or intraplate earthquake zone. The known faults in the ETSZ are generally ancient; no known active faults reach the surface. Research published in 2010 indicates a correlation between the East Tennessee seismic zone and the New York–Alabama Lineament and suggests that earthquakes in the seismic zone originate at depth in metasedimentary gneiss.

== Seismic events ==
Earthquakes associated with the ETSZ have included:

- October 18, 1916, earthquake near Irondale, Alabama (magnitude 5.1)
- 1973 earthquake near Knoxville, Tennessee (magnitude 4.6)
- April 29, 2003, earthquake near Fort Payne, Alabama (magnitude 4.6)
- December 12, 2018, earthquake near Decatur, Tennessee (magnitude 4.4 with smaller aftershocks)
- August 9, 2020, earthquake near Sparta, North Carolina (magnitude 5.1 with smaller aftershocks)

== See also ==
- 1916 Irondale earthquake
- 1973 Knoxville earthquake
- Geology of Alabama
- Geology of Georgia
- Geology of Tennessee
- Geology of the Appalachians
- Virginia seismic zones
