= 1897 Giles County earthquake =

Earthquakes in Virginia

- USGS-ANSS: ComCat
- Local date: May 31, 1897
- Local time: 13:58 EST
- Magnitude: mb 5.8
- Epicenter: 37.3°N 80.7°W
- Areas affected: United States
- Max. intensity: MMI VIII (Severe)

An earthquake estimated at magnitude 5.8, struck Giles County, Virginia, on May 31, 1897, at 13:58 EST. It was one of the strongest recorded earthquakes in Virginia and the Eastern United States. While there were no casualties, the earthquake caused considerable damage to chimneys in Virginia and Tennessee, and was felt for 300,000 mi^{2} (780,000 km^{2}) across several states. The earthquake was likely the result of faulting in the Giles County seismic zone, where Precambrian to early Paleozoic normal faults related to the early formation of the Iapetus Ocean have been reactivated by present-day tectonic stresses within the North American plate.

== Earthquake ==
The earthquake struck on May 31, 1897, at 13:58 EST with an epicenter in Giles County, Virginia, near the border with West Virginia. Its estimated body-wave magnitude (mb) was 5.8. Its magnitude was close to that of the 2011 earthquake, making it one of the strongest in the state and Eastern United States.

=== Moment magnitude estimate ===
Seismologist Susan Hough compared the intensity distribution of the 1897 earthquake, based on historical records, and the 2011 earthquake, and concluded that the former event was smaller than moment magnitude (M_{w}) 5.8. Hough highlighted that the felt area of the 2011 earthquake extended farther west than during the 1897 earthquake despire the earlier quake having an epicenter west of the 2011 event. She also assigned intensity values for some reports of the earthquake based on the U.S. Geological Survey's Did You Feel It? (DYFI) citizen science questionnare used to crowdsource data for earthquake shaking intensity. Based on comparing the DYFI-informed data and implementing attenuation relation models, the computed earthquake size was M_{w} 5.5.

=== Intensity and damage ===
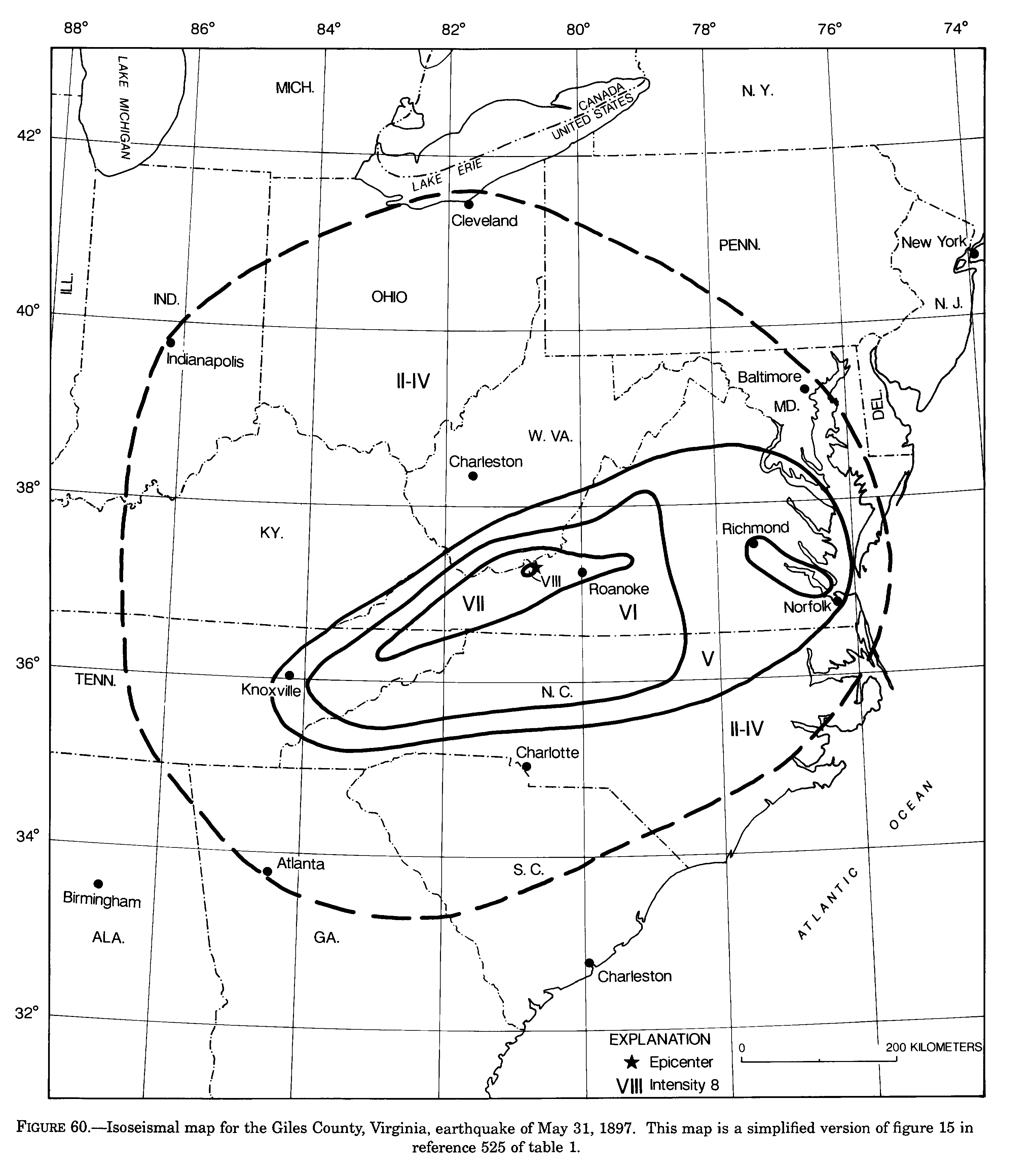
An isoseismal map for the mainshock by C. W. Stover and J. L. Coffman

The earthquake was felt across a wide area, as much as 300,000 mi^{2} (780,000 km^{2}). Reports of shaking extended far north as Cleveland, Ohio; and far south as Savannah, Georgia, where the intensity was II–IV (Light–Weak). Many reports of collapsed chimneys and "changes in the flow of springs" earned the shock maximum intensity of VII–VIII (Very Strong–Severe) on the Modified Mercalli intensity scale.

Isoseismal maps were prepared by G. A. Bollinger and Margaret G. Hopper in 1971, and Law Engineering Testing Company in 1975. Law Engineering's map, which used a larger dataset, was simplified by C. W. Stover's and J. L. Coffman's report in 1993. In the 1993 map, the meizoseismal area was assigned to a northeast-trending oblong area from Lynchburg, westwards to Bluefield (in West Virginia), and from southern Giles County to Bristol (in Tennessee). Intensity VIII was assigned to a small circular region near the epicenter while all contours of lower intensities generally feature a northeast trending axis. The intensity VI contour covers much of western Virginia, eastern Tennessee, and a small part of southern West Virginia. The intensity V isoseismal line extend approximately east–northeast from Norfolk, Virginia to Knoxville, Tennessee. Inside the intensity V contour, in the Piedmont, there is an isolated northwest-trending intensity VI area with Richmond at its northwest end.

Hopper's and Bollinger's map was based on interpreting qualitative first-hand and newspaper reports. In their map, a large portion of the southern half of Virginia, the northern half of North Carolina and a small area in West Virginia felt intensity VI (Strong) shaking. They concluded from descriptions of damage that the intensity in the epicenter area and Pearisburg did not exceed VIII. The shaking was weaker in the central Piedmont south of Winchester. However, in the neighboring coastal plain, there was an isolated area of stronger shaking. The intensity V (Moderate) isoseismal line is drawn roughly parallel to the intensity VI isoseismal line, and is assigned to an area extending along the Ohio River Valley northwards to Cincinnati. The IV and III contours lines are drawn past most of West Virginia and Ohio, and into parts of Tennessee, Pennsylvania, Indiana and Kentucky. In eastern Tennessee, which felt the earthquake with intensity V, there is a small elliptical region of stronger shaking corresponding to VI–VII.

The earthquake caused landslides and derailed a freight train in Giles County. In Narrows, the ground "rolled in an undulating motion" and springs became muddy or stopped flowing. Similarly, at Pearisburg, the springwater stopped flowing. Many chimneys collapsed or sustained heavy damage, and cracks formed in the walls of old brick houses in Pearisburg. Damage to chimneys was also reported in Charlotte, Oxford, Raleigh, and Winston, North Carolina; and Knoxville, Tennessee. In Indianapolis, Indiana, the shaking was most perceptible on tall buildings; a similar account was also made in Baltimore, Maryland.

Some reports of damage were later proven false, including claims that Angel's Rest mountain near Pearisburg had cracked, that Mountain Lake "caved in", and that wells in Saltville, Virginia, stopped flowing.

=== Foreshocks and aftershocks ===
Prior to the mainshock, on May 3, an intensity VI (Strong) foreshock with an epicenter near Pulaski dislodged some bricks from old chimneys in Giles County. It was also accompanied by "considerable noise". Similar noises were heard in the area leading up to the earthquake. About a week before, the Richmond Dispatch said residents of the county were disturbed by "subterranean noises" likened to the sound of distant artillery. These effects also continued to be felt in Pearisburg after the earthquake, in addition to additional tremors, but after some time, became rarer and weaker. Aftershocks continued to be felt until at least 1902 or possibly as late as 1917. No significant earthquakes were recorded in the region until 1959; a mb 4.6 earthquake on November 20, 1969, was the largest in the area since 1897.

=== Geology ===
The earthquake was likely associated with seismic activity on the Giles County seismic zone in southwestern Virginia. It is a seismically active region about 40 by 10 kilometres (25 by 6 mi) trending northeast and located near Pearisburg and Narrows. Earthquakes in the seismic zone have shallow focal depths ranging from 5 to 25 kilometres (3 to 16 mi) corresponding to the upper crust, based on a study of 12 earthquakes from 1959 to 1980. This seismic zone likely represents a reverse fault dipping 80° northwest in response to compressive intraplate tectonic stress. The 1897 earthquake likely originated from the range of depths contemporary earthquakes were reported at.

The shallow subsurface geology of Giles County comprise a heavily deformed and faulted Paleozoic sedimentary layer extending to a depth of 3 to 6 kilometres (2 to 4 mi). This layer is typically carbonates of the Cambrian and Ordovician, and clastic rocks of the Ordovician, Silurian, Devonian, and Mississippian which formed during orogenies such as the Alleghanian orogeny. Beneath the Paleozoic sediments are near-horizontal detachments that have displaced the overlying strata over several tens of kilometers and separated them from the crystalline basement. These detachments are also related to the Alleghanian orogeny.

The Giles County seismic zone is situated entirely within the Precambrian crystalline basement. It most likely originated from late Precambrian to early Paleozoic continental rifting along normal faults during the early formation of the Iapetus Ocean. These Iapetan normal faults formed within the rifted crystalline basement. Giles County is located within 100 to 200 km (60 to 120 mi) from the former North American continental margin, where it meets the Iapetus Ocean. This region was expected to have undergone Iapetan normal faulting. In the present, the North American plate experiences east–northeast compression, reactivating the pre-existing normal fault in the seismic zone as a reverse fault.

== See also ==
- List of earthquakes in the United States
- 2020 Sparta earthquake
