= 1916 Irondale earthquake =

Earthquake in Alabama on October 18, 1916

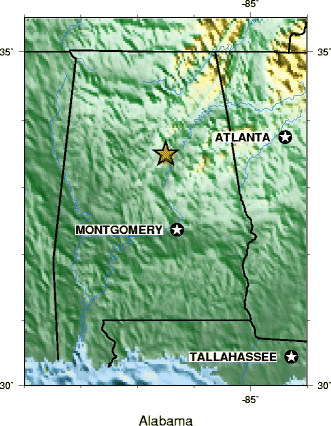
- UTC time: 1916-10-18 22:04:00
- ISC event
- USGS-ANSS: ComCat
- Local date: October 18, 1916
- Local time: 16:04 CST
- Magnitude: 5.1 M_{L}
- Epicenter: 33.53°N 86.69°W
- Areas affected: Alabama, United States
- Max. intensity: MMI VII (Very strong)
- Casualties: None

The 1916 Irondale earthquake struck in the north–central region of the U.S. state of Alabama on October 18. The strongest earthquake in state history, it registered an estimated Richter scale magnitude of 5.1 and resulted in minor damage. Damage was limited to Shelby and Jefferson counties and reached its maximum severity near the epicenter in the city of Irondale, including cracked windows, fallen chimneys, and dried-up wells. While there were no fatalities, the earthquake spawned widespread panic, prompting alarmed workers to evacuate tall buildings.

The earthquake originated in the Eastern Tennessee seismic zone, a fault noted for earthquakes of moderate magnitude. Faulting in the area is strike-slip-oriented, probably because of the Alabama-New York Lineament, which runs adjacent to the seismic zone. Several scientists believe that small earthquakes from the zone indicate the reactivation of deep, ancient faults. Alabama has seen roughly 20 earthquakes since the beginning of the 20th century. The earthquakes have been moderate, never reaching above magnitude 5.1, and they tend to cause damage only near their epicenters while reaching areas much further away. Major events include those in 1916, 1997, and 2003. Despite the lack of powerful seismic events in Alabama, earthquakes from nearby fault zones, including the New Madrid seismic zone, pose a serious threat to infrastructure. An earthquake similar in size to the 1916 Irondale event today could damage thousands of buildings and cause up to $1 billion in damage.

== Background ==
=== Regional ===
Seismicity in the south-central United States is moderately powerful. The energy from a mid-continent earthquake extends over as much as ten times the area of a similarly sized earthquake in the western United States. A magnitude 4.0 earthquake west of the Rocky Mountains reaches up to 60 miles (97 km) from its epicenter, while a magnitude 5.5 earthquake in the eastern US can be felt 300 miles (483 km) from its epicenter. Science failed to explain the phenomena until 1978, when geologists discovered a massive fault line running from the middle of the continent to its eastern coast. More recent magnetic surveys show that the structure is a 500-million year-old strike-slip fault, which starts under the Eastern Tennessee seismic zone and runs to the eastern coast. This corresponds to the strike-slip faulting exhibited in the Eastern Tennessee Zone, and explains the presence of mid-continent earthquakes in the United States. Still, it is not clear if the fault is definitely related to mid-continental seismicity.

=== Local ===
The earthquake happened at daybreak [...] and was preceded by a rumbling noise like the discharge of a heavy cannon in the distance [...] First came the explosion, then the heaving of the earth, the swaying of the trees, the creaking of the trees and the crash of falling things. Report in Press-Register, February 1886

Earthquakes in Alabama are sporadic, and tend to cause little to no damage. During a 91-year period, there were 19 earthquakes, varying from near-imperceptible to damaging. The first known activity in Alabama, the New Madrid earthquakes of 1812, registered Mercalli intensities of VII (Very strong) throughout the northern and central portions of the state. On February 4, 1886, the first recorded earthquake from Alabama hit the western part of the state, jolting people in Sumter and Marengo counties.

Following minor events in 1917, 1927, 1931, and 1939, threatening activity resumed in the late 1950s, when, in 1957, an earthquake near Birmingham extended from northern Alabama to Georgia and Tennessee, cracking and displacing small objects. A 1959 event in Huntsville, although smaller, damaged chimneys, wrecked plaster, and threw objects from shelves and tables. More recently, events occurred in Escambia County in 1997 and in 2003 in Fort Payne, registering magnitudes of 4.9 and spawning shaking. The Fort Payne earthquake spread over 13 states and wrought structural cracks.

== Geology ==
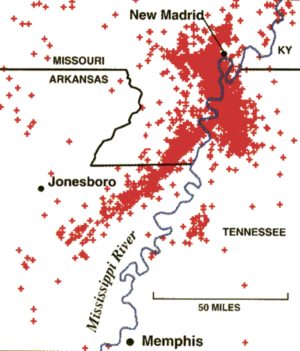
Map of seismic activity in the New Madrid seismic zone from 1974 to 2005

While earthquakes have taken place throughout Alabama, the northern part of the state is associated with the greatest number of earthquakes because it lies near the Appalachian Mountains. Three major fault zones lie near Alabama: the New Madrid, Eastern Tennessee, and South Carolina seismic zones.

The New Madrid seismic zone (NMSZ) lies particularly close and has produced large earthquakes, such as those in 1811 and 1812. Because the fault zone lies in a densely populated area, a major earthquake from the zone could be catastrophic. The Geological Survey of Alabama predicts a 90 percent chance of an earthquake of 6.0 or greater in the area by 2040. The shaking from such an earthquake would spread again into the northern segment of Alabama. The Southern Appalachian system, which extends into Alabama, poses a moderate threat to eastern and central Alabama and is responsible for most of the state's earthquakes. The South Carolina seismic zone has produced earthquakes as powerful as 7.3 on the Richter scale, and a large earthquake originating from it could easily reach Alabama. The 1886 Charleston earthquake, for example, was felt as far as 750 miles (1,207 km) from its epicenter. Another more recently active zone in eastern Tennessee has produced small earthquakes, including one in Alabama in 1997.

The earthquake originated in the Eastern Tennessee seismic zone, among the most active seismic areas in the Southeastern United States and one capable of producing moderately strong earthquakes, a few of which have caused damage. The frequency for non-damaging earthquakes from this zone measures out to about one per year, and it has produced many faint earthquakes recorded on seismographs. Such earthquakes have been helpful in highlighting the activity of faults below the Paleozoic detachment. Fault-plane solutions of multiple earthquakes throughout the area confirmed strike-slip faulting between two steeply declining planes. Both right and left-lateral movement occurs in the area, most movement being associated with north-to-south planes (right-lateral) and east-to-west planes (left-lateral). All of these mechanisms indicate reactivation of basement faults below more-recent faults. These basement faults probably converge on one another, and one being strong and the other being weak, produce earthquakes.

Near its epicenter, the 1916 Irondale earthquake produced intensities measuring VI (Strong) and VII (Very strong) on the Mercalli intensity scale. Further away, its intensities ranged from III (Weak) to IV (Light).

== Damage ==
The earthquake originated near the city of Irondale, 3 miles (5 km) north of Birmingham, striking just after 4 P.M. local time. Because the earthquake took place before Alabama had a seismograph network, its Richter scale magnitude of 5.1 is an estimate, but it is still considered the most powerful earthquake in state history, affecting seven other states: Georgia, Indiana, Kentucky, Mississippi, North Carolina, South Carolina, and Tennessee.

Although there were no deaths, structural damage, including cracked windows, occurred. The most serious damage was in Irondale, where chimneys were toppled. In a two-block area, shaking wrecked fourteen chimneys, including six chimneys at one brick store which collapsed. Throughout the city, oscillation collapsed many other chimneys or damaged them beyond repair. In other cities, chimneys lost bricks and light damage occurred. In Birmingham, a few "poorly built" chimneys sustained damage. Other damage reports included extensive damage to wells; five wells in Irondale were cut off from their underground supplies. Lower water levels were common in both Irondale and Pell City, where one well was lowered by as much as 12 inches (30 cm).

In Birmingham, the shaking prompted the evacuation of office buildings. A news article at the time reported that "The sensation on the upper floors of buildings was similar to that of standing on the deck of a vessel in a slight sea. There was the slight pitch, with the suggestion of a roll".

== Threat ==
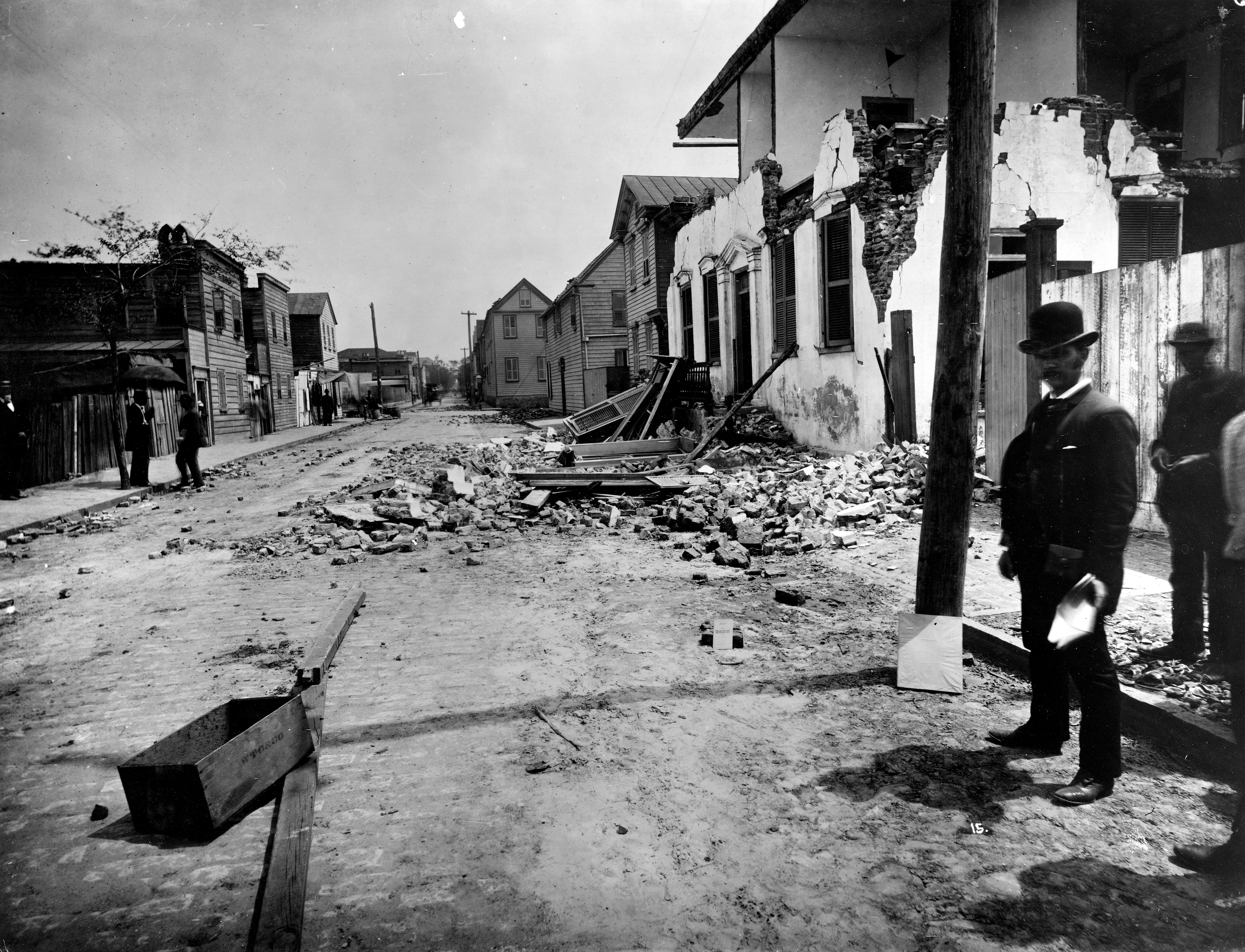
Damage from the magnitude 7.3 1886 Charleston earthquake. An earthquake of similar size could today have a catastrophic impact.

The United States Geological Survey at the Center for Earthquake Research and Information (CERI) at the University of Memphis, along with a seismic station in Birmingham which is part of the Advanced National Seismic System facilitate monitoring of earthquakes in Alabama.

Andrew Goodlife, a professor of geological sciences at the University of Alabama, believes the state is at "high" risk from earthquakes. He claims that "If there is an earthquake in one of the zone areas, North Alabama is certainly going to feel it. There's going to be damage and some perhaps major. If one occurred in the zone close to Memphis, it would be devastating because buildings are not made to withstand earthquakes. Places like San Francisco are aware of earthquake risks and structures are built to withstand them." By his definition, the state's earthquakes are "insignificant". Emergency planner Bill Thomison feels skeptical about a major earthquake, stating, "I don't believe there are any major faults (interface of rocks) here. It depends on the magnitude of the earthquake and the Richter scale. You could have a No. 4 (magnitude) earthquake in California and not damage anything, but the same type in New York could be devastating because the building codes don't factor in earthquakes."

The impact of the 1916 earthquake was minor, but if a similarly sized earthquake were to occur, damage could be extensive. A 2007 United States Geological Survey study estimates that up to $1 billion in damage might result should a fairly powerful earthquake occur in a heavily populated area. Considering building codes, soil types, and population numbers from the 2000 United States census, it estimates 26 buildings destroyed, 3,300 structures damaged, and several deaths.

== See also ==
- List of earthquakes in 1916
- List of earthquakes in the United States

== Sources ==
- Finch, R.H. (1916). "The Alabama earthquake of October 18, 1916". Monthly Weather Review. 44 (12). American Meteorological Society: 690.
