= 2020 Sparta earthquake =

Earthquake in North Carolina, U.S.

- Location within North Carolina
- UTC time: 2020-08-09 12:07:37
- ISC event: 618711487
- USGS-ANSS: ComCat
- Local date: August 9, 2020
- Local time: 8:07:47 EDT (UTC-4)
- Magnitude: M_{w} 5.1
- Depth: 4.7 mi (7.6 km)
- Epicenter: 36.474°N 81.087°W
- Fault: Little River Fault
- Type: Oblique-slip
- Areas affected: North Carolina, Virginia
- Max. intensity: MMI VII (Very strong)
- Foreshocks: Yes
- Aftershocks: Yes
- Casualties: 1 injured

The 2020 Sparta earthquake struck North Carolina on August 9 at 08:07 EDT. The epicenter of this moment magnitude (M_{w}) 5.1 earthquake was near the small town of Sparta, Alleghany County. It was the strongest earthquake recorded in North Carolina in 104 years, the second-strongest in the state's history, and the largest to strike the East Coast since the 2011 Virginia earthquake. It caused damage to homes and businesses in Sparta and injured at least one person. The shaking was also felt in other states along the East Coast and Midwest. A state of emergency was declared in Sparta, and North Carolina granted US$24 million ($29.9 million in 2025) in relief fund for repair works.

The Blue Ridge Mountains are part of the eastern Appalachians which formed about 480 to 300 million years ago during subduction and subsequent continental collision with the African plate. The earthquake occurred in a region where faults have been documented in the area. The United States Geological Survey said that the earthquake was caused by movement on a fault within the North American Plate.

== Background ==
The Blue Ridge Mountains are part of the eastern Appalachians which began formation during the Ordovician, between 440 and 480 million years ago. During that time, the oceanic plate of the Iapetus Ocean subducted beneath North America, forming the early Appalachians. Volcanism, tectonic uplift and erosion continued to shape the Appalachians. The mountain range continued to grow episodically over the next 250 million years, forming the Caledonian, Acadian, Ouachita, Variscan, and Alleghanian orogenies. In the process, pieces of continents and microplates collided and sutured with North America to form a single landmass. The African plate collided with North America about 300 million years ago, forming the Pangaea supercontinent. This collision uplifted the Appalachians to elevations comparable to the Himalayas. When Pangaea broke apart during the Early Mesozoic, uplifting of the Appalachians ceased, and weathering eventually eroded the range to an almost flat terrain by the end of the era. Another period of uplift occurred during the Cenozoic Era which led to aggressive erosion by rivers and streams.

The earthquake occurred in the Blue Ridge Mountains of the Alleghanian orogeny, a region that transitions between thrust and strike-slip tectonics. Faults in this part of the range typically trend west–northwest to east–west, and the earthquake ruptured along a fault with a similar orientation (west–northwest to east–southeast). These faults cross major northeast-trending geological structures of the mountain range. However, they have not been studied in detail.

== Earthquake ==
The earthquake struck on August 9, at 08:07 EDT, with an epicenter 4 km (2.5 mi) southeast of Sparta. Measuring M_{w} 5.1, it was the state's largest earthquake since a M_{fa} 5.2 earthquake struck Skyland in 1916, and the strongest to strike the East Coast since the 2011 Virginia earthquake. In Sparta, the earthquake was assigned a maximum Modified Mercalli intensity of VI–VII and its peak ground acceleration exceeded 0.2 g.

According to the United States Geological Survey, the mainshock was the result of oblique-reverse faulting within the North American plate. The "relatively uncommon" earthquake occurred in the interior of the plate, hence, is known as an intraplate earthquake. Four foreshocks of magnitudes between 2.1 and 2.6 were recorded beginning about 25 hours prior to the earthquake. The focal mechanism solutions for the earthquake indicate rupture occurred on a moderately dipping fault either striking to the northwest or south. Further analysis of the aftershocks, field, and InSAR data favored a west-northwest trending fault with a south-southwest dip. There were 20 aftershocks recorded by August 28; the strongest was a M_{d} 2.9 event that struck two days after the mainshock.

Ground fracturing was discovered south and southeast of Sparta while none were observed in the immediate epicenter area. A surface rupture extending over 1.5 mi (2.4 km) appeared southeast of the town. The earthquake ruptured along this previously unmapped fault within the upper bedrock, later known as the Little River Fault. Trenching across the fault indicate it is a west-northwest–east-southeast striking thrust fault located within the local Paleozoic fabric. The surface fault trace is characterised by scarps and folds measuring 1.9–11.8 in (4.8–30.0 cm) high and 19.7 in (50 cm) at its maximum. It was the first time surface rupture from an earthquake has been found in the Eastern United States, and the second in Eastern North America, the other being the 1989 Ungava earthquake (M_{s} 6.3). The rupture propagated beneath Greenway Drive industrial park which damaged several buildings, buckled Rivers Edge Road, and severed a water line.

== Impact ==
Strong ground motion map by USGS

Severe damage occurred in Sparta, further impacting businesses which were already affected by the COVID-19 pandemic. The town's manager, Ryan Wilmoth, said there were "very minor injuries" but did not specify the number of people injured, and there was only one confirmed injury. Many homes and business infrastructure were damaged; most were material damage that left the structure's integrity unaffected. A majority of structural damage was observed in unreinforced brick, masonry and concrete elements. Within a week of the earthquake, there were 60 cases of serious damage and 465 minor damage reports. Seventeen buildings were listed as unsafe for use and five were eventually demolished. At least 19 people lost their homes. Carpark ground fracturing and smashed ceramics were reported at Scott's Landscaping Nursery and Farms while at the Kathy Shore Tree Nursery, its owner estimated the repair cost at several hundred thousand dollars. The Alleghany County administration office and a water supply network were damaged. Headstones were ripped from the ground, and several chimneys were toppled or destroyed. Parts of Tennessee, Ohio, Washington D.C., and Atlanta also felt the earthquake, several hundred miles away from the epicenter.

== Aftermath ==
Sparta mayor Wes Brinegar, issued a state of emergency to apply for FEMA and state financial aid, but did not qualify for the former's disaster assistance criteria. At least $112 thousand ($139.3 thousand in 2025) in state assistance grants were handed out, and the Small Business Administration issued $1.17 million ($1.5 million in 2025) in loans. The legislature of North Carolina also allocated $24 million ($29.9 million in 2025) for relief. This funding supported a three-year repair project called the Earthquake Recovery Program, operated by the Office of State Budget and Management and North Carolina Emergency Management. By 2021, there were over 230 requests for home repair assistance, averaging $44 thousand ($54.7 thousand in 2025) per home.

Brinegar also cautioned residents about scams on GoFundMe as officials did not raise any request on the site. Scammers took advantage of the damage, impersonating construction workers and charging people up to $500 for repairs only to never provide the services. Governor of North Carolina, Roy Cooper, toured the damage in Sparta, and reassured its residents; "We’ve dealt with a hurricane, a violent tornado, and now an earthquake all in the middle of a pandemic: North Carolinians are resilient." Nine displaced people from six households received help from the Red Cross.

== See also ==
- List of earthquakes in 2020
- List of earthquakes in the United States
- 1897 Giles County earthquake
