= Indian River Inlet Bridge =

Bridge in United States of America

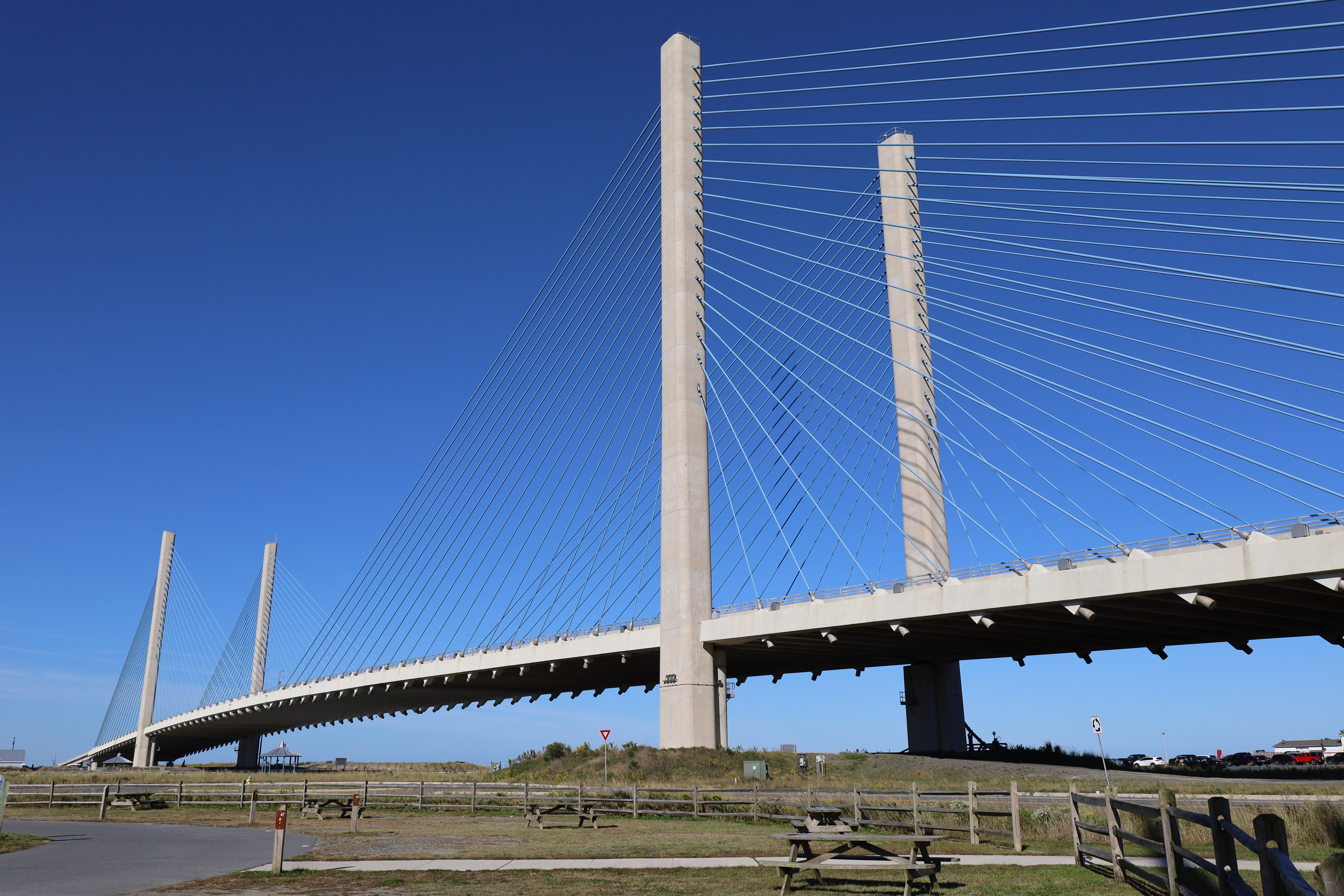
- The bridge in 2020
- Coordinates: 38°36′29″N 75°3′49″W
- Carries: 4 lanes of DE 1 / Bike Route 1, pedestrians, and bicycles
- Crosses: Indian River Inlet
- Locale: Sussex County, Delaware
- Official name: Charles W. Cullen Bridge
- Maintained by: Delaware Department of Transportation

Characteristics
- Design: Cable-stayed bridge
- Total length: 2,600 feet (790 m)
- Width: 107.66 feet (32.81 m)
- Longest span: 950 feet (290 m)
- Clearance below: 45 feet (14 m)

History
- Opened: January 20, 2012

Location
- Interactive map of Indian River Inlet Bridge

The Indian River Inlet Bridge (officially the Charles W. Cullen Bridge) is a cable-stayed bridge located in Sussex County, Delaware, in the United States. It carries four lanes of Delaware Route 1 (DE 1) over the Indian River Inlet between the Indian River Bay and the Atlantic Ocean. The bridge also carries Delaware Bicycle Route 1 (Bike Route 1) across the inlet. The bridge is within Delaware Seashore State Park between Dewey Beach and Bethany Beach. The Indian River Inlet Bridge is maintained by the Delaware Department of Transportation (DelDOT). The bridge is 2,600 feet (792 m) long and 107.66 feet (32.81 m) wide, with a span of 950 feet (290 m) and overhead clearance of 45 feet (14 m).

Prior to the current bridge, four other bridges have spanned the Indian River Inlet, opened in 1934, 1940, 1952, 1965, and 1976, the latter serving as a twin span to the 1965 one. All were known informally as the Indian River Inlet Bridge, and all but the first officially were named the Charles W. Cullen Bridge. The 1965 and 1976 bridges, of the steel girdertype, were subject to scouring from the inlet, leading to the need to replace them. Initial plans for a tied-arch bridge over the inlet in 2004 were over budget, and 2006 plans for a 1,400-foot (427-meter) cable-stayed bridge were cancelled because of early construction and legal problems. Construction of the current, 2,600-foot (792-meter) bridge began in 2008 as part of a design-build project, with Skanska awarded the contract to build the bridge. The current Indian River Inlet Bridge opened partially in January 2012 and completely in May 2012 at a cost of $150 million.

== Description ==
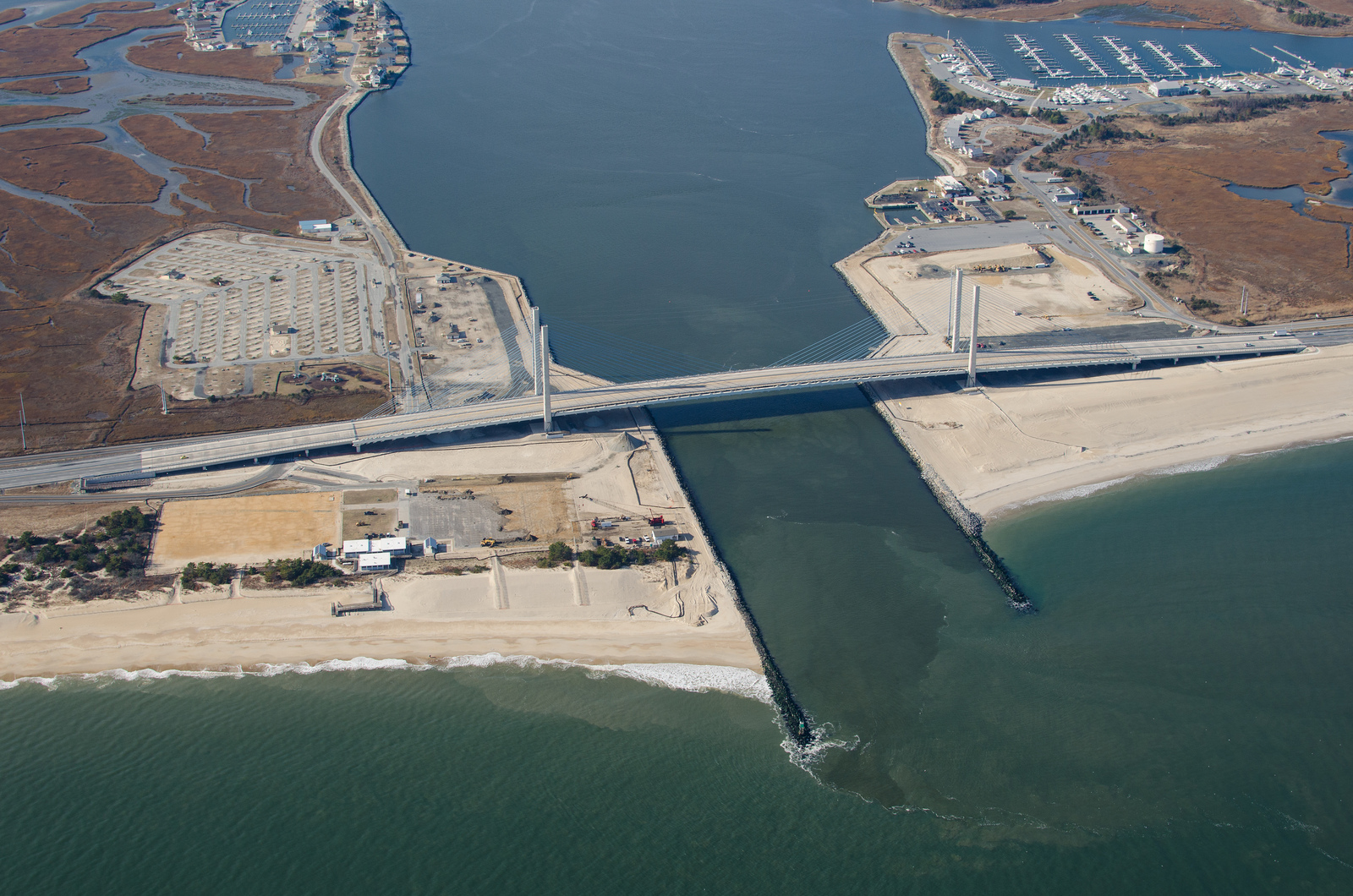
Indian River Inlet Bridge photographed from an altitude of 2,000 feet (610 meters), looking westward from over the Atlantic Ocean toward Indian River Bay.

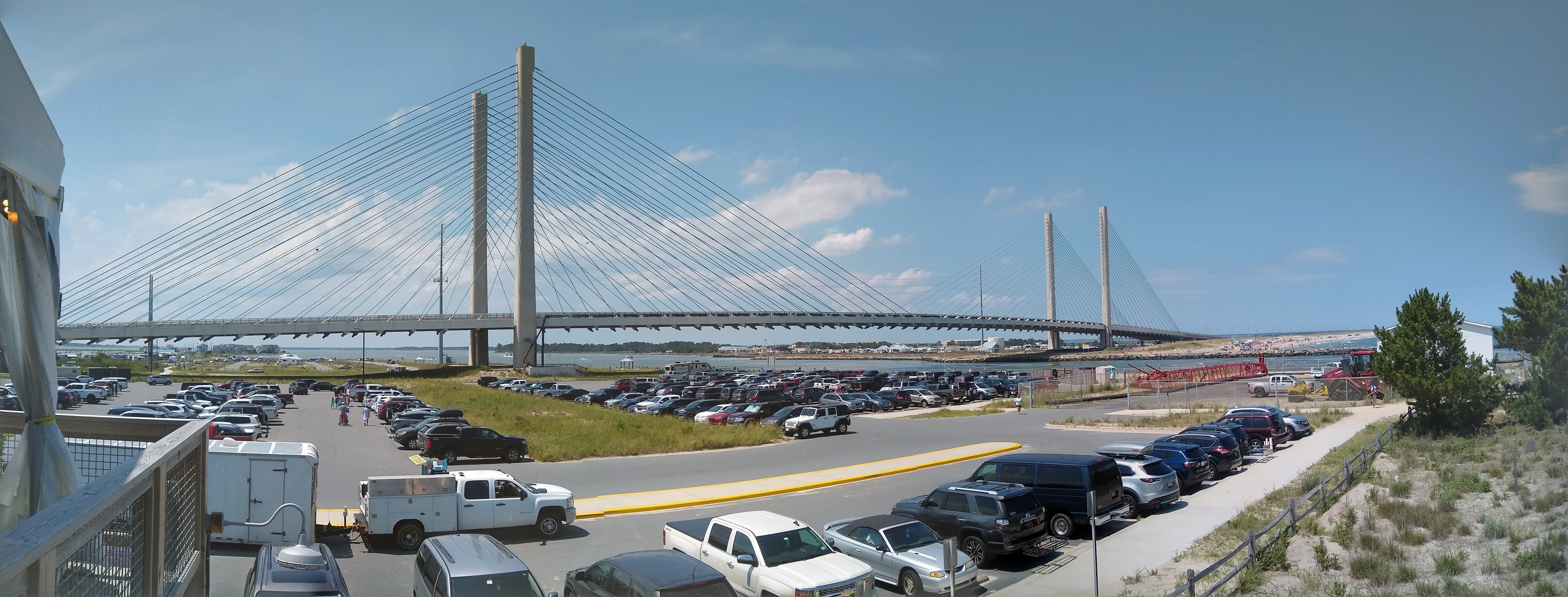
Indian River Inlet Bridge from Delaware Seashore State Park in 2020

The Indian River Inlet Bridge crosses the Indian River Inlet connecting the Atlantic Ocean to the east and the Indian River Bay to the west. The bridge is located within Delaware Seashore State Park and carries DE 1 and Bike Route 1 between Dewey Beach to the north and Bethany Beach to the south. It carries four 12-foot (3.7-meter) lanes of traffic (two northbound and two southbound), a 4-foot (1.2-meter) interior and 10-foot (3-meter) exterior shoulder in each direction, and a 12-foot (3.7-meter)-wide sidewalk on the east side of the bridge for pedestrians and bicycles.

The Indian River Inlet Bridge is a cable-stayed bridge, consisting of four pylon towers with 152 stays supporting the bridge. The pylons are located on land in order to avoid erosion from the inlet. The bridge has a total length of 2,600 feet (792 m) and a total width of 107.66 feet (32.81 m). The span of the bridge is 950 feet (290 m) with an overhead clearance of 45 feet (14 m). The height of the pylon towers is 247.5 feet (75.4 m) above sea level. The bridge has a fiber-optic system that monitors it for issues that could affect its structural integrity. The bridge is designed to last 100 years.

Officially named the Charles W. Cullen Bridge, the bridge is the fourth one at the Indian River Inlet to be named in honor of Charles W. Cullen (July 8, 1865 – July 10, 1948), a lawyer and judge from Georgetown. He served on the Delaware State Highway Commission from 1930 to 1940 and as its chairman from 1938 to 1939, during which time he oversaw construction of the second bridge to span the Indian River Inlet, replacing a 1934 timber bridge. This bridge was dedicated in May 1940 as the Charles W. Cullen Bridge, but became popularly known as the Indian River Inlet Bridge. The 2012 bridge's dedication plaque, located at the pedestrian entrance at the south end of the bridge, reads as follows:

This bridge is named in honor and remembrance of Charles West Cullen (1865–1948), a man who dedicated his life to public service and to the citizens of Delaware. Between 1930 and 1940, he served on the State Highway Commission, eventually being elevated to Chairman of the Commission from 1938-1939. While he was Chairman, work was started on a new bridge to span the Indian River Inlet. In recognition for his service on the Commission, the bridge was dedicated on May 28, 1940, in his name for his advocacy for the proper opening of the inlet and the internal development of the Indian River. Two additional bridges bearing his name have spanned the inlet since that time. This, the fifth bridge to span the inlet waterway, is also being dedicated in his name. As this bridge serves the public, let us not forget the lifetime of service that he gave.

== History ==
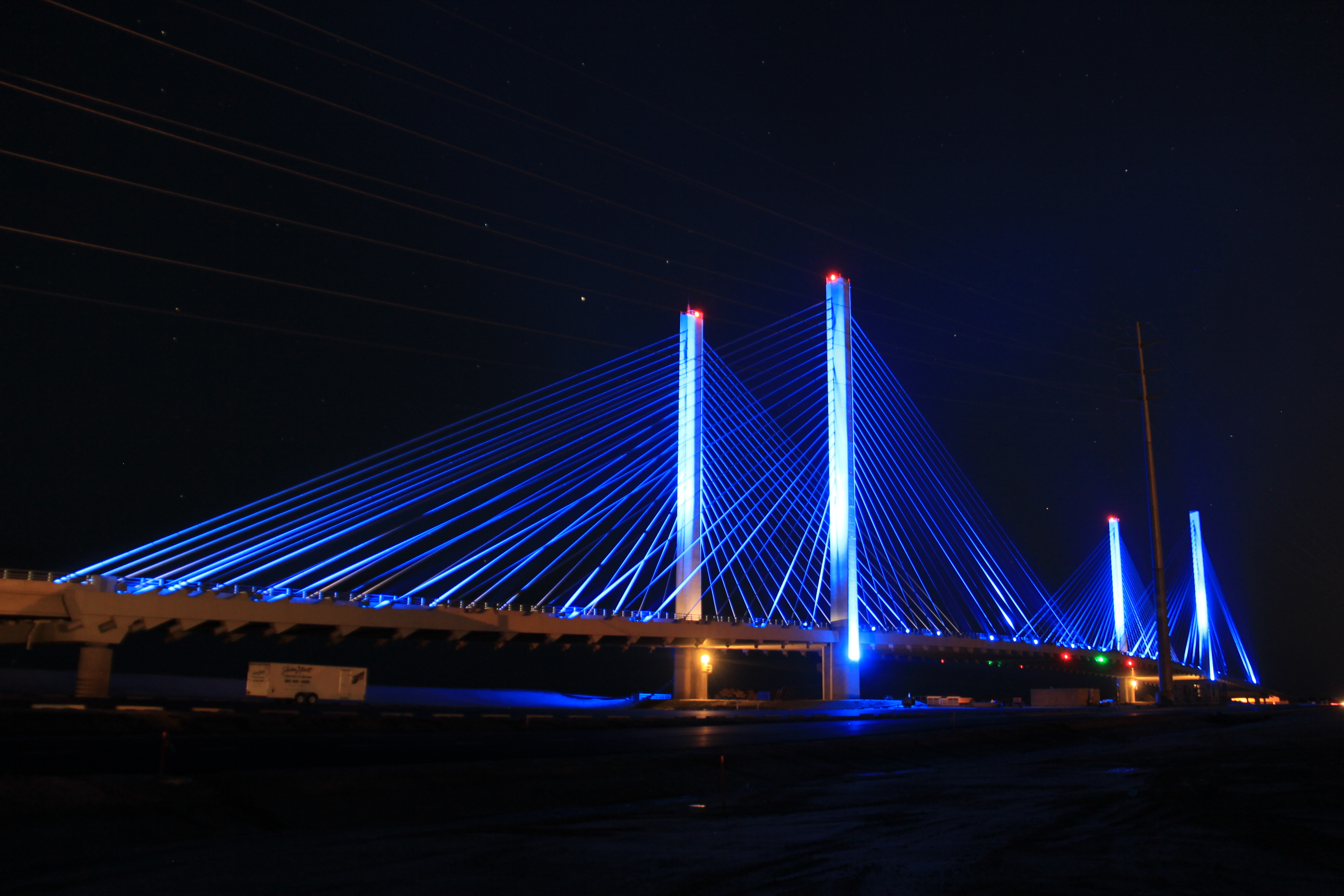
The Indian River Inlet Bridge at night in 2014

The increase in private automobile ownership and growing popularity of Delaware's beach resort towns during the first half of the 20th century led Delaware to construct the Ocean Highway (present-day DE 1 and now known as Coastal Highway) between Rehoboth Beach and Bethany Beach. Completed in 1933, the Ocean Highway lacked a link to carry it across the Indian River Inlet.

Until 1928, the Indian River Inlet was a natural waterway that shifted up and down a two-mile (3.2 km) stretch of the coast. Dredging kept the inlet open in its current location between 1928 and 1937, and in 1938 the United States Army Corps of Engineers built jetties that hold it in place. With the inlet in a fixed place, it became possible after 1928 to build a bridge to span it, and the completion of the Ocean Highway in 1933 prompted Delaware to build a span to connect the northern and southern segments of the highway.

=== Earlier bridges ===
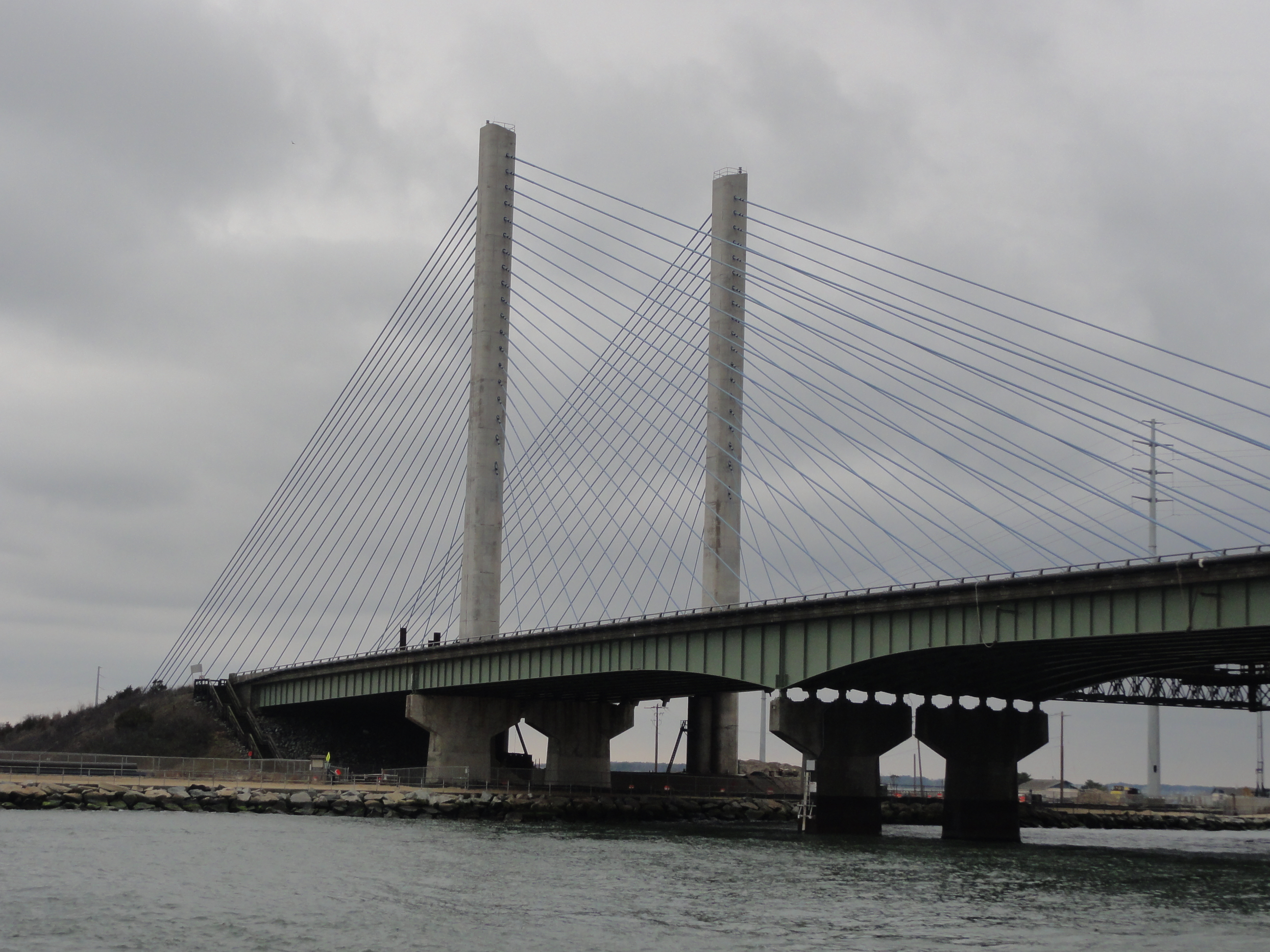
The steel girder bridge built in 1965 and widened with an additional span in 1976 is in the foreground, with the new bridge behind it in 2012.

Five bridges have been constructed across the Indian River Inlet. The first was a creosote timber trestle bridge built in 1934; its timbers deteriorated quickly in the maritime environment prevailing at the inlet. It was replaced by a concrete-and-steel swing bridge, the first to be named for Cullen, construction of which began in 1938. This swing bridge, which included a 4-foot (1.2-meter) pedestrian walkway and cost $165,900, opened with a dedication ceremony on May 28, 1940, but collapsed on February 10, 1948, succumbing to a combination of a very high tide combined with an easterly wind and ice flows deeply scouring the inlet bottom under its piers; a pickup truck on the bridge at the time of the collapse fell into the inlet, killing three men who drowned inside the truck. Another concrete-and-steel swing bridge completed in 1952, the second to be named for Cullen, also became structurally unsound due to ice flow and was closed in 1962 due to storm damage.

The next bridge to be constructed at the site was an 860-foot (262-meter) steel girder bridge, the third to be named for Cullen. Its first span opened in 1965, and it was widened by the addition in 1976 of a second span slightly to the west of the first one, the newer span carrying southbound traffic while the older span became one-way northbound. When the first span opened in 1965, the inlet was 23 feet (7.0 meters) deep, but inlet currents led to scouring of the piers of the bridge, first noticed in the 1980s. By the late 1980s, scouring was severe enough to allow U.S. Army Corps of Engineers divers to swim beneath one of the span's concrete footings. The Corps installed protective riprap around the bridge piers in 1989, but this was only a temporary solution; realizing that the bridge could be compromised by damage from just one severe storm, Delaware officials listed it as structurally deficient and requiring replacement. Scouring had increased the inlet's depth to over 100 feet (30 meters) by 1999, leading the Corps of Engineers and Delaware officials to question the stability of the pilings and their protective riprap. By 2005, various reports gave the bridge an expected lifespan of three to five years and estimated that it would have to be closed sometime between 2008 and 2011 and would collapse sometime between 2008 and 2013. By 2007, the bridge carried 14,000 cars on an average day and an average of 28,000 cars per day during the summer months, and the disruption to traffic if the bridge had to be closed before a replacement could open was of increasing concern.

=== Current bridge ===
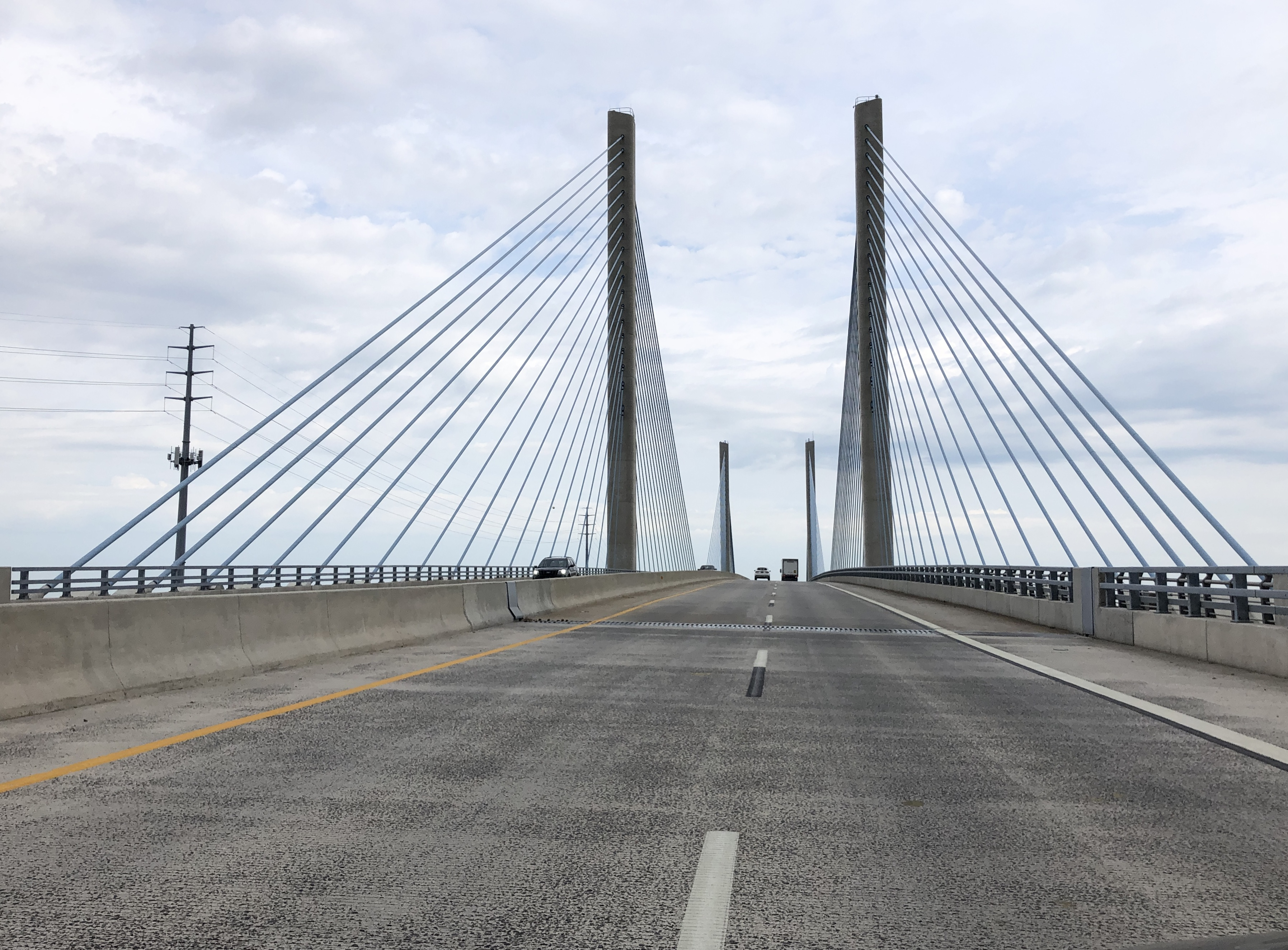
Indian River Inlet Bridge looking north in 2022

==== Early plans and problems ====
On August 20, 2003, Delaware officials unveiled plans at a public workshop for a new bridge to replace the 1965 bridge and its 1976 addition. A tied-arch design spanning the inlet slightly west of the 1976 addition to the 1965 bridge, the new bridge would have had the longest arched span in the world, with a length of 1,000 feet (300 meters). With an estimated cost of $65 million, the new bridge would have had no piers in the water, avoiding the scouring problems that had plagued the earlier spans. Delaware officials hoped that work could begin in the autumn of 2004 and be completed two years later. However, the tied-arch design deterred all but one bidder on the construction contract, and that bid came in much higher than expected and was more than DelDOT could afford at the time. By the autumn of 2005, a $200 million shortfall in the state transportation budget had delayed construction projects all over Delaware and forced the state to put plans for the new bridge on hold, and in the meantime rising labor and materials costs drove the cost of the bridge up to $200 million, $50 million above the budget.

DelDOT scrapped plans for the tied-arch bridge and put bids out in 2006 for a design–build project for a new bridge of a cable-stayed design, 1,400 feet (430 meters) long and without piers in the water. Construction of earthen approach ramps for the new bridge began on either side of the inlet in February 2006; the ramp on the north side of the inlet was completed in December 2006 and that on the south side was finished in February 2007. However, concerns over instability of these ramps arose in the autumn of 2006, and by March 2007 it had become clear that movement of the ramps was greater than expected. Legal problems also began to affect progress, when an unsuccessful bidder on the new construction contract questioned the process by which it had been awarded to another company that had made a bid of $124.9 million – $800,000 more than the lowest bid – but had nonetheless won the contract based on ambiguous pricing and technical criteria. Labor union leaders also complained that the winning bidder had not promised to use Delaware union labor, unlike the lower bidder. Faced with the possibility of a lawsuit, DelDOT in October 2007 decided to cancel construction of the bridge under the existing contract, have the unstable approach ramps removed, and rebid the contract for a longer, 2,600-foot (792-meter) cable-stayed bridge – again without piers in the water – of a new design that did not require the flawed approach ramps. During 2008, the approach ramps were removed, and the Delaware legislature passed a new bond bill making it easier for state officials to award a bid under clearer pricing and technical criteria.

==== Construction ====
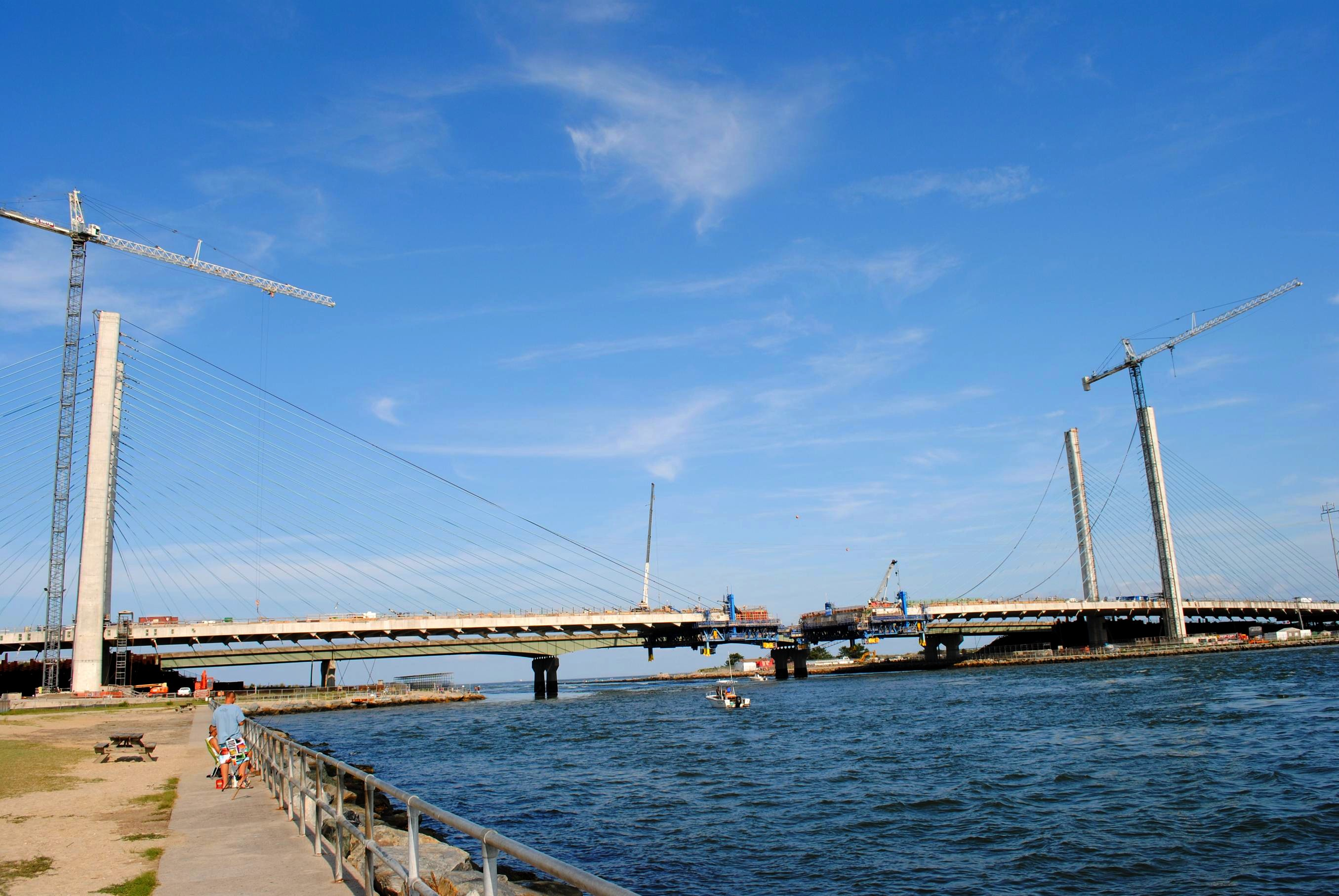
The Indian River Inlet Bridge under construction in 2011

In August 2008, Skanska was awarded the $150-million design–build contract to build the new bridge. Skanska started driving test pilings into the ground in the later part of 2008. In May 2009, public voting for the aesthetic design features of the bridge decided that the cables would be blue, the pylon tops would be slanted with railings, and the lighting fixtures for the walkway would have a nautical theme. The test pilings for the bridge were completed in June 2009. Construction of the pylons began in July 2009 with the pouring of concrete into the first pylon. By December 2009, construction had begun on the approach foundations and the edge girders, with work continuing on the pylon towers and the side abutments. The completion of the design phase of the project and the beginning of the concrete pour for the bridge deck took place in April 2010. In May 2010, the bridge received $1.79 million in federal funding for the pedestrian and bike paths. By this time, the new Indian River Inlet Bridge was about halfway complete.

On January 28, 2011, DelDOT filed a lawsuit against bridge design firm FIGG Bridge Engineers and subconsultant MACTEC Engineering and Consulting for geotechnical errors. In February 2011, DelDOT awarded George & Lynch an $11.6 million contract to build the approach roads to the new Indian River Inlet Bridge as well as to demolish the old bridge. A minor fire occurred on the north side of the bridge construction site; no damage was reported to the bridge structure. The north side of the bridge was finished in August 2011 when the form travelers were removed. Over 250 people were employed in the construction of the bridge.

The new Indian River Inlet Bridge opened to southbound traffic on January 20, 2012. Delaware Governor Jack Markell, U.S. Senator Tom Carper, and DelDOT Secretary Shailen Bhatt rode in the first car across the bridge. On January 30, 2012, one northbound lane of the new bridge opened. On May 6, 2012, the Indian River Inlet Bridge was officially dedicated in a public ceremony in which visitors were able to walk across the bridge. All remaining lanes of the four-lane bridge as well as its pedestrian and bicycle walkway opened that day.

Demolition of the 1965 bridge and its 1976 addition began in the spring of 2012 and was completed in the spring of 2013.

== See also ==
- Senator William V. Roth Jr. Bridge
