= New York–Alabama Lineament =

The New York–Alabama Lineament is a magnetic anomaly in the geology of eastern North America running from Alabama to New York. The lineament is defined by discontinuities in aeromagnetic measurements indicating an approximately 220-kilometre (140 mi) displacement of buried geologic structures along this line. The displacement is attributed to the presence of a deeply buried strike-slip fault, possibly dating to the general time of the Grenville orogeny. The lineament was first described in 1978. The fault zone has been associated with the Eastern Tennessee seismic zone.
