= 2003 Alabama earthquake =

Earthquake near Fort Payne, Alabama in 2003

Coordinates: 34.494°N 85.629°W

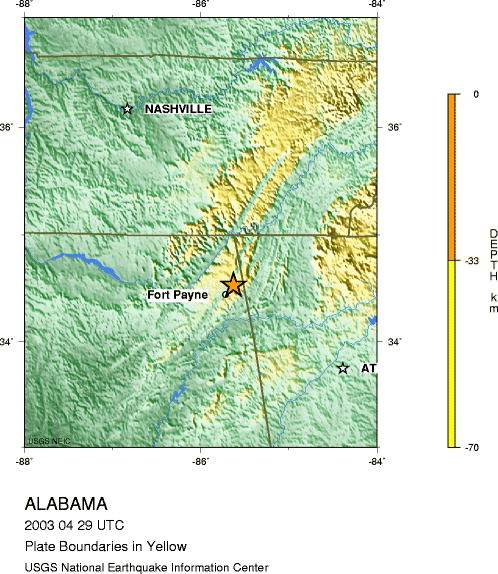
The epicenter of the 2003 Alabama earthquake. Source: United States Geological Survey

The 2003 Alabama earthquake took place on April 29 at 3:59 A.M. Central Daylight Time (local time when the event occurred) eight miles (13 km) east-northeast of Fort Payne, Alabama. The number of people who felt this quake was exceptionally high as the earthquake could be felt in 11 states across the East Coast and as far north as southern Indiana. The earthquake was strongly felt throughout metropolitan Atlanta. The Georgia Building Authority was called out to inspect the historic Georgia State Capitol in downtown Atlanta and other state-owned buildings but found no problems. However, this is not out of the ordinary as earthquakes east of the Rocky Mountains can be felt several times the area felt on West Coast earthquakes. The earthquake was given a magnitude 4.6 on the moment magnitude scale by the USGS (other sources reported as high a magnitude as 4.9) and reports of the duration of the shaking range from 10 seconds to as long as 45 seconds. It is tied with a 1973 earthquake near Knoxville, Tennessee as the strongest earthquake ever to occur in the Eastern Tennessee seismic zone, which is the second most active seismic zone east of the Rocky Mountains, with the New Madrid seismic zone the most active.

The April 29 earthquake caused moderate damage in northern Alabama including a 29-foot (8.8 m) wide sinkhole northwest of Fort Payne. The quake disrupted the local water supply. There were numerous reports of chimney damage, broken windows, and cracked walls, particularly around the area near Hammondville, Mentone and Valley Head, Alabama. Many 9-1-1 call centers were overloaded with worrisome and panicked residents, who thought it was a train derailment, a bomb, or some other type of explosion that had awakened them. There were several aftershocks, all of magnitude 2.0 or lower, and were not widely felt.

== See also ==
- List of earthquakes in 2003
- List of earthquakes in the United States
