= Virginia seismic zones =

The Virginia seismic zones in the U.S. state of Virginia include the Giles County seismic zone and the Central Virginia seismic zone. Earthquakes in the state are irregular and rarely reach over 4.5 in magnitude.

== 1897 event ==
The May 31, 1897, event was the strongest in Virginia's history. With a maximum Mercalli intensity of VIII (Severe) this shock destroyed many chimneys and created ground effects over a large area. It had a magnitude of 5.6 M_{fa} (a seismic scale that is based on an isoseismal map or the event's felt area) and had severe effects in Narrows, where ground motion was observed and the flow of streams was disrupted. The quake was widely reported along the Eastern Seaboard and MidWest.

== 2003 earthquakes ==
On December 9, 2003, at 3:59 pm EST (20:59 UTC), a magnitude 4.5 event occurred near Farmville about 30 miles (48 km) west of Richmond, and was felt strongly across the state. Tremors were reported in North Carolina, Washington DC, and suburban Maryland, eastern West Virginia, southern Pennsylvania, and portions of the Delmarva Peninsula. This event was located at 37.728° N, 78.087° W, at a depth of less than 5 km (3.1 mi) and may have occurred due to rupture along the Lakeside fault.

== 2011 earthquake ==
The U.S. Geological Survey (USGS) reported that a magnitude 5.8 M_{w} earthquake hit Virginia on Tuesday, August 23, 2011, at 17:51:04 UTC (1:51 pm Eastern Daylight Time). The quake occurred at an approximate depth of 3.7 miles and was centered in Louisa County (location at 37.936°N, 77.933°W), 5 miles SSW of Mineral, Virginia and 37 miles NW of Richmond, Virginia's capital. Shaking was felt from Atlanta, Georgia to Illinois to Detroit, Michigan to Barrie, Ontario to New Brunswick. Many Washington, DC buildings saw precautionary evacuations. The earthquake caused an estimated $70 million in damage in Louisa County and forced Louisa County High School and Thomas Jefferson Elementary School to close for the year as well as rendered about a dozen homes unlivable. Other buildings were damaged as far away as Prince George's County, Maryland. Three decorative pinnacles at Washington National Cathedral fell. The Washington Monument was closed due to cracks in the top section.

== See also ==
- Eastern Tennessee seismic zone
- List of earthquakes in the United States
