= Pleasant Valley =

Pleasant Valley may refer to:

== Places ==
=== Canada ===
==== Nova Scotia ====
- Pleasant Valley, Antigonish County
- Pleasant Valley, Colchester County
- Pleasant Valley, Halifax Regional Municipality
- Pleasant Valley, Pictou County
- Pleasant Valley, Yarmouth County

==== Ontario ====
- Pleasant Valley, Manitoulin District, Ontario
- Pleasant Valley, Renfrew County, Ontario
- Pleasant Valley, Stormont, Dundas and Glengarry Counties, Ontario

==== Saskatchewan ====
- Rural Municipality of Pleasant Valley No. 288, Saskatchewan

=== New Zealand ===
- Pleasant Valley, New Zealand

=== United Kingdom ===
- Pleasant Valley, Pembrokeshire, a settlement in the community of Amroth, Pembrokeshire, Wales

=== United States ===
==== Alaska ====
- Pleasant Valley, Alaska

==== Arkansas ====
- Pleasant Valley, Pope County, Arkansas
- Pleasant Valley (Little Rock), a neighborhood

==== California ====
- Pleasant Valley, California
- Pleasant Valley (Fresno County, California), near Coalinga, California
  - Pleasant Valley State Prison

==== Colorado ====
- Pleasant Valley (Colorado)

==== Connecticut ====
- Pleasant Valley, Connecticut

==== Illinois ====
- Pleasant Valley, Illinois

==== Indiana ====
- Pleasant Valley, St. Joseph County, Indiana
- Pleasant Valley, Martin County, Indiana

==== Iowa ====
- Pleasant Valley Township, Scott County, Iowa

==== Kansas ====
- Pleasant Valley, Cowley County, Kansas, in Cowley County
- Pleasant Valley, Lincoln County, Kansas

==== Maryland ====
- Pleasant Valley (Maryland), a valley in Washington County
- Pleasant Valley, Allegany County, Maryland
- Pleasant Valley, Calvert County, Maryland
- Pleasant Valley, Carroll County, Maryland
- Pleasant Valley, (Cooksville, Maryland)

==== Michigan ====
- Pleasant Valley, Antrim County, Michigan, an unincorporated community in Echo Township
- Pleasant Valley, Berrien County, Michigan, a settlement and former post office in Pipestone Township
- Pleasant Valley, Livingston County, Michigan, a former settlement and post office in Brighton Township
- Pleasant Valley, Midland County, Michigan, a settlement and former post office in Jasper Township

==== Minnesota ====
- Pleasant Valley, Minnesota

==== Missouri ====
- Pleasant Valley, Missouri

==== Nebraska ====
- Pleasant Valley, Nebraska

==== Nevada ====
- Pleasant Valley, Nevada a small unincorporated community in Washoe County.
- Pleasant Valley, White Pine County, Nevada former populated place

==== New Jersey ====
- Pleasant Valley, Mercer County, New Jersey
- Pleasant Valley, Monmouth County, New Jersey
- Pleasant Valley, Warren County, New Jersey
- Pleasant Valley Crossroads, New Jersey

==== New York ====
- Pleasant Valley (town), New York
  - Pleasant Valley (CDP), New York

==== Oregon ====
- Pleasant Valley, Baker County, Oregon, an unincorporated community
- Pleasant Valley, Josephine County, Oregon, an unincorporated community
- Pleasant Valley, Portland, Oregon, a neighborhood
- Pleasant Valley, Tillamook County, Oregon, an unincorporated community

==== Pennsylvania ====
- Pleasant Valley, Berks County, Pennsylvania
- Pleasant Valley, Bucks County, Pennsylvania

==== Texas ====
- Pleasant Valley, Texas
- Pleasant Valley, Potter County, Texas, now part of Amarillo

==== Virginia ====
- Pleasant Valley, Buckingham County, Virginia
- Pleasant Valley, Rockingham County, Virginia

==== West Virginia ====
- Pleasant Valley, Hancock County, West Virginia, an unincorporated community
- Pleasant Valley, Marion County, West Virginia, a city
- Pleasant Valley, Marshall County, West Virginia, an unincorporated community

==== Wisconsin ====
- Pleasant Valley, Eau Claire County, Wisconsin, a town
- Pleasant Valley, Grant County, Wisconsin, a former unincorporated community
- Pleasant Valley, the former name of Princeton, Wisconsin, in Green Lake County
- Pleasant Valley, St. Croix County, Wisconsin, a town
- Pleasant Valley, Vernon County, Wisconsin, an unincorporated community

== Valleys ==
- Pleasant Valley, Arizona, now known as the Tonto Basin site of the Pleasant Valley War
- Pleasant Valley (Power and Bingham counties, Idaho), located west of the American Falls Reservoir in southeastern Idaho
- Pleasant Valley (Nevada-Utah), a valley, located in White Pine County, Nevada and Juab County, Utah
- Pleasant Valley (Fresno County, California), located on the western side of California

== Other uses ==
- Pleasant Valley State Prison, in Coalinga, California
- Pleasant Valley War, fought in Navajo and Apache counties, Arizona

== See also ==
- Pleasant Vale (disambiguation)
- Pleasant Valley High School (disambiguation)
- Pleasant Valley Township (disambiguation)
