= List of earthquakes in Nevada =

This is a list of earthquakes that have occurred in or near the US state of Nevada. Only earthquakes with a magnitude of 6.0 or greater will be included. Smaller quakes will not be listed unless they have caused damage, death or injury.

Date	Location	Magnitude	Fatalities	Notes	Article	Ref
September 3, 1857	Truckee	6.0 M_{L}		Minor damage to a courthouse in Nevada City.		
March 15, 1860	Reno	6.5 M_{L}		Rockslides were reported between Pyramid Lake and Carson City.		
May 30, 1868	Virginia City	6.0 M_{L}		Plaster was knocked off almost every brick building in Virginia City. Hot water at Steamboat Springs turned into mud.		
December 27, 1869	Virginia City	6.4 M_{L}		Severe damage to masonry walls of buildings in Virginia City and Washoe City. Damage also reported in Spring Gulch and Mokelumne Hill.		
December 27, 1869	Carson City	6.2 M_{L}		Damage in Carson City, Dayton, Genoa, Steamboat and Virginia City.		
March 23, 1872	Augusta Mountains	5.5 M_{fa}		Plasters fell off a courthouse in Austin.		
March 26, 1872	Owens Valley	7.8–7.9 M_{w}	27		1872 Owens Valley earthquake	
December 11, 1872	Big Smokey Valley	6.0 M_{L}				
June 3, 1887	Carson City	6.5 M_{w}		Suspected uplift at Deadman's Ranch. Homes shifted off their foundations in Genoa. Damage to brick walls and plasters in Reno, Virginia City, and parts of California.		
February 18, 1914	Reno	6.0 M_{fa}		Large cracks to structures in Reno. Some fires broke out. Foreshock of the April earthquake.	1914 Reno earthquakes	
April 24, 1914	Reno	6.4 M_{fa}		Several people fainted. Major damage.	1914 Reno earthquakes	
October 2, 1915	Tobin Range	6.8 M_{w} 7.6 M_{s}		Limited damage.	1915 Pleasant Valley earthquake	
December 21, 1932	Cedar Mountain	6.8 M_{w} 7.2 M		Limited damage.	1932 Cedar Mountain earthquake	
June 25, 1933	Buckskin Range	6.1 M_{s}				
January 30, 1934	Excelsior Mountains	6.5 M_{s}				
March 12, 1934	Great Salt Lake	6.6 M_{w}	2		1934 Hansel Valley earthquake	
July 6, 1954	Fallon	6.8 M_{L}		Several sailors injured at a nearby Naval Auxiliary Air Station.	1954 Fallon earthquake	
July 6, 1954	Fallon	6.2 M_{w}		Aftershock.		
August 24, 1954	Stillwater	6.6 M_{w}		Earthquake sequence. This earthquake damaged nearby dams, irrigation facilities, roads and buildings.	1954 Stillwater earthquake	
December 16, 1954	Fairview Peak	7.3 M_{w}		Largest mainshock. Produced large surface ruptures. Triggered numerous landslides, rockfall and mudflows. Damage to towns was limited to cracks and chimneys toppling.	1954 Fairview earthquake	
December 16, 1954	Dixie Valley	6.9 M_{w}		Large surface ruptures produced. Limited damage. Aftershock of the 7.3 quake.		
March 23, 1959	Dixie Valley	6.0 M_{w}		Aftershock.		
June 29, 1992	Nevada Test Site	5.4 M_{s}		Department of Energy buildings at the Nevada Test Site sustained considerable damage.		
September 2, 1992	St. George	5.9 M_{w}		A large landslide destroyed three homes and partially buried State Route 9.	1992 St. George earthquake	
February 21, 2008	Wells	5.9–6.0 M_{w}		Three injured and at least 20 buildings seriously damaged. An additional 700 buildings had minor damage.	2008 Wells earthquake	
April 26, 2008	Reno	5.1 M_{L}		Minor damage in Reno.	2008 Reno earthquakes	
July 4, 2019	Ridgecrest	6.4 M_{w}	1	Twenty people injured and many houses damaged. One person killed in Pahrump when he was pinned under a jeep he was working on. Foreshock to the 7.1 quake the next day.		
July 5, 2019	Ridgecrest	7.1 M_{w}		Five people injured and 3,000 left without power. Gas leaks and fires broke out in Ridgecrest and Trona.	2019 Ridgecrest earthquakes	
May 15, 2020	Monte Cristo Range	6.5 M_{w}		US 95 suffered some damage.	2020 Monte Cristo Range earthquake	

== See also ==
- List of earthquakes in Utah
- List of earthquakes in California
- List of earthquakes in the United States
