= Andrew Fire (2004) =

2004 wildfire in Nevada

- Date: August 25 – August 27, 2004 (2 days)
- Location: North of Washoe Lake, Washoe County, Nevada
- Coordinates: 39.346242°N 119.747179°W

Statistics
- Burned area: 2,744 acres (1,110 ha)
- Land use: Federal, private

Impacts
- Deaths: 0
- Injuries: 1 civilian (Note: Indirect injury from a vehicle accident)
- Structures destroyed: 6 primary 7 outbuildings
- Cost: $1.4 million 2004 USD (suppression)

Ignition
- Cause: Target shooting
- Motive: Accidental

Map
- Location within Nevada

The Andrew Fire was a wildfire that burned in Pleasant Valley, Washoe County, Nevada. The fire ignited on August 25, 2004 from sparks flying off rocks during target shooting and spread to 2,744 acres (1,110 ha). The fire destroyed six primary structures, seven outbuildings, and twenty-two vehicles, led to one indirect injury, and cost $1.4 million 2004 USD in suppression costs.

== Background ==
On August 25, 2004, winds gusted up to 45 miles per hour (72 km/h). On August 26, a weather front moved through the area, which caused strong winds but lowered temperatures. The Andrew Fire primarily burned in flash fuels, ground vegetation that cools off rapidly after heating up. A rapid aerial firefighting response occurred because at the time, there were no other large fires across the Western United States.

== Cause ==
Around 12 pm on August 25, 2004, three men travelling from Canada were participating in target shooting activities. One of the men, Armand Otis, shot a .223 caliber: the bullet hit rocks and sparks flew off, igniting the fire. Otis was not charged.

== Progression ==
The three men tried extinguishing the Andrew Fire, they eventually called 911 at 12:40 pm. Fire crews in Storey County began structure protection efforts in Virginia City Highlands. U.S. Route 395 was closed by 2:30 pm. Evacuations were expanded at 3:40 and 4:15 pm. Fire crews closed Bowers Mansion Regional Park as a command post, U.S. 395 reopened soon after. Around 7 pm, State Route 341 reopened, and some evacuations were lifted. Crews achieved 10% containment that evening. The Andrew Fire grew to 2,693 acres (1,090 ha) that morning. Crews reached 75% containment, and all roads reopened and all evacuations were lifted. 555 firefighters were combatting the fire. A type one incident management team assumed control that evening. The fire reached 100% containment on August 27 at a size of 2,477 acres (1,002 ha). The state of emergency was terminated on August 30.

== Effects ==
The Andrew Fire threatened 350 structures. Ultimately, it destroyed six residential structures, seven outbuildings, and twenty-two vehicles. One woman was injured. While evacuating, low visibility due to smoke caused her to collide with a fire engine.

Hundreds of residences and cattle were evacuated. Evacuation centers were located at Galena High School and Virginia City High School. U.S. 395 and State Route 341 were temporarily closed on August 25.

== See also ==
- Davis Fire
- Little Valley Fire
- Washoe Drive Fire
