= 2020 Monte Cristo Range earthquake =

Earthquake in Nevada, United States

- Location within Nevada
- UTC time: 2020-05-15 11:03:27
- ISC event: 618259420
- USGS-ANSS: ComCat
- Local date: May 15, 2020
- Local time: 4:03 a.m. PT
- Magnitude: 6.5 M_{w}
- Depth: 2.7 km (1.7 mi)
- Epicenter: 38.169°N 117.850°W
- Fault: Walker Lane Seismic Zone
- Type: Strike-slip
- Areas affected: Nevada
- Max. intensity: MMI VIII (Severe)
- Aftershocks: 23,314+ (As of September 22, 2021)
- Casualties: 0

On May 15, 2020, at 4:03:27 local time, a magnitude 6.5 earthquake struck ~35 miles (56 km) west of Tonopah, Nevada in the Monte Cristo Range near the California-Nevada border. It was Nevada's largest earthquake in 66 years.

== Geology ==
Southwestern Nevada lies within a complex zone of distributed faulting known as the Walker Lane, which carries up to a quarter of the motion of the North American plate relative to the Pacific plate. It extends from the Garlock Fault in the southeast along the northeastern flank of the Sierra Nevada, running parallel to the California–Nevada boundary. The central Walker Lane is characterized by a zone of west–east trending left-lateral strike-slip faults that link northwest–southeast trending dominantly right-lateral strike-slip faults.

== Earthquake ==
The earthquake had a magnitude of 6.5 M_{L} and a hypocentral depth of only 2.8 km (1.7 mi). Shaking was felt throughout California and Nevada, with some reports from as far as San Francisco, Los Angeles, and Salt Lake City. The estimated maximum intensity of shaking was rated as VIII (Severe) on the Modified Mercalli intensity scale. The magnitude was initially reported as M 6.4, but was upgraded about 1 hour later by USGS to its current figure. More than 22,300 people reported feeling the earthquake.

The focal mechanism of the earthquake suggests either left-lateral strike-slip faulting on a west–east trending fault or right-lateral faulting on a north–south trending fault. The distribution of aftershocks supports the first of these options. The earthquake lies close to the projected eastward continuation of the Candelaria fault, which is known to have been active during the Quaternary period. It also lies close to the northern end of the north–south trending Eastern Columbus Salt Marsh fault.

== Aftershocks ==
Within the first 5 hours proceeding the main shock, there were 6 aftershocks measuring magnitude 4.5 or higher, the highest being a 5.1.

On November 13, at 1:13 a.m. local time, a magnitude 5.3 aftershock took place. It is the largest aftershock of the sequence.

== Impacts ==
Since the earthquake occurred in a remote and relatively uninhabited area, few people were exposed to severe shaking, hence no casualties occurred. The earthquake cracked U.S. Route 95 between Reno and Las Vegas, causing it to be temporarily closed. The highway was reopened 10 hours after repair operations. Several post-earthquake field reconnaissance teams documented surface fault expressions, rock falls, subsidence features, and other geologic and geotechnical effects in the Columbus Salt Marsh to the west of U.S. Route 95 and surrounding areas. In Tonopah, displaced items, broken windows, cracked asphalt, masonry, and drywall were reported.

== See also ==
- List of earthquakes in 2020
- List of earthquakes in the United States
- List of earthquakes in Nevada
