= Little Valley Fire =

2016 wildfire in Nevada, US

- The Little Valley Fire burning on the morning of October 14, 2016
- Date: October 4 –; October 7, 2016 (Note: Small test fires occurred until October 13.); (3 days, prescribed burn); October 14 –; October 19, 2016; (5 days, wildfire)
- Location: Washoe Valley, Washoe County, Nevada, US
- Coordinates: 39°15′9″N 119°52′36″W

Statistics
- Burned area: 2,291 acres (927 ha; 9.27 km^{2})

Impacts
- Deaths: 0
- Injuries: 4 firefighters (smoke inhalation)
- Structures destroyed: 23 residential, 17 outbuildings
- Cost: $4 million (suppression) $25 million (settlements) $80 million (estimated property damage)

Ignition
- Cause: Escaped prescribed burn

Map
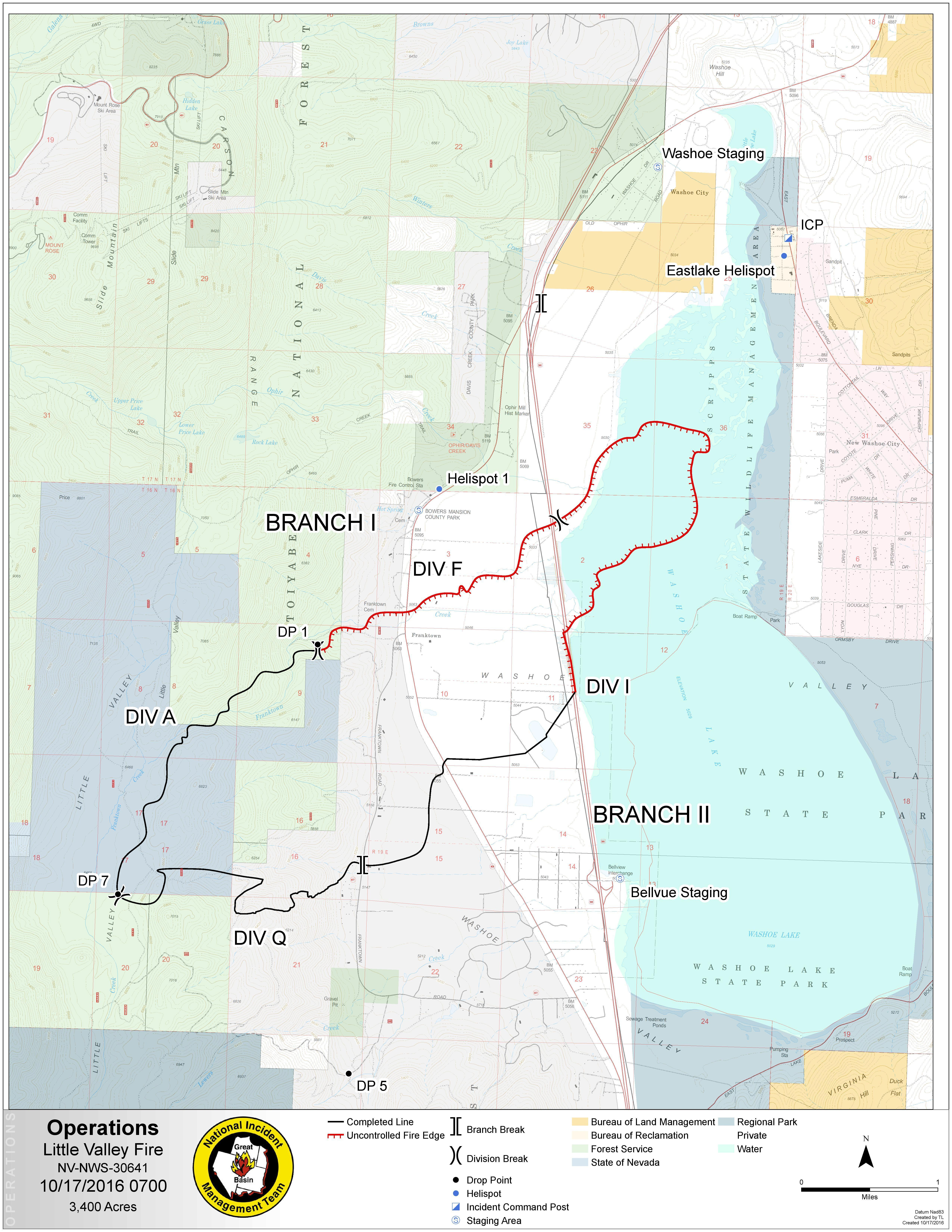
- Perimeter map of the fire on October 17

The Little Valley Fire was a fast–moving wildfire that burned in Washoe Valley, Nevada, United States, in October 2016. The Nevada Division of Forestry (NDF) conducted the Little Valley prescribed burn from October 4 to October 7, with small test fires continuing until October 13, but strong winds carried embers out of the burn area and ignited the fire on October 14. Investigators determined the prescribed burn was understaffed and poorly monitored. The fire burned 2,291 acres (927 ha; 9.27 km^{2}), destroyed 23 residential structures and 17 outbuildings, and caused four firefighter injuries due to smoke inhalation.

After the prescribed burn operations ended on October 7, smaller burn operations occurred until October 13, and were extinguished immediately. Smoke was reported in the fire's area at 1:23 am on October 14, but the call was reported "unfounded" by the responding units. The Little Valley Fire rapidly spread that day, scorching 750 acres (300 ha; 3.0 km^{2}) and eighteen homes. Rain assisted suppression efforts on October 15, and while size jumped to 3,460 acres (1,400 ha; 14.0 km^{2}), containment (Note: Containment measures control lines around a fire's perimeter that the fire should not cross. When a fire reaches 100% containment, a line has been built around the fire perimeter. Containment does not mean a hazard no longer exists in or around the fire perimeter or the fire has stopped burning.) increased to 20%. Strong winds remained problematic for suppression efforts, and 500 structures remained threatened until full containment on October 19.

Suppression efforts cost $4 million, a settlement against the NDF cost the state $25 million, though plaintiffs sought for $325 million, and property damage was estimated to be over $80 million. Flash flooding and mud slides remained a concern in the burn scar during periods of precipitation.

== Background ==
Strong winds originally caused the prescribed burn to escape the fire perimeter after embers were blown out. Around midnight October 14, shortly before the fire started, a wind gust was reported at 87 miles per hour (140 km/h). Shortly after the fire started, sustained winds blew 16–18 miles per hour (26–29 km/h), with gusts up to 55 miles per hour (89 km/h), and the area was suffering from long–term drought, with all of southern Washoe County under severe drought on October 11.

At times, the relative humidity level exceeded prescription parameters. Dry duff beds–decaying plant materials found in the forest–were present in the fire area, and it was receptive to ignition sources.

The prescribed burn was understaffed despite warnings of windy and unstable weather. Staffing decreased over the last two days of the prescribed burn. Investigators found the Truckee Meadows Fire Protection District's (TMFPD) initial response was insufficient. Initial units stated the incident as "unfounded" and returned to the station.

== Cause ==
The NDF conducted a prescribed burn from to October 4 to 7, 2016. Firefighters mopped up each unit after completion, continuing until October 13. Around 1:38 a.m. on October 14, strong winds carried hot embers out of the prescribed burn area into dry brush and vegetation, effectively reigniting the prescribed burn.

The Reno Gazette–Journal conducted a private investigation of the prescribed burn, finding several flaws in management and monitoring. The Nevada Division of Forestry (NDF) had staff numbers decreased one third after the Great Recession, and several employees were absent in the days leading up to the prescribed burn. At the time, the NDF employed 184, but 76 were on sick or annual leave approaching the prescribed burn operation. 29 were recorded monitoring and maintaining on October 4 and 5, too little for a prescribed burn of that size at 208 acres (84 ha). the prescribed burn was inadequately staffed despite the NDF promising to "patrol the area 'for weeks' until the next significant snow or rain". A report was also conducted by the Nevada Department of Conservation and Natural Resources. While initially expected to be released in mid-January 2017, it was not released until February 15, 2017 because several employees were assigned to wildfires in the Southeastern United States.

== Progression ==
=== Prescribed burn (October 4–13) ===
A prescribed burn conducted by the NDF, known as the Little Valley prescribed burn, occurred from October 4 to October 7, with mop–up operations on October 13. It took place on land belonging to University of Nevada, Reno, in Whittell Forest and Wildlife Area.

Firing operations commenced after 11 am on October 4, with 30 acres (12 ha) completed. A small slopover occurred, where the fire spread outside the boundaries of the control line, but it was rapidly extinguished. The fire was out of prescription (Note: When a prescribed burn is out of prescription, the fire no longer operates within forecast weather conditions outlined in the burn plan.) on October 5, and negative smoke impacts were seen in Incline Village. The prescribed burn was out of prescription again the next day, but operations still continued. The burn boss received several more calls regarding air quality concerns from the Washoe County Air Quality Management District (AQMD), but lighting operations had already begun and continued for firefighter safety. Strong winds that day prompted an amendment to the controlled burn for October 6. Two separate hour–long periods on October 7 were outside of the prescription. Ultimately, the NDF ended burning operations at 11 am that day.

More test fires occurred later on October 7, with smoke and fire conditions monitored. After each unit was completed, mop–up occurred, going on until October 13. Heat was present in unit one on October 13, particularly in tree stumps.

=== Wildfire (October 14–19) ===
==== October 14 ====
The first 911 call for smoke near the prescribed burn area came at 1:23 am on October 14, but the crew that arrived on scene dismissed it and returned to the station minutes later. However, the next smoke call took over an hour for firefighters to reach the vicinity.

Around 1:30 am on October 14 in Washoe Valley, strong winds blew embers out of the prescribed burn area. Initial units dispatched by TMFPD were insufficient for the fire, which quickly grew from five acres (2.0 ha) to 55 acres (22 ha). A resident reported law enforcement woke him up around 4 am and urged him to evacuate; he witnessed trees over 100 feet (30 m) tall exploding. In response, Interstate 580, Eastlake Boulevard, and Mount Rose Highway were closed. By 6:45 am, the fire grew to 100 acres (40 ha). Approximately 45 minutes later, the fire expanded to 745 acres (301 ha). Evacuations were recommended for areas of Washoe Valley, and an evacuation center was established at Depoali Middle School. A large animal shelter was created at the Reno–Sparks Livestock Events Center. Classes were cancelled at Pleasant Valley Elementary, Hunsberger Elementary, Huffaker Elementary, Lenz Elementary, Marvin Picollo School, and Galena High School.

By 9:55 am, Old U.S. 395 reopened to residential traffic only, and about 300 firefighters and strike teams from both Nevada and California were responding to the fire. Fifty minutes later, Governor Brian Sandoval declared a state of emergency. The fire was spreading north towards Bowers Mansion. Up to eighteen homes had burned by 12 pm, but Mount Rose Highway reopened, with the exception of one westbound lane.

By 2:45 pm that same day, residents who had evacuated from areas east of Interstate 580 near Washoe Lake were allowed to return home. Residents in Montreux, Galena, and the St. James Road area were also permitted to return, but were told to "prepare to evacuate over the weekend". That evening, a Type 3 incident team took over responsibility for the fire as a Type 1 team was ordered. The fire increased in size to over 2,000 acres (810 ha), threatening 500 structures. Twenty–two homes and seventeen outbuildings were reported destroyed, and four firefighters received injuries from smoke inhalation.

==== October 15 ====
The next morning, the fire had grown to 3,460 acres (1,400 ha), according to flight crew mapping, and containment had reached 5%. Some 855 personnel and seven air tankers were now combating the fire. Crews focused on keeping the fire south of Slide Mountain and Joy Lake Road, west of New Washoe City, north of Bellevue Road, and east of the Lake Tahoe Basin. Precipitation the previous day helped minimize growth, and a mandatory evacuation remained in place for Franktown, with a voluntary evacuation in effect for West Washoe Valley. Several structures were still threatened. The evacuation center at Depoali Middle School closed at 8 am, but all evacuees found separate places to go. A Red Cross hotline was established. More rain that day aided suppression efforts and led to moderate fire activity, but strong winds were still a problem. Moisture since the fire's ignition had helped with firefighting efforts, allowing crews to achieve 20% containment. It was confirmed that 480 structures were saved during firefighting efforts, but 500 remained threatened.

==== October 16 ====
Several other evacuations were lifted that day, but residents were told to prepare to evacuate again. A flash flood watch from excessive precipitation was issued. An additional seven air tankers and 155 engines were assigned to the Little Valley Fire. That evening, the number of personnel had decreased to 667, and containment increased to 55%. Despite rain, there were still several hot spots in the fire perimeter, and while the primary hazards had been addressed, smoke was still visible. Firefighters focused on extinguishing hot spots near structures, addressing hazard trees and smoldering stumps, and securing the perimeter.

==== October 17–19 ====
The number of personnel lowered to 600 on October 17, and containment jumped to 90%. More accurate mapping placed the fire at 2,291 acres (927 ha). Moisture since the fire's ignition significantly helped suppression efforts, including 2.75 inches (70 mm) of rain. Despite this, many structures would remain threatened until full containment was achieved. A high–pressure area was moving into the area, with temperatures forecast to rise above 70 °F (21 °C) later that week. Residents whose homes were uninhabitable were brought into the restricted area, and others on Franktown Road were permitted to return to their homes the next day with identification. Thus, all evacuation centers were deactivated. Homeowners in the affected area were permitted to view their property's damage that day.

All evacuees were permitted back home on October 18, and containment and personnel remained at 90% and 600, respectively. The fire stayed within its footprint. It was confirmed suppression efforts cost $4 million USD.

The Little Valley Fire reached 100% containment on October 19, after burning 2,291 acres (927 ha). The burned area emergency response (BAER) team began assessment of the burn scar that day, and management transitioned from a local Type 3 team to the NDF.

== Effects ==
=== Damage ===
The Little Valley Fire destroyed twenty–three homes and seventeen outbuildings, with one resident saying, "it looked like an atom bomb went off. All you see are black sticks coming out of the air." Many victims of the fire moved out of Nevada. A fire investigation consultant estimated that, considering possession, vehicles, and landscaping costs, damage exceeded $80 million. A lawsuit against the State of Nevada cost $25 million: $18 million to the clients and $7 million to the insurers. In total, up to 500 structures were threatened and remained threatened until the fire reached 100% containment on October 19. Suppression efforts cost $4 million. Four firefighters received non–serious injuries from smoke inhalation. A state of emergency was declared by Governor Brian Sandoval. Just under 10,000 residents experienced power outages due to the fire.

=== Closures and evacuations ===
Evacuations affected residents in New Washoe City, Franktown, Washoe Valley, the Washoe Lake area, Montreaux, and St. James Road, and evacuations remained until October 17 for parts of Franktown Road. Many evacuees took pets, so Washoe County Regional Animal Services placed animals at several different locations. In total, 101 horses, 17 smaller house pets, and one parrot were evacuated.

Several roads were closed in the burn area, including Mount Rose Highway, Franktown Road, Interstate 580, Old U.S. 395, and Eastlake Boulevard.

Classes were cancelled at Pleasant Valley Elementary, Hunsberger Elementary, Huffaker Elementary, Lenz Elementary, Marvin Picollo School, and Galena High School on October 14. South Valleys Library was closed on October 14.

=== Environmental impacts ===
During the Little Valley Prescribed Burn, the burn master was asked to stop the prescribed burn due to negative smoke impacts, particularly in Incline Village. Hundreds of trees were destroyed on properties. Even after the fire's containment on October 19, flash flooding remained a concern in the burn scar. While heavy rain helped extinguish the fire, it prompted debris slides and mudslides. The BAER team had mitigate hazards to keep the investigation successful. Erosion control efforts began in late November 2016. Water ditches were plugged with sediment from erosion when vegetation from hillsides left soil exposed and water-repellent. Washoe County built erosion control features along J S Bar Ranch Road and Old Ranch Road. The Nevada Department of Transportation created a plan to manage waterways beneath Franktown Road. The fire also threatened several equestrian facilities.

== Legal proceedings ==
In August 2018, a jury found the Nevada Department of Forestry grossly negligent and liable for the damage caused by the Little Valley Fire, agreeing that the prescribed burn had ignited the fire. Homeowners maintained that the NDF "failed to exercise a slight degree of care", arguing that burn boss Gene Phillips should have adjusted his burn plan due to the forecasts of high winds. They also noted that Phillips sent fire crews home, leaving the nearest backup crews 90 minutes away, and that fire supervisor Paul Carmichael intentionally violated the burn plan, documenting humidity levels too low to conduct the burn.

The Nevada Board of Examiners approved a $25 million settlement for plaintiffs affected by the Little Valley Fire; they originally sought $325 million. The state paid out $10 million, while $15 million was paid by insurers. The plaintiffs, consisting of 105 homeowners, received $18 million, with their insurers receiving the remaining $7 million. Rewards were evenly divided among the homeowners.

== Growth and containment table ==
Fire containment status Gray: contained; Red: active; %: percent contained;
| Date | Area burned | Personnel | Containment |
|---|---|---|---|
| October 14 | 2,000 acres (810 ha; 8.1 km^{2}) | 300 | |
| October 15 | 3,460 acres (1,400 ha; 14.0 km^{2}) | 855 | |
| October 16 | 3,400 acres (1,400 ha; 14 km^{2}) | 667 | |
| October 17 | 2,291 acres (927 ha; 9.27 km^{2}) (Note: Size revised due to more accurate mapping.) | 600 | |
| October 18 | 2,291 acres (927 ha; 9.27 km^{2}) | 423 | |
| October 19 | 2,291 acres (927 ha; 9.27 km^{2}) | 412 | |

== See also ==
- Davis Fire – Burned in a similar area in September 2024
- Washoe Drive Fire – Burned in a similar area in January 2012
- Wildfires in 2016
