= Autumn Hills Fire =

1996 wildfire in Nevada and California

- Date: June 23 – July 1, 1996 (8 days)
- Location: Douglas County, Nevada and Alpine County, California

Statistics
- Burned area: 3,803 acres (1,539 ha; 5.942 sq mi)
- Land use: Private, public, federal

Impacts
- Deaths: 0
- Injuries: 5 firefighters 1 civilian
- Evacuated: 3,000 – 4,000
- Structures destroyed: 4 primary 30 – 40 outbuildings

Ignition
- Cause: Teenagers setting fire to lizards
- Motive: Accidental

The Autumn Hills Fire was a wildfire that burned in Douglas County, Nevada and Alpine County, California near Kingsbury Grade. On June 23, 1996, two teenage boys were setting lizards on fire after dipping them in gasoline. One lizard escaped and set surrounding vegetation ablaze. The fire burned 3,803 acres (1,539 ha), destroyed four primary buildings and forty outbuildings, and injured five firefighters and one independent videographer.

== Background ==
A cold front was moving through the area of the Autumn Hills Fire while it was burning; wind during the fire gusted up to 60 miles per hour (97 km/h), up to 50 miles per hour (80 km/h) right after the fire was reported. More than one month had elapsed since precipitation on June 23 where the teenage boys were setting lizards ablaze. The fire primarily burned in cheatgrass, sagebrush, and bitterbrush, averaging between three–four feet (0.91–1.22 m) high.

Firefighters had already responded to two significant area fire reports that day: a welder had ignited a fire and as crews were wrapping up, and a wildfire was reported near the Carson River at Horseshoe Bend. Crews were moving to the other end of Carson Valley when smoke from the Autumn Hills Fire was first visible. Autumn Hills was described by the Record–Courier as "one of the Valley's most expensive neighborhoods."

== Cause ==
On the afternoon of June 23, a 13-year-old boy from Oregon and a 14-year-old boy from the Autumn Hills subdivision were dipping lizards in gasoline and setting them on fire inside a pan, just outside the neighborhood. One lizard escaped the pan and set surrounding vegetation on fire. The boys were unable to stomp out the fire.

== Progression ==
The first 911 call was made at 2:15 pm when winds were gusting up to 48 miles per hour (77 km/h). Dispatchers agreed the United States Forest Service would suppress the fire near Horseshoe Bend while the Nevada Division of Forestry would handle the Autumn Hills Fire. An alarm notification was sent out in the area at 2:19 pm. Winds drove the fire north into Toiyabe National Forest. Road closures and evacuations were implemented. Firefighters set up a water tank on Cary Creek Court because there were no fire hydrants nearby. A firestorm occurred, forcing firefighters and volunteers to prostrate themselves on pavement. The water tank collapsed, eliminating the source of water in that area. Strong winds restricted the effectiveness of a Lockheed C-130 Hercules air tanker. The wind also caused spot fires, where wind blows embers out from the main perimeter of the fire. The fire melted hoses and caused The Nevada Division of Forestry Battalion Chief Mike Rector requested three air tankers and a type two incident management team and soon a type one incident management team, shortly after 4 pm. An Incident Command Post was established at Douglas High School around 5:45 pm. The type two incident management team assumed control of the Autumn Hills Fire that night. The fire had run up the eastern slopes of the Carson Range and was estimated at 5,000 acres (2,000 ha). The fire had spread into Alpine County, California. However, precipitation fell overnight.

Residents at the bottom of Kingsbury Grade were permitted to return home at 10 am on June 24. The type one incident management team arrived that afternoon. Further precipitation on June 25 helped crews "gain an edge" on the fire as roughly one inch (25 mm) of snow fell in the Carson Range. The type one incident management team assumed control on June 26. The fire was 100% contained on July 1 after burning 3,803 acres (1,539 ha).

== Effects ==
The Autumn Hills Fire destroyed four residential structures and thirty to forty outbuildings. One of the homes destroyed had the largest numismatics library in Nevada. 100 homes total were threatened, with most of them worth over $500,000 in 1996 USD.

Local roads were closed. Evacuations impacted between 3,000 and 4,000 residents.

Four firefighters received medical attention due to smoke inhalation. One firefighter received significant burns. Independent videographer Mike Conway was severely burned when he was in the bed of a pickup truck that stalled.

Due to the steep terrain the Autumn Hills Fire impacted, reseeding efforts were considered a "top priority" to reduce the severity of soil erosion, flash flooding, and mudslides.
