= Booker Site =

Archaeological site in Illinois

The Booker Site is an archeological site in Sny Bottom of the Mississippi Valley. The investigations for this site began during August and September 1990 by the Contract Archaeology Program of the Center for American Archaeology. Excavations for this site began in 1993 in Pike County, Illinois.

Situated near New Canton, the site is composed of alluvial and colluvial deposits, making it an ideal location for inhabitants. Excavations revealed a burned fourteenth-century Mississippian house and various artifacts, including lithic materials, ceramics, daub, and faunal remains. Radiocarbon dating placed the site's occupation in the post-A.D. 1300 period. The Booker Site is believed to be a small farmstead, with its inhabitants focusing on hunting and horticultural activities. Although the site's exact relationship to the Mississippian period is uncertain, it bears similarities to other sites in the area, such as the McFarland site.

== Geology and Location ==
The Booker site was found in the Mississippi Valley where the area was named Sny Bottom due to the meandering belt of the Mississippi River. The numerous alluvial and colluvial fans near this location makes this the best locations to live in for the inhabitants. This site is located southwest of a town called New Canton, which shows that this site is near local communities. This site is situated about one meter higher than the surrounding floodplain that is on a small rise composed of colluvial and alluvial deposits.

== Excavation Process ==
The plan for excavating the Booker site initially involved placing two trenches with 1 x 2 m test squares, but after discovering the Mississippian structure, the north–south trench excavation was dismissed. In the first two squares, it was dug in 20 cm levels and screened with 1/2 inch mesh, along with using flotation for a 10-liter sample from each level. For the rest of the squares, the excavation was in 10 cm levels. The soil profilings was split into two horizons. In the A horizon, archaeologists found that the clay was a dark yellowish brown color and the B horizon contained very heavy amounts of natural gravel. This discovery led to the conclusion that the Booker site had Goss soil covered by alluvial deposits.

== Excavation History and Analysis ==
The archaeological techniques that were used to excavate this site were systematic sampling and flotation for the eco facts. Although the archaeologists that investigated this site were the Contract Archaeology Program of the Center for American Archaeology (CAA), the botanical analysis were determined by the Marjorie Schroeder of The Illinois State Museum. With the cooperations of the landowners, Marvin and Candy Booker, the archaeologists were able to collect the artifacts to determine the purpose. These sites manufactured late shell-tempered ceramics, but it is still unknown to whether these sites date to the Mississippian period. There are no indications of who inhabited this site, but compared to other sites in Sny Bottom, this could be a small farmstead. By analyzing the lithic and other eco facts, such as deer mandible sickle and charred corn remains that were found in the Booker site, this suggests that the inhabitants of this site focused on hunting and horticultural activities. With the use of radiocarbon dating, the investigators were able to conclude the Booker Site was occupied in post-A.D. 1300. Since the site was not fully excavated, it is still unsure if the Booker site was part of a larger site plan or an isolated farmstead.

=== Features ===
The main structure found in the site was a burned fourteenth century Mississippian house. This site consisted of four pit features, one internal storage pit, one internal hearth, and two external storage pits. The structure was disturbed vandals and the vandal's pit contained an abundance of natural gravel. The soil was extremely dry, which made excavation difficult, but the west wall was completely excavated.

== Artifacts and Remains ==
=== Lithic Artifacts ===
The site had very little lithic material when it was excavated. There were only fourteen pieces of chert, such as arrow points, biface fragments, retouched flakes, and an end scraper. Most of the lithic materials were found within the house, but some were found in one of the features. All of the lithic artifacts are a part of the local Burlington or Keokuk variety. There were pieces of burned and unburned limestones that were recovered, along with numerous natural gravel.

=== Ceramic Artifacts ===
There were 481 shell-tempered sherds found in the Booker site, along with a jar handle and a bowl from a ceramic pipe. About fifty percent of the ceramics excavations were jar rims and others were plate and bowl fragments. Most of the jars that were found were plain, and there were no further evidence of filming or decorations in the jar assemblage. Plates were found to be the second most abundant vessels in the Booker site. Most of the interior color is black and the exterior is black or brown. For the bowls that were recovered, the colors of the interior and the exterior were brown, but there were two rims that were flat and two were rounded. The ceramic assemblages are similar to the San Prairie phase of the American Bottom, the Pearl phase of the Lower Illinois River Valley, and the Larson and Crabtree phases of the Central Illinois Valley.

=== Daub ===
Daub is a large, thick piece of bakes clay. In this site, daub was recovered from the floor. The coloring of daub is black, but there are also some organic surfaces. The surfaces are irregular and included some small chert inclusions. The presence of the daub appears to be used for flooring to make the floor area more stable.

=== Faunal Artifacts ===
About six pieces of burned bones and ten pieces of unburned bones was recovered in this site. Most of them were deer mandible and there were fragments of mussel shells that were found.

== Dating the Site ==
=== Radiocarbon Dating ===
Radiocarbon dating is a dating technique that is uses the half life of a Carbon-14 isotope to measure the time that passed since the carbon had started decaying. The type of samples that were gathered and submitted to the Illinois State Geological Survey (ISGS) for radiocarbon dating were some wood charcoal samples from the structure and one of the features. The two samples were averaged out and generated to the date of 575+/-50 RCYBP. With the use of this dating method, archaeologists were able to determine that the Booker site was a fourteenth-century occupation.

== Surrounding sites ==
The Booker site was very similar to the McFarland site, which overlooks the town New Canton. The McFarland site is known to be the largest Mississippian site in Sny Bottom. Parts of this site was destroyed just like the Booker Site, except the Booker Site had some vandals and road construction that disrupted the excavation. The McFarland site had some deep plowing that destroyed the upper portion of the site. The excavation of the McFarland site showed how similar it was to the Booker site. Due to preliminary analysis, the ceramic assemblages was mostly made up of jars. The ceramic assemblages resembles the Sand Prairie phase, the Pearl phase, and the Larson and Crabtree phases as well, similar to Booker.

== Significance ==
After the excavations of the Booker site in 1993, archaeologists was determined that this site was a small farmstead. The historical modification of this site does give the site a mound-like shape, which is why the archaeologists initially believed this site was a burial mound. The archaeologists compared many other sites near in Sny Bottom of the Mississippi Valley and all other sites have very similar features, which is concluded that the purpose of this site was to be used as a farmstead. There was not any evidence to determine the occupants of this site, but due to the analysis of the vessel assemblages, this site could have been a part of the Mississippian period.
