= 1914 Reno earthquakes =

Series of earthquakes in Nevada, US

- Location within Nevada
- UTC time: 1914-04-24 08:35:00
- USGS-ANSS: ComCat
- ComCat
- Local date: February 18, 1914
- Magnitude: 6.4 M_{w}
- Epicenter: 39.500°N 119.800°W
- Fault: Walker Lane Seismic Zone
- Areas affected: Nevada, United States

The 1914 Reno earthquakes were a series of earthquakes in February and April 1914 in Reno, Nevada and the surrounding area. The 6.0 magnitude foreshock occurred on February 18, 1914, at 10:17am local time. The 6.4 magnitude main quake occurred at 12:34am local time.

== See also ==
- List of earthquakes in 1914
- List of earthquakes in Nevada
- List of earthquakes in the United States
- 2008 Reno earthquakes
