= 2008 Wells earthquake =

Earthquake in Nevada

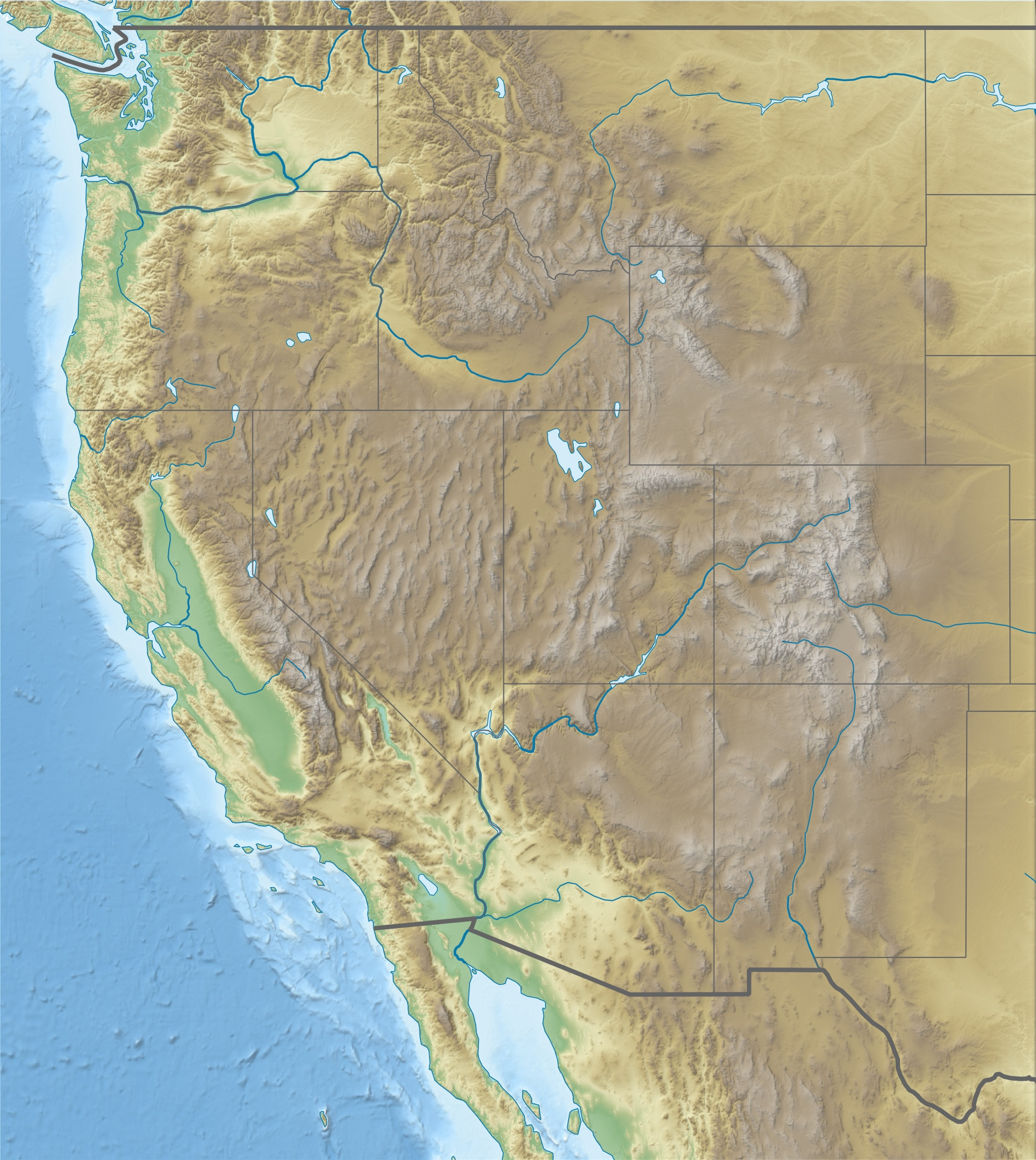
- Location within USA West Location within Nevada
- UTC time: 2008-02-21 14:16:02
- ISC event: 12942319
- USGS-ANSS: ComCat
- Local date: February 21, 2008
- Local time: 07:16 PDT
- Magnitude: 5.9–6.0 M_{w}
- Depth: 7.9 km (4.9 mi)
- Epicenter: 41°08′38″N 114°52′19″W
- Fault: Independence Valley fault system
- Type: Normal
- Areas affected: United States
- Max. intensity: MMI VIII (Severe)
- Casualties: 3 injured

The 2008 Wells earthquake occurred on February 21 in northeast Nevada in the United States. The normal-slip shock had a moment magnitude of 5.9–6.0 and had a maximum Mercalli intensity of VIII (Severe). Moderate damage was caused, mainly to older brick buildings, in and around the town of Wells. Casualties were limited to three injuries.

== Characteristics ==
The quake was centered on one of the faults of the Independence Valley fault system and had no known near-surface offset.

== See also ==
- List of earthquakes in 2008
- List of earthquakes in Nevada
- List of earthquakes in the United States
