= Pleasant Valley Township =

Pleasant Valley Township may refer to:

== Illinois ==
- Pleasant Valley Township, Jo Daviess County, Illinois

== Iowa ==
- Pleasant Valley Township, Carroll County, Iowa
- Pleasant Valley Township, Cerro Gordo County, Iowa
- Pleasant Valley Township, Fayette County, Iowa
- Pleasant Valley Township, Grundy County, Iowa
- Pleasant Valley Township, Johnson County, Iowa
- Pleasant Valley Township, Scott County, Iowa
- Pleasant Valley Township, Webster County, Iowa

== Kansas ==
- Pleasant Valley Township, Cowley County, Kansas
- Pleasant Valley Township, Decatur County, Kansas
- Pleasant Valley Township, Finney County, Kansas
- Pleasant Valley Township, Pawnee County, Kansas, in Pawnee County, Kansas
- Pleasant Valley Township, Saline County, Kansas
- Pleasant Valley Township, Wilson County, Kansas

== Minnesota ==
- Pleasant Valley Township, Mower County, Minnesota

== Missouri ==
- Pleasant Valley Township, Wright County, Missouri

== Nebraska ==
- Pleasant Valley Township, Dodge County, Nebraska

== North Dakota ==
- Pleasant Valley Township, Williams County, North Dakota, in Williams County, North Dakota

== Pennsylvania ==
- Pleasant Valley Township, Pennsylvania

== South Dakota ==
- Pleasant Valley Township, Aurora County, South Dakota, in Aurora County, South Dakota
- Pleasant Valley Township, Clay County, South Dakota, in Clay County, South Dakota
- Pleasant Valley Township, Gregory County, South Dakota, in Gregory County, South Dakota
- Pleasant Valley Township, Hand County, South Dakota, in Hand County, South Dakota
- Pleasant Valley Township, Marshall County, South Dakota, in Marshall County, South Dakota
- Pleasant Valley Township, Tripp County, South Dakota, in Tripp County, South Dakota
