= Pleasant Vale =

Pleasant Vale may refer to:

- Pleasant Vale Township, Pike County, Illinois
- Pleasant Vale, United States Virgin Islands
- Pleasant Vale, West Virginia
