= 1932 Cedar Mountain earthquake =

Earthquake in Nevada

- Location within Nevada
- UTC time: 1932-12-21 06:10:10
- ISC event: 906508
- USGS-ANSS: ComCat
- Local date: December 20, 1932
- Local time
- Magnitude: 7.3 M_{s}
- Depth: 10.0 km (6.2 mi)
- Epicenter: 38.631°N 117.910°W
- Fault: Central Nevada Seismic Belt, Walker Lane Seismic Zone
- Type: Strike-slip (dextral)
- Areas affected: Nevada, United States
- Total damage: Limited
- Max. intensity: MMI X (Extreme)
- Casualties: at least 1 injured

The Cedar Mountain earthquake of 1932 was one of the largest seismic events in the US state of Nevada. The M_{s} 7.3 earthquake struck at Cedar Mountain in Western Nevada. Shaking was felt as far as Oregon, Southern California, and the Rocky Mountains area. Nevada is the third most seismically active state in the United States due to ongoing rifting occurring within the North American plate. Extension or thinning of the crust has resulted in numerous faults accommodating strain, at the same time, producing earthquakes. Since the earthquake occurred in a remote part of the state, damage was limited and no deaths were reported.

== Tectonic setting ==
Western Nevada lies along the edge of the geologic province known as the Basin and Range. This area of rifting within the North American continent does so in a northwest–southeast direction. Extension of the crust has resulted in a diffuse area of low slip rate faults. This network of predominantly strike-slip and normal faults termed the Central Nevada Seismic Belt (CNSB) occasionally undergoes large "beltlike" earthquake sequences to help accommodate regional stresses with multiple sequences having occurred in the past 13,000 years. This earthquake occurred in the beginning portion of the most recent earthquake sequence, with the 1915 Pleasant Valley earthquake and 1954 Rainbow Mountain-Fairview Peak-Dixie Valley earthquakes also being associated. Further to the west near the border with California, earthquakes become predominantly strike slip along a shear zone known as the Walker Lane which has hosted earthquakes such as the 1872 Owens Valley earthquake.

== Earthquake ==
The earthquake occurred along a zone of strike-slip faults creating surface ruptures 60 km (37 mi) long and 6–14 km (3.7–8.7 mi) wide, trending southeast from the epicenter. Rupture was distributed across faults spanning three valleys and several mountain fronts including the Stewart-Monte Cristo Valley Fault Zone, and several small, unnamed faults in the Stewart and Gabbs Valleys. Maximum displacement was recorded at 2.7 m (8 ft 10 in), with some dip-slip (normal) offset at 0.5 m (1 ft 8 in). During the earthquake, many eyewitness reported lightning bolts and "mysterious lights" in Carson Valley. Shaking reached the maximum of X (Extreme) on the Mercalli intensity scale in Nevada, and overall, was felt for an area size of 850,000 square km. This complicated strike-slip earthquake between two mountain ranges was similar to that of the Owens Valley earthquake of 1872.

== Impact ==
As the area around Cedar Mountain is uninhabited desert, damage was minimal. However two cabins; one made from stone and the other from adobe, were destroyed. The earthquake also damaged ore-refining facilities and mines. At Luning and Mina in Mineral County, the shock toppled many chimneys, while strong shaking was felt in Fallon and Tonopah. It was felt for 400,000 square miles (1,000,000 km^{2}), extending from the Rocky Mountains to the Pacific coast, and also in southern Oregon, Idaho, Utah, and Arizona, and San Diego.
