= Cedar Mountains (Nevada) =

Mountain range in Nevada, United States

- Hardscrabble Mountains
- Location within Nevada

Highest point
- Peak: Little Pilot Peak
- Elevation: 2,465 m (8,087 ft)

Geography
- Country: United States
- State: Nevada
- District: Mineral County
- Range coordinates: 38°31′52.726″N 117°49′24.400″W
- Topo map: USGS Simon

The Cedar Mountains, also known as the Hardscrabble Mountains, are located in western Nevada in the United States. The mountain range lay north of the Monte Cristo Range about 30 miles (48 km) north of Tonopah in Mineral County and its highest point is Little Pilot Peak. This mountain range is situated in the Walker Lane region, which is part of the boundary between the Pacific plate and the North American plate, similar to the San Andreas Fault in to the west in California. Cedar Mountains was named for the cedar timber in the area. It was the site of a magnitude 7.2 earthquake on December 20, 1932, that was felt throughout much of the west.

== 1932 earthquake ==
The earthquake originated in an uninhabited desert region. Mines and ore-treating plants were damaged and two cabins, one of stone and one of adobe, were destroyed. Shocks were felt in the Nevada towns of Tonopah, Mina, Luning and Fallon, as well as others. Reports included cracks in the ground (Luning) and downed chimneys (Mineral County, Luning and Mina). Boulders were dislodged from hillsides and cliffs in the area, large landslides were reported and groundwater changes were observed in local springs and wells. No loss of life or injuries were reported.

There was one foreshock, and the 7.2 mainshock was followed by many aftershocks; the main shock was felt from the Rocky Mountains to the Pacific and from Southern Oregon to San Diego, California.
