= Pleasant Valley, White Pine County, Nevada =

- Location within Nevada
- Coordinates: 39°41′00″N 114°04′03″W
- Country: United States
- State: Nevada
- County: White Pine
- Elevation: 6,263 ft (1,909 m)
- Time zone: UTC-8 (Pacific)
  - Summer (DST): UTC-7 (PDT)

Pleasant Valley, is a ghost town, a historical mining town, and a former populated place in White Pine County, Nevada. There was a post office from March 1892 until April 1894.

In 1997, there were 8 families associated with the Apostolic United Brethren living at Pleasant Valley. The settlement was abandoned sometime after 2004.

== See also ==
- 1915 Pleasant Valley earthquake - named for Pleasant Valley in Pershing County, Nevada
- Pleasant Valley, Nevada - a very small unincorporated community in Washoe County
