= 1954 Nevada earthquakes =

Earthquake sequence in Nevada

- Location within Nevada
- UTC time: 1954-07-06 11:13:23
- 1954-07-06 22:07:44
- 1954-08-24 05:51:32
- 1954-12-16 11:07:11
- 1954-12-16 11:11:34
- 1959-03-23 07:10:26
- ISC event: 890822
- 890827
- 890996
- 891356
- 891357
- 881629
- USGS-ANSS: ComCat
- ComCat
- ComCat
- ComCat
- ComCat
- ComCat
- Local date: July 6, 1954 to March 23, 1959
- Magnitude: 5.9–6.2 M_{w}
- 6.2 M_{w}
- 6.5–6.6 M_{w}
- 7.1–7.3 M_{w}
- 6.6–6.9 M_{w}
- 6.3 M_{L}
- Epicenter: 39.283°N 118.117°W
- Type: Oblique-slip (Normal)
- Areas affected: Nevada
- Total damage: Yes
- Max. intensity: MMI X (Extreme)
- Landslides: Yes
- Casualties: Several injured

In 1954, the state of Nevada was struck by a series of earthquakes that began with three magnitude 6.0+ events in July and August that preceded the M_{w} 7.1–7.3 mainshock and M 6.9 aftershock, both on December 16. All five earthquakes are among the largest in the state, and the largest since the Cedar Mountain earthquake (M 7.2) of 1932 and Pleasant Valley event (M_{s} 7.7) in 1915. The earthquake was felt throughout much of the western United States.

== Geology ==
The state of Nevada sits within a geologic province known as the Basin and Range. The Basin and Range Province is bounded by the Colorado Plateau, Wasatch Fault, Rio Grande Rift and Trans-Mexican Volcanic Belt. This region in the North American continent is rifting apart in a northwest–southeast direction. Extension of the crust has resulted in a basin and range topography, dominated by dip-slip (normal) faults accommodating extension. Fault block tilting has created many mountain ranges no more than 16 km wide and 130 km long. The movement of the Sierra Nevada Microplate to the northwest compared to the North American plate's movement southwest creates a zone of N–S trending distributed faulting in central Nevada known as the Central Nevada Seismic Belt (CNSB). The CNSB is a network of low slip rate faults that have been active since at least the late Quaternary. This area has experienced multiple "beltlike" rupture patterns in the past 13,000 years, with the much more recent 1903 Wonder earthquake, 1915 Pleasant Valley earthquake, 1932 Cedar Mountain earthquake, and the 1934 Excelsior Mountain earthquakes having historical equivalents. In western Nevada, along the border with California, faulting mechanisms are dominantly strike-slip along a shear zone known as the Walker Lane. These faults also causes earthquakes to rattle the state, making Nevada the third most seismically active state in the United States, behind Alaska and California.

== Earthquake sequence ==
=== Rainbow Mountain earthquakes ===
The first earthquake within the sequence of numerous large shocks occurred on July 6. The event had a magnitude of 6.8 and its focal mechanism was oblique-slip along the Rainbow Mountain Fault. Rupture started at the very southern portion of the fault and propagated northeastward. Surface rupture was recorded. An aftershock of M_{w} 6.2 struck just eleven hours after the M 6.8. Rupture was to the south of the Rainbow Mountain Fault scarp from the mainshock and had a larger strike slip component. It was situated at Salt Wells Marsh, next to the Austin Highway. The shock had a maximum intensity of IX–X, while the large aftershock had a maximum intensity of VIII on the Modified Mercalli intensity scale.

=== Stillwater earthquake ===
On August 24, an M_{w}6.6 earthquake with a similar mechanism struck north at the Stillwater National Wildlife Refuge. Rupture started within the scarp created a month and a half earlier, but it propagated northward through it for a new 20 km (12 mi) of displacement. Surface rupture was measured for 33.1 km. The occurrence of three distinct subevents may explain the complexity of determining the method of faulting within the event. The maximum intensity for this earthquakes was IX (Violent). It damaged dams and irrigation facilities around Lovelock.

=== Fairview earthquake ===
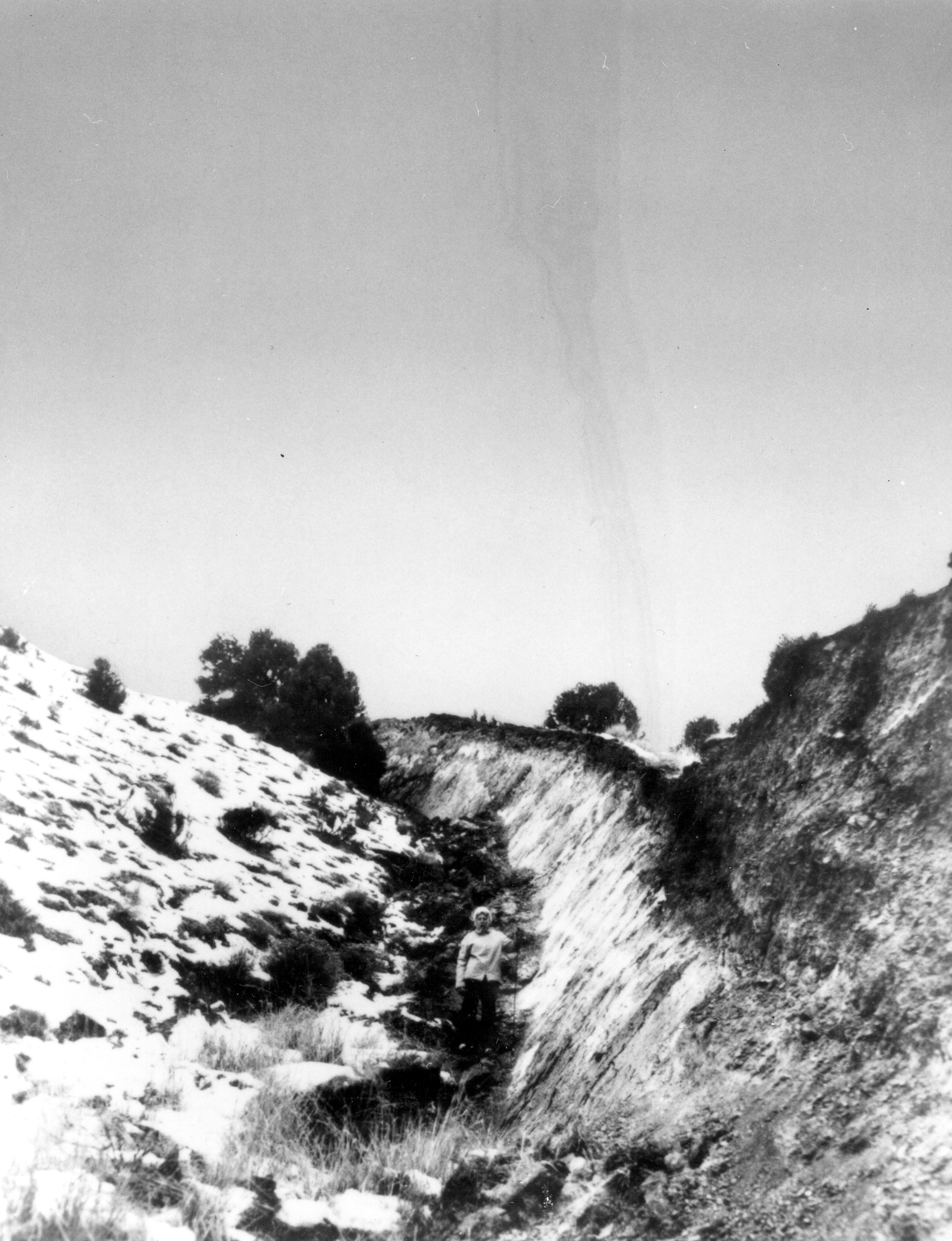
A fault scarp at Fairview Peak after the M_{w} 7.3 shock on December 16.

On December 16 at 3:07 a.m. PST, the largest earthquake in the sequence, the M_{w} 7.3 earthquake was triggered by oblique-slip displacement along the Fairview Peak, West Gate and Gold King Fault, and Louderback Mountain Faults for a total length of 100 km, of which 14 km intersects the rupture zone of the 1932 Cedar Mountain earthquake. Along the Fairview fault, this event produced 2.9 m (9 ft 6 in) of dextral (right lateral) strike slip offset, as well as 3.8 m (12 ft) of vertical slipping offset. Rake measurements along fault scarps were 30° to 60°, with the average rake being closer to 60°. Strike slip offsets of over 1 m (3 ft 3 in) were recorded on the West Gate and Louderback Mountain faults, while less than 1 meter of normal faulting slip was found along the Gold King fault. In Bell Flat, 3.6 meters of normal slip was measured. Fault scarps of 7 meters in height were seen for 102 meters in the valley. A maximum height of 23 feet was measured for one scarp, attributed to scarp-altering processes such as landslides increasing the apparent height of the scarp. Shaking intensity from this earthquake reached X (Extreme) on the Modified Mercalli intensity scale. Fault offsets were reported in four zones across a 96 km by 32 km area. This earthquake was felt for an area of 518,000 square km. Disruption of local springs (decreased flow, increased flow, etc.), landslides and mudflows, temporary mud and silt volcanoes, and a "patchwork" of anastomosing secondary cracks all resulted from the earthquake.

=== Dixie Valley earthquake ===
Four minutes and 20 seconds after the Fairview earthquake, an M_{w}6.6–6.9 earthquake struck west of Humboldt Salt Marsh along the Dixie Valley Fault Zone. This event ruptured a separate fault for 46.7 km with a maximum vertical slip of 3.7 m (12 ft). Surface slip of over 1 m (3 ft 3 in) occurred along around 23 km (14 mi) of the Dixie Valley Fault, and the average slip along the entire rupture was 1.2 m (3 ft 11 in).

=== Aftershocks ===
Numerous aftershocks were triggered in the wake of the earthquake including an M_{L} 6.3 on March 23, 1959.

Earthquakes M_{w} 5.0 or greater in the 1954-1959 Nevada earthquake sequence
Mag	UTC	Ref
6.8	1954-07-06 11:13:20	
5.5	1954-07-06 11:18:04	
5.7	1954-07-06 11:49:00	
5.2	1954-07-06 13:15:11	
6.2	1954-07-06 22:07:41	
5.3	1954-07-08 19:31:57	
5.1	1954-07-30 02:00:10	
5.4	1954-08-02 10:18:53	
6.6	1954-08-24 05:51:32	
5.2	1954-08-24 05:57:46	
5.8	1954-08-31 22:20:32	
5.5	1954-09-01 05:18:46	
7.3	1954-12-16 11:07:11	
6.9	1954-12-16 11:11:34	
5.0	1954-12-16 11:50:36	
5.0	1954-12-16 11:57:30	
5.0	1954-12-16 13:15:03	
5.8	1954-12-16 14:16:57	
5.3	1954-12-16 14:24:10	
5.1	1954-12-16 15:09:42	
5.0	1954-12-17 20:27:06	
5.0	1954-12-20 17:36:47	
5.1	1956-07-26 09:53:17	
6.0	1959-03-23 07:10:26	

== Aftermath ==
Numerous fault scarps and offset stream channels were reported as a result of surface ruptures.

The July 6 earthquake caused some destruction in the town of Fallon. Old and poorly built, un-reinforced brick structures were severely damaged, and many chimneys fell as a result. Twelve sailors were injured at the Naval Auxiliary Air Station when shaking knocked heavy steel lockers and shattered glass onto them, the most serious injury was a broken leg. At Lone Tree and Stillwater District, some limited damage was reported, such as canals banks shifting nearly a meter as well as the bottoms being raised by a little over half a meter. Canals and drainage systems of the Newlands Reclamation Project near Fallon were damaged heavily due to liquefaction from dam failure. Many culverts were damaged or had collapsed. Highways in the Fallon-Stillwater areas cracked and buckled in some places. A road dropped nearly a meter for more than 300 meters. President Eisenhower declared the region a disaster area and made available $200,000 of disaster relief funding.

The August earthquake caused further destruction to Fallon; seven more structures had to be torn down due to the severity of the damage. More windows, water pipelines and chimneys were broken. The earthquake also totally wrecked repair works done after the July shock. The Rogers Dam in Lovelock suffered considerable damage.

The December 16 main shocks frightened the residents of Fallon, many of them did not stay in their homes during the winter night. In Reno, the earthquake was felt strongly by many. Plasters fell from the Nevada State Capitol Building in Carson. Heavy furniture was dislodged but damage was minor in Frenchman Station. Fallon suffered only a few cracked chimneys. Fissures up to 30 inches wide opened in highways and the landscape. The earthquakes also triggered rockfalls and deposited large boulders onto highways. US-50 experienced some buckling and cracks, and some roads dropped more than 1.5 meters due to surface faulting. In Sacramento, 322 km away, the earthquake caused some $20,000 in damages to a water tank belonging to the city's filtration plant.

== See also ==
- List of earthquakes in Nevada
- List of earthquakes in 1954
