= Parran, Nevada =

Parran
- Ghost town
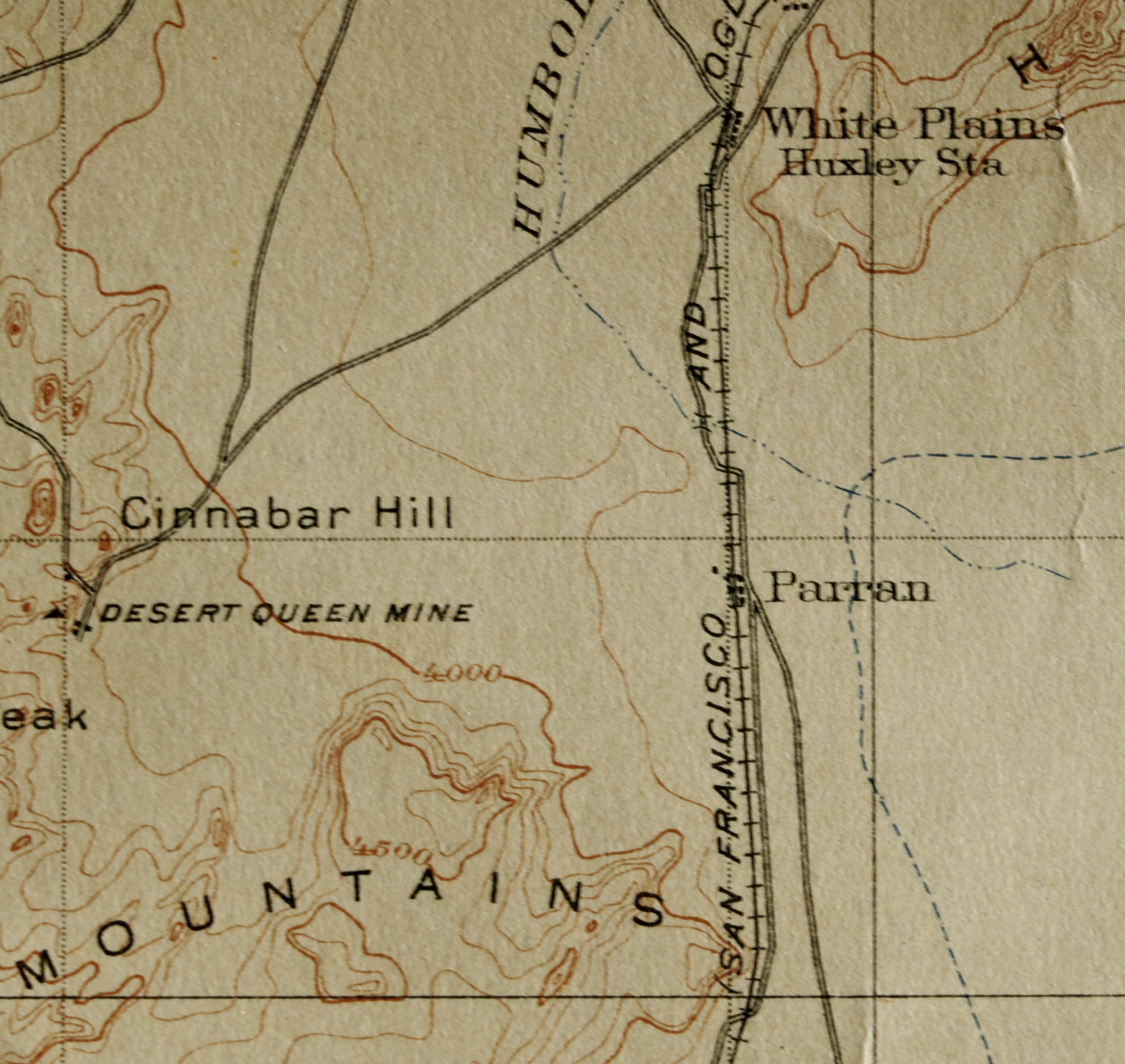
- Map of Nevada and Parran

- Location within Nevada
- Coordinates: 39.8013°N 118.7732°W
- Country: United States
- State: Nevada
- County: Churchill County

Parran was a telegraph station and post office in Churchill County, Nevada, United States. It was established in 1910 and closed in 1913. The abandoned site is currently considered a ghost town.

== History ==
Parran was first planned in 1902 as a telegraph station. The main idea was to serve as a re-route through Hazen. The telegraph station and post office was officially opened on January 29, 1910, and was closed on July 31, 1913. It was built to assist the Kinney salt works, which only lasted seven years, and shipped to farmers. The International Salt Company stopped working on the project in 1912, which eventually led to the closing of the station.
