= Pleasant Valley High School =

Pleasant Valley High School may refer to:

- Pleasant Valley High School (Alabama), Jacksonville, Alabama
- Pleasant Valley High School (California), Chico, California
- Pleasant Valley High School (Iowa), Riverdale, Iowa, near Bettendorf
- Pleasant Valley High School (Pennsylvania), Brodheadsville, Pennsylvania
