= Buckskin Range =

Mountain range in Nevada, United States

- Location within Nevada

Highest point
- Elevation: 1,675 m (5,495 ft)

Geography
- Country: United States
- State: Nevada
- District: Douglas County
- Range coordinates: 38°59′29.693″N 119°21′52.573″W
- Topo map: USGS Artesia Lake

The Buckskin Range is a mountain range in Douglas County, Nevada.
