= Pleasant Valley, Allegany County, Maryland =

Unincorporated community in Maryland, United States

Pleasant Valley, Maryland
- Unincorporated community
- Location within the State of Maryland Pleasant Valley, Maryland (the United States)
- Coordinates: 39°42′35″N 78°38′26″W
- Country: United States
- State: Maryland
- County: Allegany
- Time zone: UTC-5 (Eastern (EST))
  - Summer (DST): UTC-4 (EDT)

Pleasant Valley is an unincorporated community in Allegany County, Maryland, United States.
