= Washoe Drive Fire =

2012 Nevada wildfire

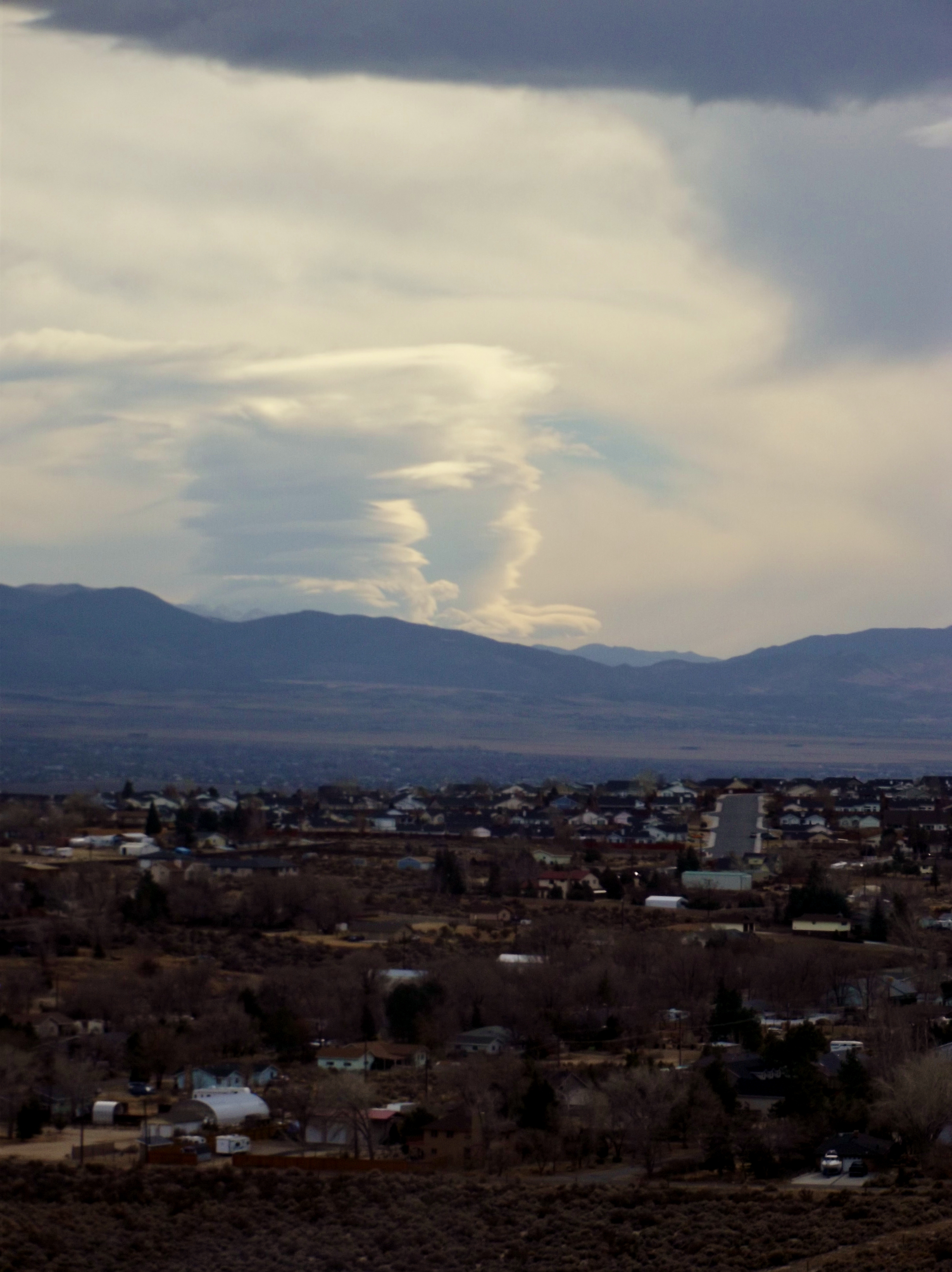
- Smoke plume from the fire
- Date: January 19 -; January 21, 2012; (2 days)
- Location: Pleasant Valley, Washoe County, Nevada

Statistics
- Burned area: 3,177 acres (1,286 ha; 12.86 km^{2})

Impacts
- Deaths: 1 civilian (smoke inhalation)
- Injuries: 0
- Evacuated: Approximately 10,000
- Structures destroyed: 29

Ignition
- Cause: Human caused from improperly disposed fireplace ashes
- Perpetrator: Lyle Teuscher
- Motive: Accidental

The Washoe Drive Fire was a large wildfire that burned near Washoe Lake and Pleasant Valley, Nevada in January 2012. The fire quickly spread, grew to over 3000 acres, and destroyed twenty-eight structures. An elderly woman died from smoke inhalation. The fire was fueled by strong winds, and burned an area from the New Washoe City area to Pleasant Valley. Abnormal warm and dry conditions led to the fire's quick spread, engulfing over twenty homes in hours. Ultimately, the Washoe Drive Fire was declared fully contained on January 21, burning 3,177 acres (1,286 ha).

== Background ==
January 2012 in Western Nevada was abnormally warm and dry. A major wind event occurred over the duration of the fire, with winds gusting to 74 MPH at Reno-Tahoe International Airport. Reno, Nevada recorded 56 consecutive days without precipitation on January 15, a new record. The city had received only 0.33 inches of rain from June 2011 to January 2012.

Over the duration of the fire, winds were gusting up to 80 MPH and it was extremely dry in the area, which allowed the fire to spread very quickly. Additionally, there were low fuel moistures and dry conditions.

== Cause ==
The fire was started on January 19, 2012, due to improperly disposed fireplace ashes. The perpetrator was Lyle Teuscher. Officials decided against prosecuting him, as it was not a crime, rather accidental, and not enough evidence was collected.

== Progression ==
Later on January 19, the fire was estimated at 3900 acres. U.S. Route 395/Interstate 580 was closed from Reno to Carson City, with diversions through Fernley. The fire was 50% contained, and fire crews were mainly mopping up hot spots. Later that night, the fire was 65% contained. Forward progress had now been stopped from decreasing wind speeds, lowering temperatures, and increased humidity and moisture levels. By now, most evacuations had been lifted, and only 2,000 people were under evacuation orders.

Weakening winds, along with heavy precipitation of 1 inch (25 mm) on the fire allowed fire crews to gain control of the fire, and the fire was 100% contained on January 21 after burning 3,177 acres (1,286 ha), destroying 29 structures, and killing one person.

== Effects ==
=== Damage ===
In total, the fire destroyed twenty-nine structures, all residential.

One elderly woman was killed from smoke inhalation during the fire.

=== Closures and evacuations ===
In total, about 9,500 people were evacuated during the Washoe Drive Fire.

U.S Route 395 was closed during the fire from 1.8 miles (2.9 km) north of Carson City to the Mount Rose Highway exit, and traffic was diverted through Fernley. There was damage to guard rails and power lines along the road.
