= 2008 Reno earthquakes =

Earthquake swarm in Nevada, United States

Coordinates: 39.529°N 119.918°W

The 2008 Reno earthquakes, also known as the Mogul-Somersett earthquake sequence, occurred in and near the western Reno, Nevada, suburbs of Mogul and Somersett. The earthquake swarm began in February 2008, but the first significant quake of the series occurred on April 15, 2008, registering a 3.6 magnitude. On April 24, 2008, two quakes in the same area registered 4.1 and 4.2. On April 25, 2008, the largest earthquake occurred, registering at magnitude 4.9 and causing damage in the immediate area around the epicenter, including destroying 200 feet (61 m) of a wooden flume supplying water from the Highland Ditch, also known as the Highland Ditch flume. The flume carried up to 50 million US gallons (190,000 m^{3}) a day from the Highland Ditch to Reno's Chalk Bluff Water Treatment Facility and another 5 million US gallons (19,000 m^{3}) to area irrigation users.

In addition to these significant quakes, hundreds of smaller events have also occurred in the same area. This swarm is significant because no known dominant fault has been responsible for the earthquake swarm occurring in the region. It is also highly unusual because the quakes have, for the most part, been limited to a three-mile area. The United States Geological Survey (USGS) estimates that over 620 earthquakes have occurred in the general three mile vicinity since the swarm has been monitored. Seismologists with the USGS as well as the Nevada Seismological Laboratory expressed concern that the increasing magnitude of the felt quakes may indicate that a larger earthquake was imminent. As yet, they have not identified the particular tectonics involved with these earthquakes. However, they have stated categorically that volcanic activity is not involved. The last strong earthquake (M6.1) in the Reno area in occurred on April 24, 1914, and the state's most powerful quake to date was the M7.4 1915 Pleasant Valley earthquake south of Winnemucca.

== Additional reading ==
- Anderson, J. G.; Tibuleac, I.; Anooshehpoor, A.; Biasi, G.; Smith, K.; von Seggern, D. (2009), "Exceptional Ground Motions Recorded during the 26 April 2008 Mw 5.0 Earthquake in Mogul, Nevada", Bulletin of the Seismological Society of America, 99 (6), Seismological Society of America: 3475–3486, Bibcode:2009BuSSA..99.3475A, doi:10.1785/0120080352
