= Pleasant Valley, Buckingham County, Virginia =

Unincorporated community in Virginia, United States

Coordinates: 37°28′05″N 78°28′13″W

Pleasant Valley is an unincorporated community in Buckingham County, in the U.S. state of Virginia.
