= Wildfires in 2016 =

Wildfire season in 2016

2016 wildfire season
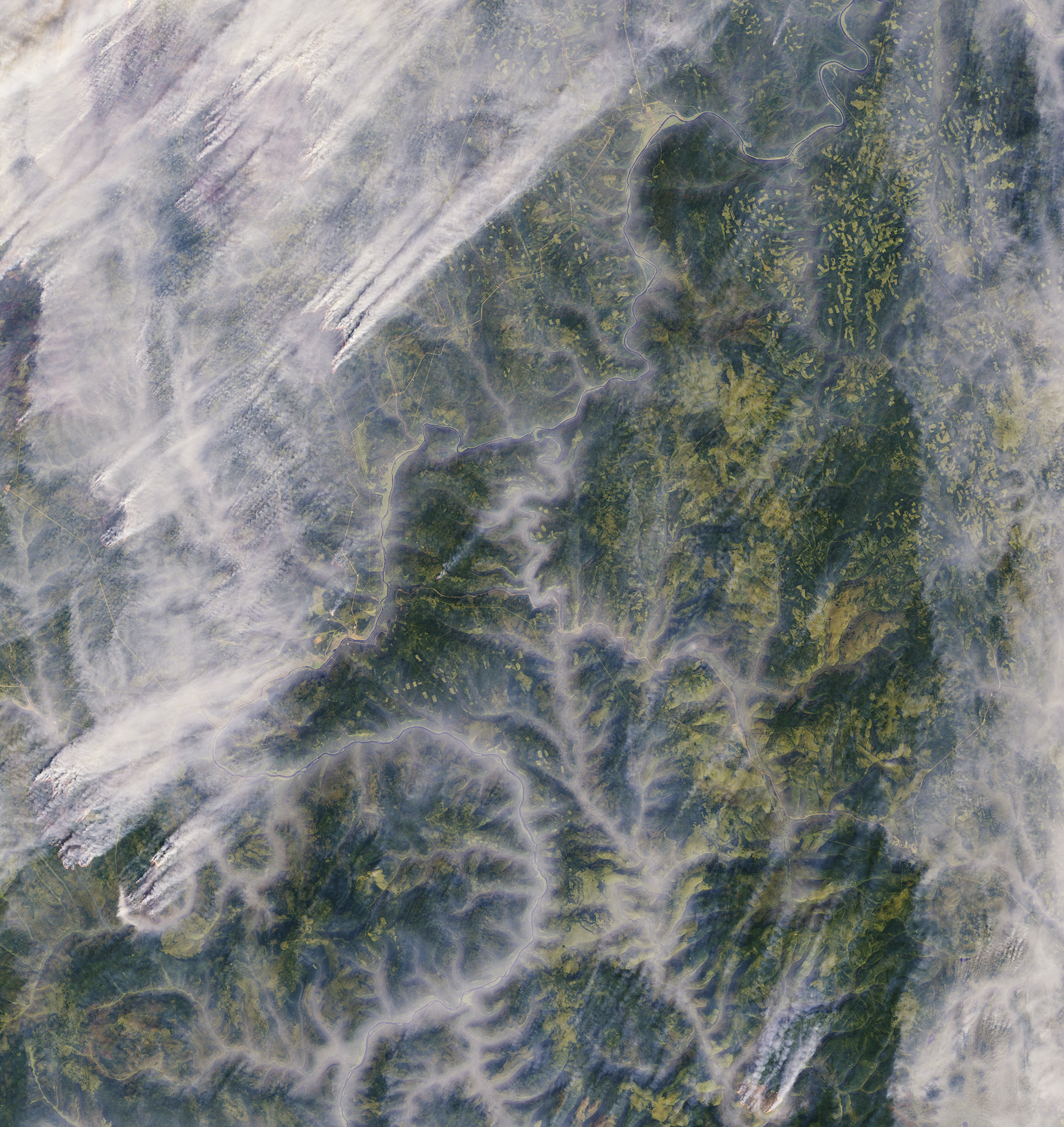
- Boreal forest wildfires in Irkutsk Oblast, Russia, September 2016
- Date: January–December 2016

The 2016 wildfire season involved wildfires in multiple continents.

Below is a partial list of articles on wildfires from around the world in the year 2016.

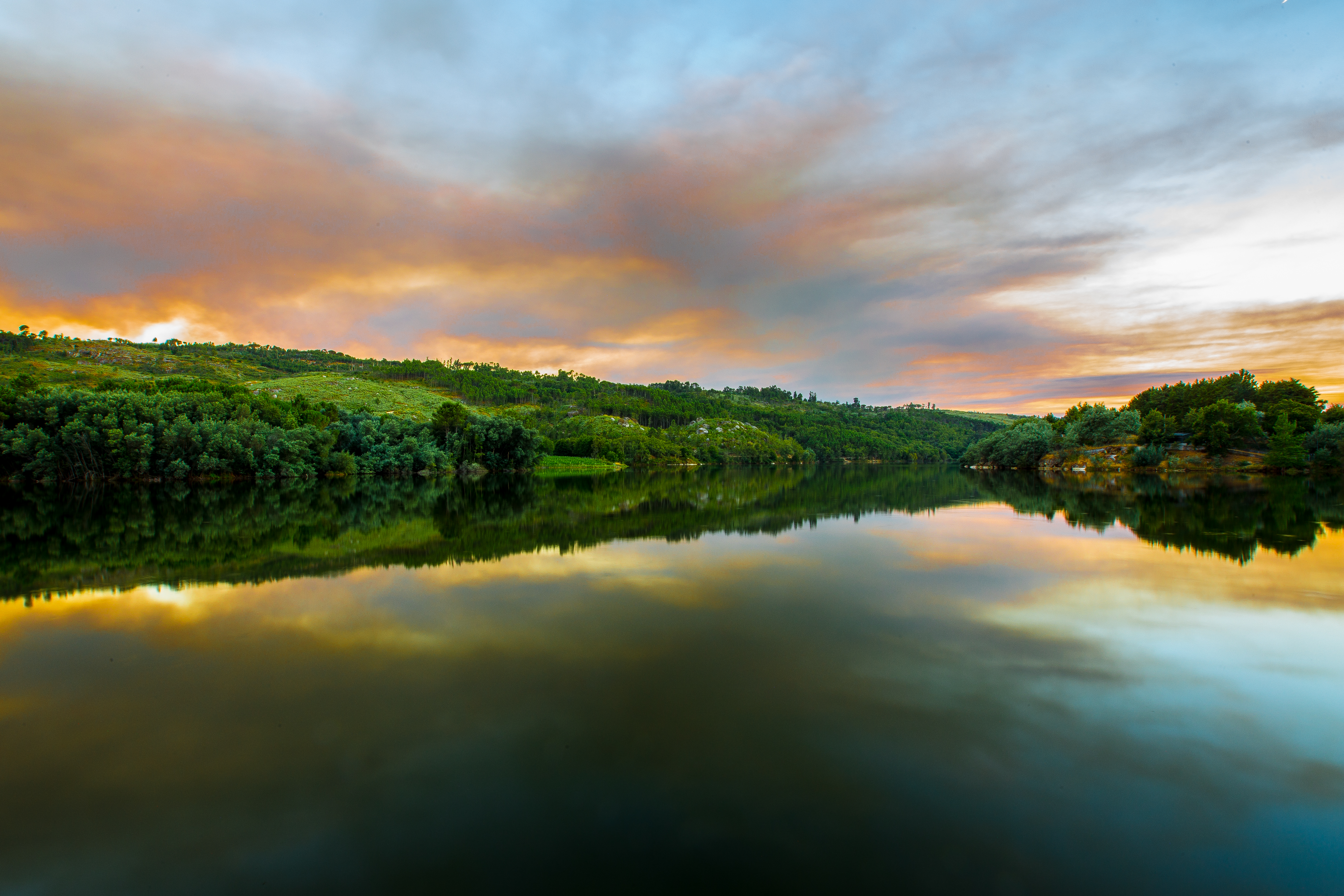
Fire by the Dão River, in northern Portugal, August 2016

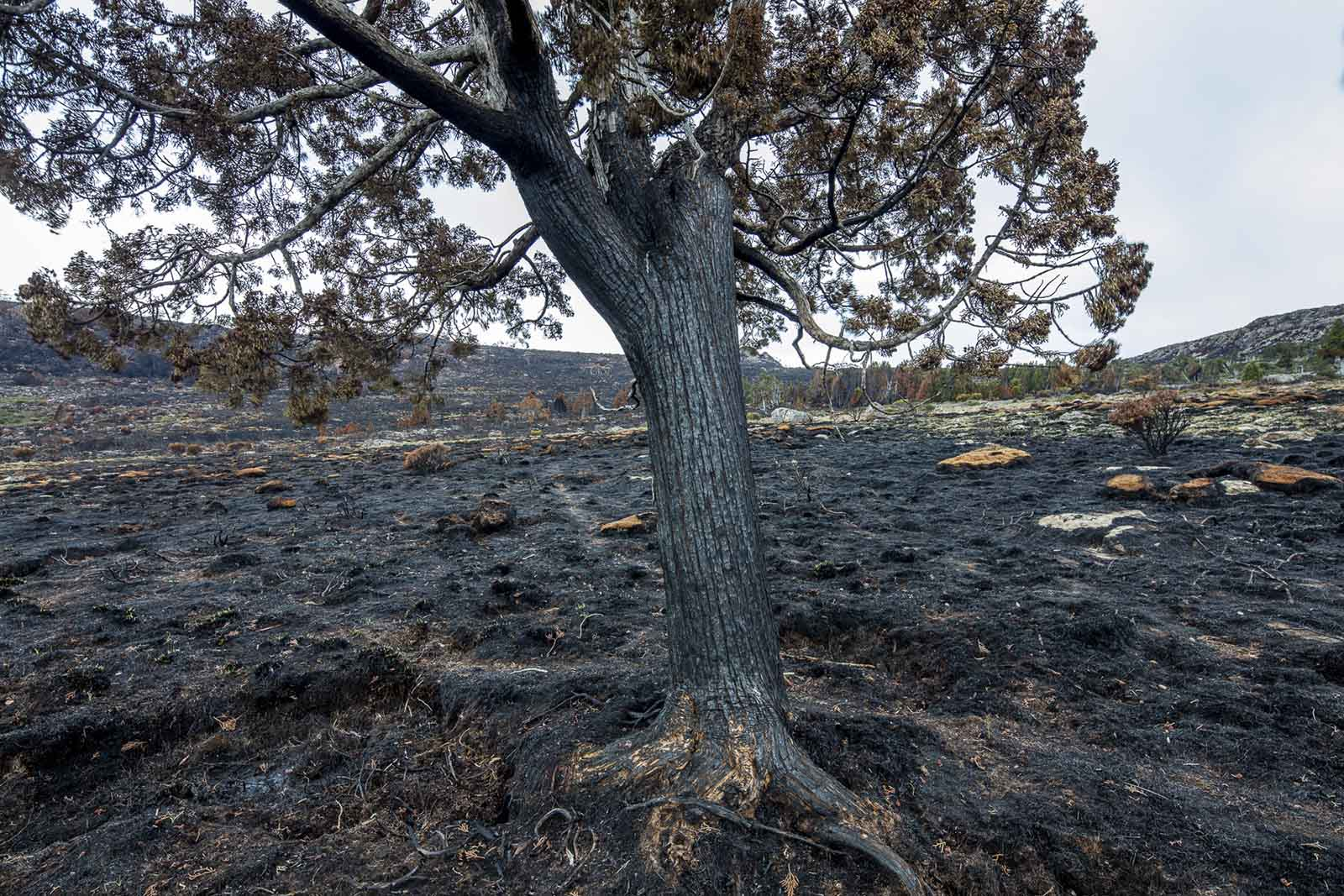
Cushion plant and pencil pine, Lake Mackenzie fire, Tasmania

== Asia ==
- 2016 Uttarakhand forest fires, India
- November 2016 Israel fires
- 2016 Southeast Asian haze

== Europe ==
- 2016 Portugal wildfires

== North America ==
- 2016 California wildfires, United States
- 2016 Fort McMurray wildfire, Canada
- Baker Canyon Fire, United States
- Strawberry Fire (2016), United States
- Hayden Pass Fire, United States
- 2016 Washington wildfires, United States
- 2016 Great Smoky Mountains wildfires, United States
- 2016 Southeastern United States wildfires
- Anderson Creek Fire, United States

== Oceania ==
- 2016 Tasmanian bushfires, Australia
- 2015–16 Australian bushfire season
- 2016–17 Australian bushfire season
