= New Canton, Illinois =

New Canton
- Town
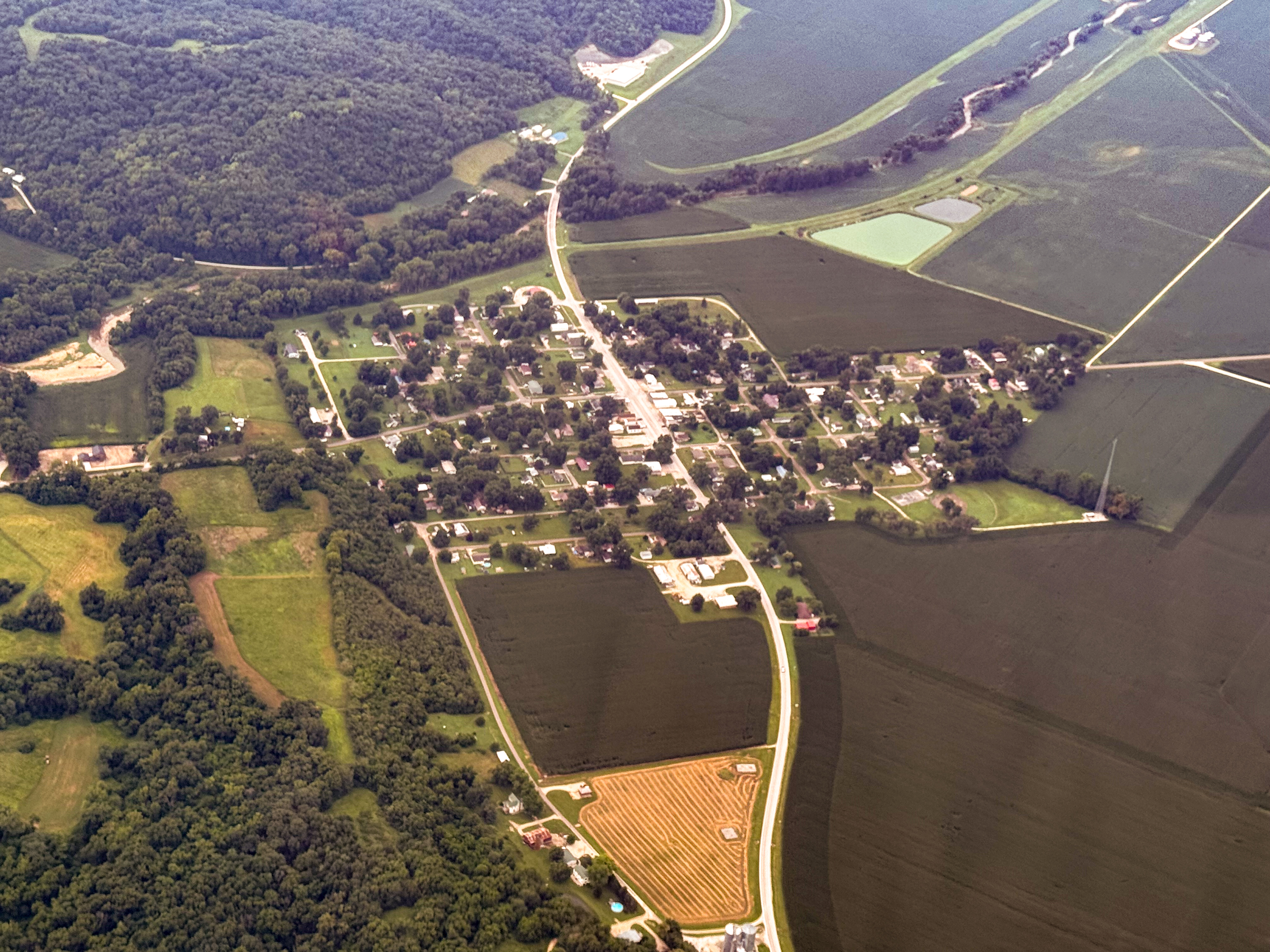
- New Canton, Illinois aerial view

- Location of New Canton in Pike County, Illinois.
- Coordinates: 39°38′13″N 91°05′54″W
- Country: United States
- State: Illinois
- County: Pike
- Incorporated: March 31, 1869

Area
  - Total: 0.88 sq mi (2.28 km^{2})
  - Land: 0.88 sq mi (2.28 km^{2})
  - Water: 0 sq mi (0.00 km^{2})
- Elevation: 472 ft (144 m)

Population (2020)
  - Total: 334
  - Density: 379.3/sq mi (146.44/km^{2})
- Time zone: UTC-6 (CST)
  - Summer (DST): UTC-5 (CDT)
- ZIP code: 62356
- Area code: 217
- FIPS code: 17-52311
- GNIS feature ID: 2396799

New Canton is an incorporated town in Pleasant Vale Township, Pike County, Illinois, United States. As of the 2020 census, New Canton had a population of 334.

== Geography ==
New Canton is located about 26 miles southeast of Quincy along Illinois Route 96. The town is on the edge of the Mississippi River floodplain about six miles from the river.

According to the 2010 census, New Canton has a total area of 0.76 square miles (1.97 km^{2}), all land.

== Demographics ==
Historical population
| Census | Pop. | Note | %± |
|---|---|---|---|
| 1880 | 424 | | — |
| 1890 | 424 | | 0.0% |
| 1900 | 476 | | 12.3% |
| 1910 | 473 | | −0.6% |
| 1920 | 540 | | 14.2% |
| 1930 | 479 | | −11.3% |
| 1940 | 517 | | 7.9% |
| 1950 | 449 | | −13.2% |
| 1960 | 449 | | 0.0% |
| 1970 | 486 | | 8.2% |
| 1980 | 420 | | −13.6% |
| 1990 | 405 | | −3.6% |
| 2000 | 417 | | 3.0% |
| 2010 | 359 | | −13.9% |
| 2020 | 334 | | −7.0% |
U.S. Decennial Census

As of the census of 2000, there were 417 people, 176 households, and 124 families residing in the town. The population density was 535.8 inhabitants per square mile (206.9/km^{2}). There were 206 housing units at an average density of 264.7 per square mile (102.2/km^{2}). The racial makeup of the town was 100.00% White.

There were 176 households, out of which 33.5% had children under the age of 18 living with them, 54.5% were married couples living together, 9.7% had a female householder with no husband present, and 29.0% were non-families. 27.3% of all households were made up of individuals, and 16.5% had someone living alone who was 65 years of age or older. The average household size was 2.37 and the average family size was 2.82.

In the town, the population was spread out, with 25.4% under the age of 18, 7.2% from 18 to 24, 29.0% from 25 to 44, 18.5% from 45 to 64, and 19.9% who were 65 years of age or older. The median age was 38 years. For every 100 females, there were 87.8 males. For every 100 females age 18 and over, there were 82.9 males.

The median income for a household in the town was $24,583, and the median income for a family was $30,893. Males had a median income of $31,094 versus $15,893 for females. The per capita income for the town was $11,571. About 17.8% of families and 19.9% of the population were below the poverty line, including 26.2% of those under age 18 and 16.9% of those age 65 or over.
