= Pleasant Valley, Hancock County, West Virginia =

- Unincorporated community
- Location within West Virginia Location within the United States
- Coordinates: 40°25′38″N 80°32′14″W
- Country: United States
- State: West Virginia
- County: Hancock
- Elevation: 791 ft (241 m)
- Time zone: UTC-5 (Eastern (EST))
  - Summer (DST): UTC-4 (EDT)
- Area codes: 304 & 681
- GNIS feature ID: 1558227

Pleasant Valley is an unincorporated community in Hancock County, West Virginia, United States. Pleasant Valley is northeast of Weirton.
