= Pleasant Valley, Antigonish County =

Community in Nova Scotia, Canada

Coordinates: 45°40′57.64″N 62°4′1.52″W

Pleasant Valley in Nova Scotia

Pleasant Valley (Scottish Gaelic: An Gleann) is a community in the Canadian province of Nova Scotia, located in Antigonish County.
