= Pleasant Vale Township, Pike County, Illinois =

Coordinates: 39°37′20″N 91°05′28″W

Pleasant Vale Township
- Township
- Location in Pike County

- Pike County's location in Illinois
- Country: United States
- State: Illinois
- County: Pike
- Established: November 8, 1853

Area
  - Total: 38.98 sq mi (101.0 km^{2})
  - Land: 38.97 sq mi (100.9 km^{2})
  - Water: 0.01 sq mi (0.026 km^{2}) 0.03%

Population (2010)
  - Estimate (2016): 557
  - Density: 14.7/sq mi (5.7/km^{2})
- Time zone: UTC-6 (CST)
  - Summer (DST): UTC-5 (CDT)
- FIPS code: 17-149-60651

Pleasant Vale Township is located in Pike County, Illinois. As of the 2010 census, its population was 573 and it contained 286 housing units. The town of New Canton is in this township.

== Geography ==
According to the 2010 census, the township has a total area of 38.98 square miles (101.0 km^{2}), of which 38.97 square miles (100.9 km^{2}) (or 99.97%) is land and 0.01 square miles (0.026 km^{2}) (or 0.03%) is water.

== Demographics ==
Historical population
Census	Pop.	Note	%±
2016 (est.)	557
U.S. Decennial Census
