= Pleasant Valley, Nevada =

Unincorporated community in Washoe County, Nevada, United States

- Unincorporated community
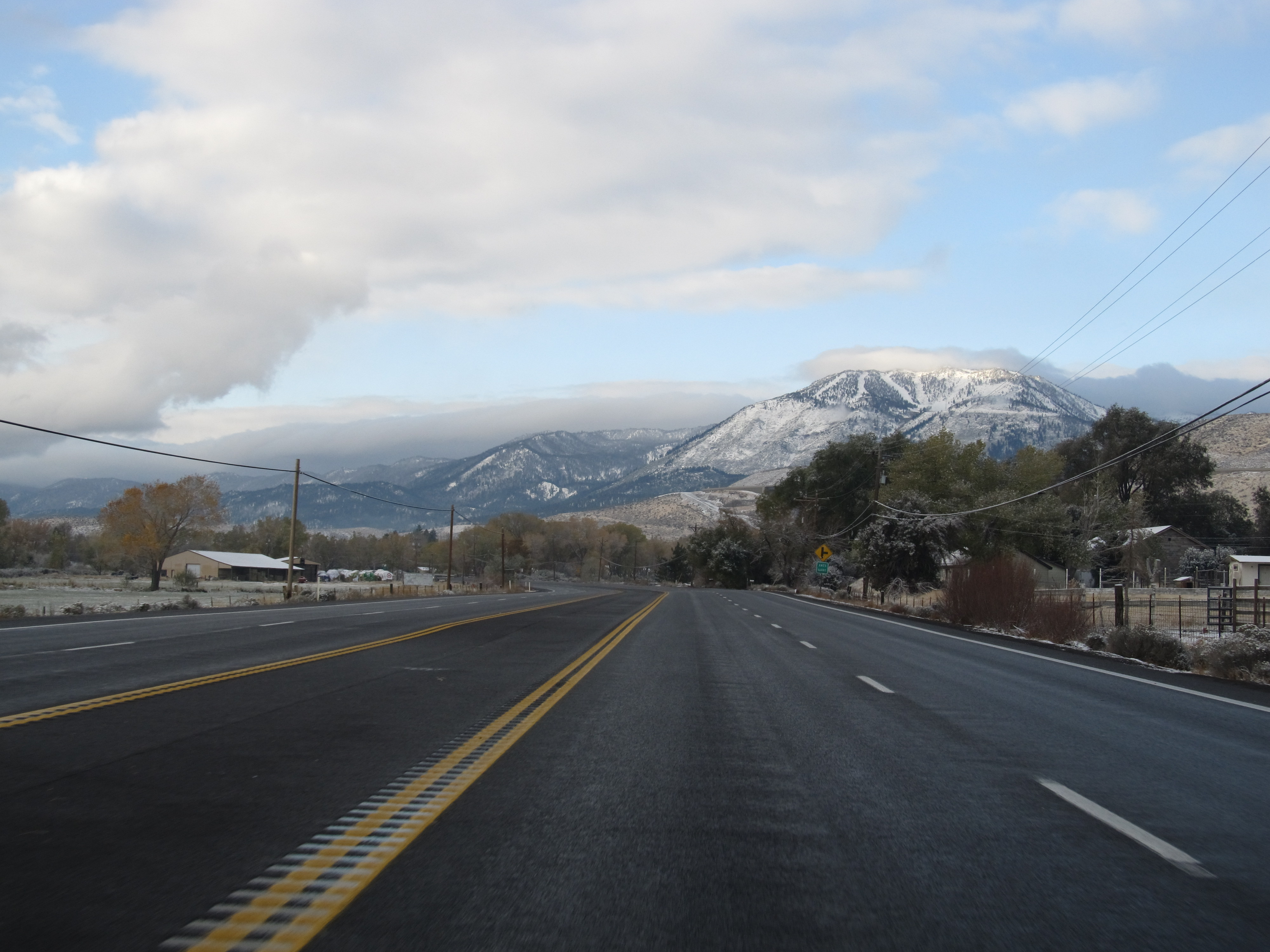
- U.S. Route 395 Alternate in Pleasant Valley, November 2011

- Location within Nevada
- Coordinates: 39°21′09″N 119°46′34″W
- Country: United States
- State: Nevada
- County: Washoe
- Elevation: 4,780 ft (1,457 m)
- Time zone: UTC-8 (Pacific (PST))
  - Summer (DST): UTC-7 (PDT)
- Area code: 775

Pleasant Valley is a very small unincorporated community in Washoe County, Nevada, United States. The ZIP Code for Pleasant Valley is 89521. The community is part of the Reno–Sparks Metropolitan Statistical Area. Interstate 580, U.S. Route 395 and U.S. Route 395 Alternate run through it and act as dividers between the eastern and western halves of the valley.

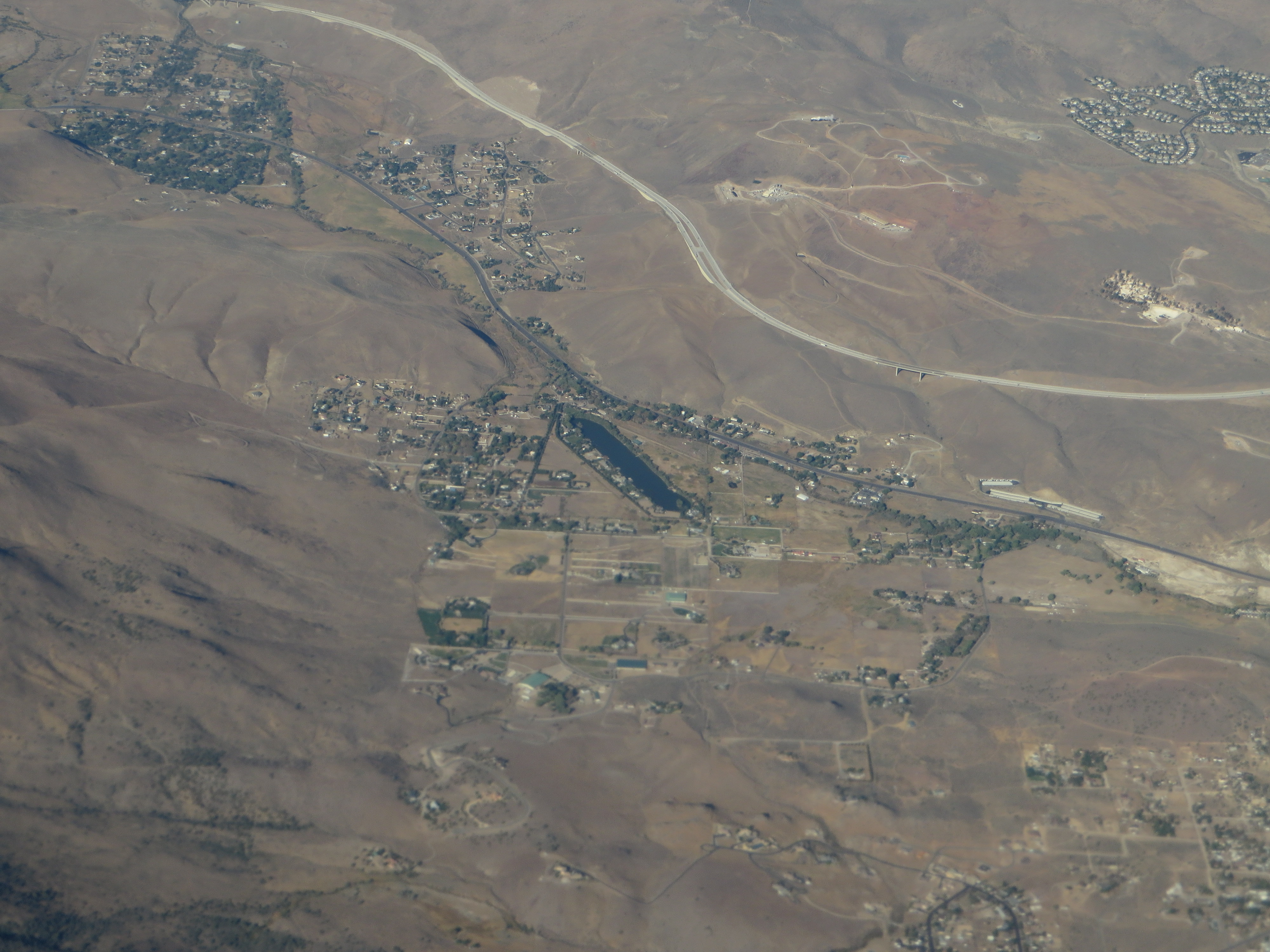
Aerial photograph of Pleasant Valley, September 2011

== See also ==
- 1915 Pleasant Valley earthquake - named for Pleasant Valley in Pershing County
- Pleasant Valley, White Pine County, Nevada - a formerly populated place
