= Nevada Division of Forestry =

U.S. state government agency

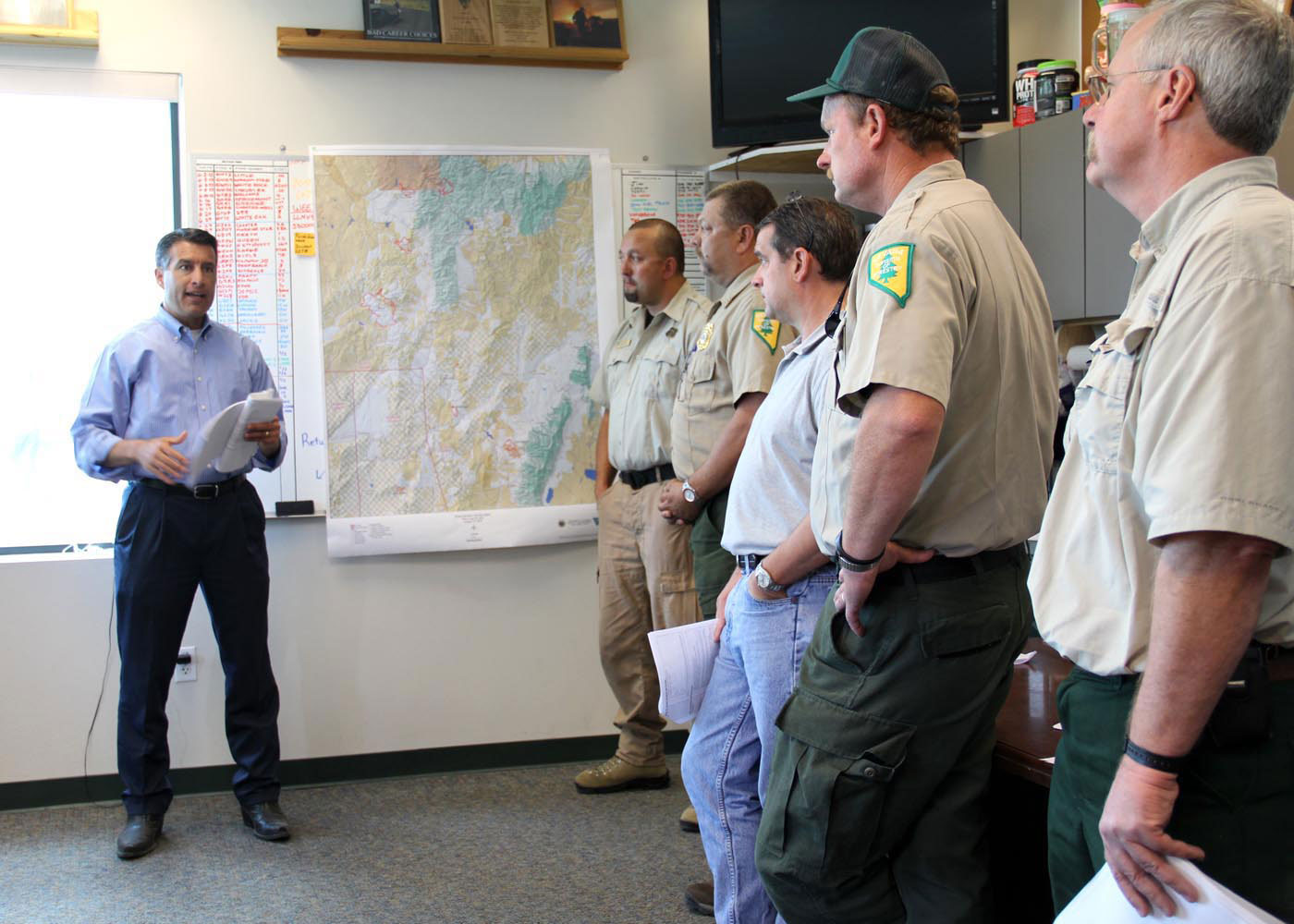
NDF meeting with the Governor

The Nevada Division of Forestry (NDF) is a state agency within the Department of Conservation and Natural Resources, whose main goal is to restore and sustain healthy forests, range lands, watersheds and habitat throughout Nevada. It was created in 1957, as a federally supported agency that provides professional, science-based technical support in natural resource and wildland fire management through conservation efforts with private land owners and the public.

The Division of Forestry is supported by inmate Conservation Camps with wildfire suppression and conservation efforts throughout the year. The camps include the Stewart Conservation Camp in Carson City as well as camps in Pioche, Ely, Carlin, Jean, Wells, Humboldt, Tonopah, and Three Lakes Valley.

The Division of Forestry's duties include maintaining healthy forests, rangelands, watersheds and animal habitats throughout Nevada. The NDF works through natural resource management and provides wildfire services to the states of Nevada and California as well as nationally. One of the goals is to try and work with both public and private landowners necessary to make investments in creating healthy forests, rangelands and watersheds for communities within incorporated and rural areas. Wildland fire is part of the natural ecosystem yet people find it very difficult to learn to live with fire, thus education is a critical role they are faced with when community developments encroach into areas that typically experience natural cycles of wildfire and growth regeneration.
