= Pleasant Valley Township, Dodge County, Nebraska =

Pleasant Valley Township
- Township
- Location in Dodge County
- Coordinates: 41°36′44″N 096°50′37″W
- Country: United States
- State: Nebraska
- County: Dodge

Area
  - Total: 36.03 sq mi (93.33 km^{2})
  - Land: 36.03 sq mi (93.33 km^{2})
  - Water: 0 sq mi (0 km^{2}) 0%
- Elevation: 1,391 ft (424 m)

Population (2020)
  - Total: 141
  - Density: 3.91/sq mi (1.51/km^{2})
- GNIS feature ID: 0838191

Pleasant Valley Township is one of fourteen townships in Dodge County, Nebraska, United States. The population was 141 at the 2020 census. A 2021 estimate placed the township's population at 137. Like many rural areas, Pleasant Valley Township suffered greatly from the Great Depression. Most of the township's residents, at one time or another, have made their living from farming. Agriculture is still a significant component of the economy of Pleasant Valley Township.

== Geography ==
Pleasant Valley Township is located in southwestern Dodge County along U.S. Route 20.

According to the United States Census Bureau, the township has a total area of 20.4 square miles (52.1 km2)

== See also ==
- County government in Nebraska
