= Monte Cristo Range (Nevada) =

Mountain range in Nevada, United States

Coordinates: 38.139°N 117.788°W

The Monte Cristo Range is located in western Nevada in the United States. The range lies southeast of the Excelsior Mountains and east and north of Highway 95 in Esmeralda County. The Bureau of Land Management manages 99.9% of the range. Sagebrush scrub makes up 63.1% of the mountains, with Shadscale comprising 36.6%.
