= 1915 Pleasant Valley earthquake =

Earthquake in Nevada, United States

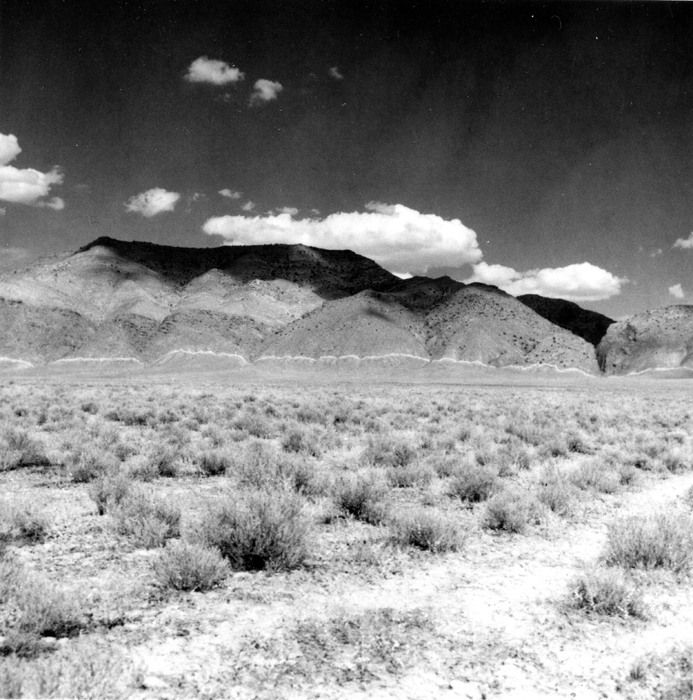
- The Tobin Range on the east side of the valley showing the fault scarp (marked by the white line)

- Location within Nevada
- UTC time: 1915-10-03 06:53:21
- ISC event: 913944
- USGS-ANSS: ComCat
- Local date: October 2, 1915
- Local time: 22:53:21
- Magnitude: 6.8M_{w}, 7.7M_{s}
- Depth: 10 km (6.2 mi)
- Epicenter: 40.26°N 117.65°W
- Areas affected: Pershing County, Nevada; United States
- Total damage: Limited
- Max. intensity: MMI X (Extreme)

The 1915 Pleasant Valley earthquake occurred at 22:53:21 on October 2 in north-central Nevada. With a moment magnitude of 6.8, a surface wave magnitude of 7.7, and a maximum Mercalli intensity of X (Extreme), it was the strongest earthquake ever recorded in the state.

== Earthquake ==
The earthquake remains as one of the best examples ever for evidence of creating fault scarps along the west side of the Tobin Range. It produced four scarps, with a total length of 59 kilometers (37 mi), and re-ruptured Holocene scarps located at the bottom of the base of the mountain blocks. Among the scarps, the average vertical displacement among the affected areas was 2 meters (6 ft 7 in), and the maximum displacement of 5.8 meters (19 ft) occurred near the old Pierce School site on Buskee Creek Canyon.

The rupture originated along an unnamed fault somewhere in the eastern side of Pleasant Valley, in north-central Nevada. The epicentral region was mostly uninhabited, so there was little property damage considering the very large magnitude.

=== Damage ===
The earthquake's damage was confined to within 50 miles (80 km) of the epicenter. Damage in Kennedy destroyed two adobe houses, collapsed several mine tunnels, and cracked concrete mine foundations. Winnemucca experienced damage to adobe buildings as well, and several multistory brick buildings lost coping and upper wall parts. Many chimneys were destroyed if they were above roof lines. Water tanks were knocked over in Battle Mountain, Kodiak, Lovelock, and Parran. Several ranches reported damage, all by the southern end of Pleasant Valley. More adobe houses were knocked down by the shaking; a masonry chicken house and a hog pen were destroyed; and houses were displaced from their foundations.

=== Aftershocks ===
The earthquake had several aftershocks which disturbed a significant amount of land in Northern Nevada.

== See also ==
- List of earthquakes in 1915
- List of earthquakes in the United States
- List of earthquakes in Nevada
