= Quinault Canyon =

Submarine canyon in the Pacific Ocean near Washington, United States

- Submarine canyon
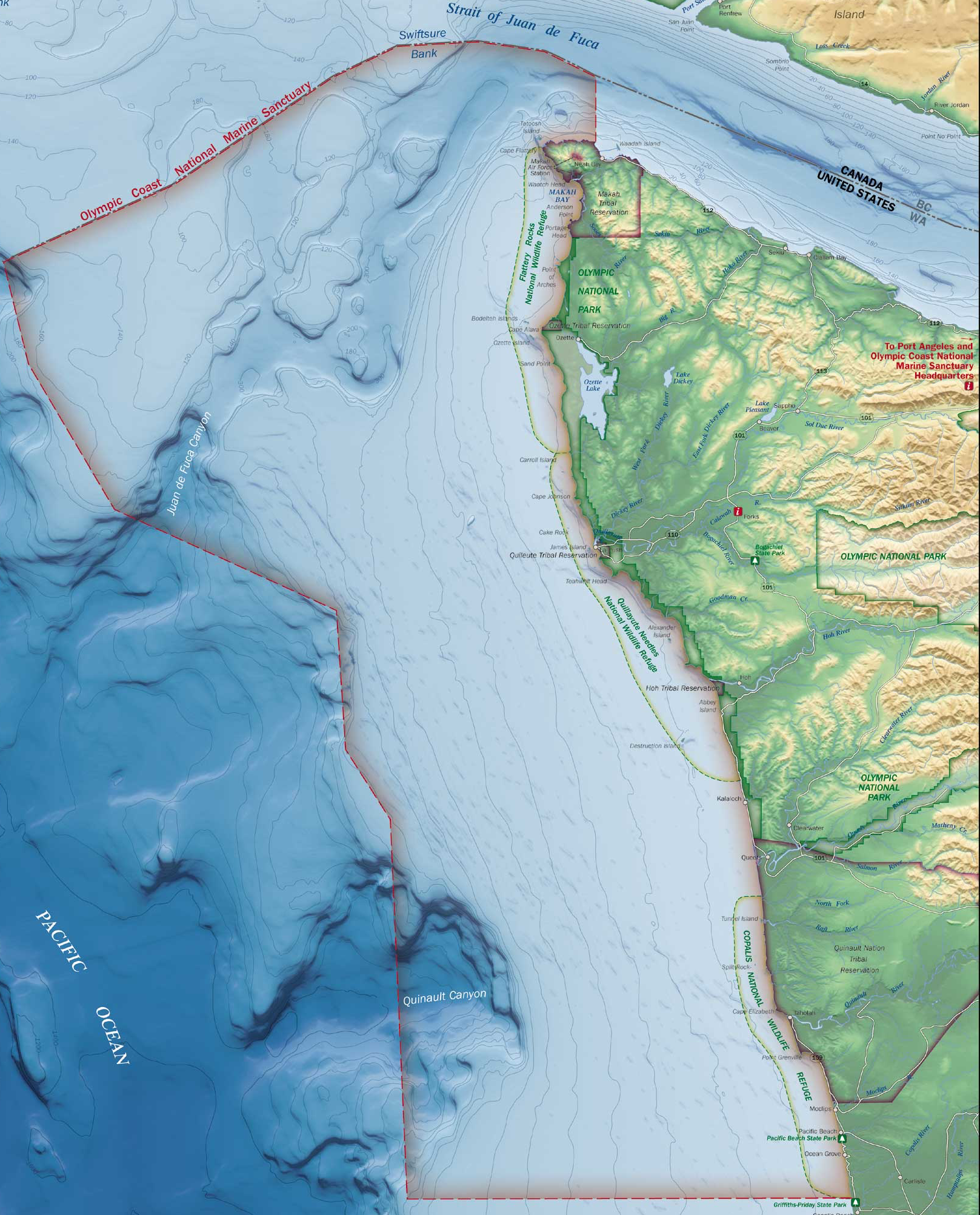
- Quinault Canyon, at bottom, a bit left
- Interactive map of Quinault Canyon
- Coordinates: 47°21′00″N 125°08′00″W

Area
  - Total: 378 square nautical miles

The Quinault Canyon is a submarine canyon, off Washington state, in Olympic Coast National Marine Sanctuary.

== The area ==
It lies opposite the Quinault Reservation.

From the map, it is clear the Quinault River drains into the Pacific Ocean, opposite Quinault Canyon. The north of the Copalis National Wildlife Refuge is also a bit east, as are a few cities and sites, as Kalaloch, Queets, Taholah, Point Grenville (a headland), Moclips, and Pacific Beach. Also, Quinault, Washington and Lake Quinault are both onshore.

The canyon is dynamic area where humans do not detect massive submarine landslides which occur on its steep side walls, and the bottom collects sediment deposited from above.

== Its dimensions ==
Quinault Canyon is 25 kilometres (16 mi) from shore, and is 378 square nautical miles in area.

== Nearby submarine canyons ==
All of the following submarine canyons are near, headed north to south:

- Clayoquot Canyon
- Father Charles Canyon
- Loudon Canyon
- Barkely Canyon
- Nitinat Canyon
- Juan de Fuca Canyon
- Quileute Canyon
- Grays Canyon
- Guide Canyon
- Willapa Canyon
- Astoria Canyon

Of local submarine canyons, Quinault canyon is deepest. Quinault Canyon has a maximum depth of 1,477 metres (4,846 ft).

== Quinault Canyon's relationships to volcanic eruptions ==
Both the 1980 eruption of Mount Saint Helens and the eruption of Mount Mazama in about 5677 BC left turbidites, in Quinault Canyon.

== On Quinault Canyon's role as a pathway ==
Quinault Canyon has acted as a funnel for north- and northwestward-moving sediment along Washington’s continental shelf, and it is a major pathway between the continental shelf of Washington and deep sea. Silt and clay originating from the Columbia River move down Quinault Canyon.

== On Quinault Canyon's aquatic life ==
It also serves as a conduit for dense, cold, nutrient-rich seawater pulling toward shore, where upwelling feeds surface productivity at the base of the food web.

Due to productive topographically induced upwelling that occurs, Quinault Canyon is important for many fish, invertebrate, and whales. High relief is offered by boulders, vertical walls, and ridges. Rockfish have used this. As of June 14, 2016, there has been low sampling, but there are 14 records of

- corals,
- sponges, and
- pennatulids, including black coral and glass sponge.

== Quinault Channel ==
A deep-sea channel, Quinault Channel, connects Quinault Canyon to Cascadia Channel.

== Exploration of Quinault Canyon ==
As of August 2017, there is an expedition to explore Quinault Canyon, something never before done. Results are forthcoming. Remotely operated underwater vehicles or autonomous underwater vehicles have never before explored Quinault and Quileute Canyons. These canyons are of great interest.

The mission is to map habitats that support many of the Quinault Nation’s treaty fisheries, sample for harmful algal blooms, to map the ocean floor, to check oxygen levels, and investigate ocean acidification.

== Methane seeps ==
Methane seeps have been found, inside and near Quinault Canyon.

== See also ==
=== Local geography ===
- Abyssal fan
- Astoria Canyon
- Astoria Fan
- Cascadia Basin
- Cascadia Channel
- Cascadia Subduction Zone
- Grays Canyon
- Juan de Fuca Canyon
- Juan de Fuca Plate
- Juan de Fuca Channel
- Nitinat Canyon
- Nitinat Fan
- Quileute Canyon
- Willapa Canyon

=== Other useful links related to the name Quinault ===
- Lake Quinault
- Quinault Cultural Center and Museum
- Quinault River, a river located on the Olympic Peninsula in the U.S. state of Washington
- Quinault Pass
- Quinault Indian Nation
- Quinault language
- Quinault National Fish Hatchery
- Quinault people, an Indigenous people of the Pacific Northwest Coast
- Quinault Rainforest
- Quinault, Washington
  - Quinault Indian Nation, a federally recognized tribe
  - Quinault language, their language
- Quinault Treaty, signed in 1855
- SS Quinault Victory
