= Juan de Fuca Channel =

Submarine channel off the shore of Washington state

Coordinates: 47°50′00″N 125°30′00″W

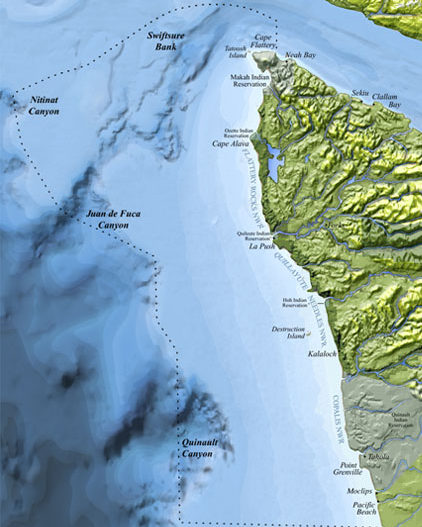
Map of Juan de Fuca Canyon, though not all is here visible. The Quinault Canyon is visible, below it, and the Juan de Fuca Strait, above it. East is Washington state; Canada is north.

Juan de Fuca Channel is a submarine channel off the shore of Washington state, United States and the Strait of Juan de Fuca.

== The geography of Juan de Fuca Channel ==
The Juan de Fuca Channel is a submarine canyon running from the shelf break, off southern Vancouver Island to Juan de Fuca Strait. The canyon is both narrow and deep and has sides that are steep. Over its 6-kilometre (3.7 mi) width at the rim it drops from 200 metres (660 ft) in depth to over 500 metres (1,600 ft) deep at the thalweg.

Along a 350-kilometre (220 mi) track, seismic profiles over Juan de Fuca Channel show the canyon consists of two distinct parts. The upper canyon is narrow, extending southwestward down the continental slope. This area has an average gradient of 17 metres per kilometre (90 ft/mi). It is there carved in consolidated or semi-consolidated material of the slope.

The lower part of the channel trends northwestward, parallel to the shelf edge, with a gradient of only 7 metres per kilometre (37 ft/mi), terminating at the apex of Nitinat fan. The lower channel represents a small fan and valley feature. Further, Nitinat Fan was constructed on the deep-sea floor at what is the presently the terminus of Juan de Fuca Channel.

Most of the shelf break canyons from Oregon and north cross only part of the continental shelf, and cut from the shelf break toward the coast. Then well below the mixed layer, they end on the continental shelf. Different from other aquatic canyons, the Juan de Fuca Channel cuts the continental shelf and continues into the Strait of Juan de Fuca

== Size and flow ==
The Juan de Fuca Channel carries more water than the Amazon River. And the Amazon is Earth's biggest river, by discharge volume of water.

The Juan de Fuca Channel reaches to the opening of the Juan de Fuca Strait, which separates the United States and Canada. The canyon is just less than 4 miles (6.4 km) wide and at least 450 yards (410 m) deep, that is, twice the depth of the surrounding seafloor.

For decades, it has been known that 20 to 30 times more deep water flows into Puget Sound than from all Earth's rivers combined, far bigger than the Amazon River. This flow is towards land, not away.

2017 measurements show this canyon may supply most of the water coming into Puget Sound, the Strait of Juan de Fuca, and Canada's Georgia Strait. The pattern of water circulation sends a dense lower layer of ocean water towards land, while the upper layer flows out to sea.

== Life within ==
Juan de Fuca Channel appears to be a pathway, bringing deep Pacific water into the Salish Sea.

Puget Sound has famously rich water. There is reason for this; the channel pulls nutrient-rich water from the deep ocean. Recent measurements (as of 2017) may explain why this canyon helps the Pacific Northwest’s inland waters support so many shellfish, salmon runs and even pods of whales.

Water surges up the channel, mixing at surprisingly high rates. The intense flow and mixing measured inside the Juan de Fuca Channel may help explain the formerly mysterious productivity of the shores of Washington; coastal winds usually bring in some nutrients, but the numbers don’t add up: "Washington is several times more productive – has more phytoplankton – than Oregon or California, and yet the winds here are several times weaker. That’s been kind of a puzzle, for years," observes Matthew Alford, an oceanographer with the University of Washington's Applied Physics Laboratory.

At 150 metres (500 ft) below the surface, water has flowed as fast as 0.40 metres per second (1.3 ft/s), showing mixing up to 1,000 times the normal rate in the deep ocean. The flow is hydraulically-controlled, which means it flows smoothly over a shallow ridge just off Cape Flattery then on the other side forms a turbulent breaking undersea wave, mixing with surface water far above. The deep water forced up through the channel is rich in nutrients, which support the growth of marine plants, which then feed other marine life. The water is more acidic, and lower in oxygen, both of which contribute to water conditions in the Strait of Juan de Fuca.

== Fishing in the Juan de Fuca Canyon ==
"The location of this sill would be an outstanding place to fish," observes Matthew Alford, the oceanographer with the University of Washington's Applied Physics Laboratory. "People fish in Juan de Fuca Canyon pretty actively, and that’s probably no coincidence."

== See also ==
=== Nearby submarine canyons ===
All of the following submarine canyons are near, headed north to south:

- Barkley Canyon
- Clayoquot Canyon
- Father Charles Canyon
- Loudon Canyon
- Barkely Canyon
- Nitinat Canyon
- Juan de Fuca Canyon
- Juan de Fuca Trough
- Quileute Canyon
- Quinault Canyon
- Grays Canyon
- Guide Canyon
- Willapa Canyon
- Astoria Canyon

=== Local geography ===
- Abyssal fan
- Astoria Canyon
- Astoria Fan
- Cascadia Basin
- Cascadia Channel
- Cascadia Margin
- Cascadia Subduction Zone
- Grays Canyon
- Juan de Fuca Canyon
- Juan de Fuca Plate
- Juan de Fuca Channel
- Nitinat Canyon
- Nitinat Fan
- Quileute Canyon
- Willapa Canyon

== External links and references ==
- One link
- A geography link
- Submarine canyon flow feeds Strait of Juan de Fuca like an underwater Amazon River
- Research on the Juan de Fuca Canyon
- More research
- Article from the San Francisco Chronicle
