= Quileute Canyon =

Submarine canyon, off Washington state, US

Coordinates: 47°43′00″N 125°15′00″W

Quileute Canyon (also Quillayute Canyon) is a submarine canyon, off of Washington state, United States.

== Its location ==
It is just north of Quinault Canyon.

Quileute Canyon is offshore, from both La Push and Forks. Quillayute River pours into the Pacific Ocean, onshore, near Rialto Beach, and Quillayute Needles National Wildlife Refuge is also near, onshore. The Quileute Indian Reservation is near, onshore.

== Exploration ==
As of September 2017, the area is being explored.

== Aquatic life ==
Large sponges and large jellyfish have been found, living there.

== Nearby submarine canyons ==
All of the following submarine canyons are near, headed north to south:

- Clayoquot Canyon
- Father Charles Canyon
- Loudon Canyon
- Barkely Canyon
- Nitinat Canyon
- Juan de Fuca Canyon
- Quileute Canyon
- Quinault Canyon
- Grays Canyon
- Guide Canyon
- Willapa Canyon
- Astoria Canyon

== See also ==
=== Local geography ===
- Abyssal fan
- Astoria Canyon
- Astoria Fan
- Cascadia Basin
- Cascadia Channel
- Cascadia Subduction Zone
- Grays Canyon
- Juan de Fuca Canyon
- Juan de Fuca Plate
- Juan de Fuca Channel
- Nitinat Canyon
- Nitinat Fan
- Quileute Canyon
- Willapa Canyon

=== Other uses of the term Quileute ===
- Quileute
- Quileute language
- Quillayute River
- Quileute Tribal School
- USS Quileute (YTB-540)

=== Other uses of the term Quillayute ===
- Quillayute Airport
- Quillayute Needles National Wildlife Refuge
- Quillayute Valley School District

== External links and references ==
- A page with a map
- More information
