= 1980 Eureka earthquake =

Along the northern coastal area of California

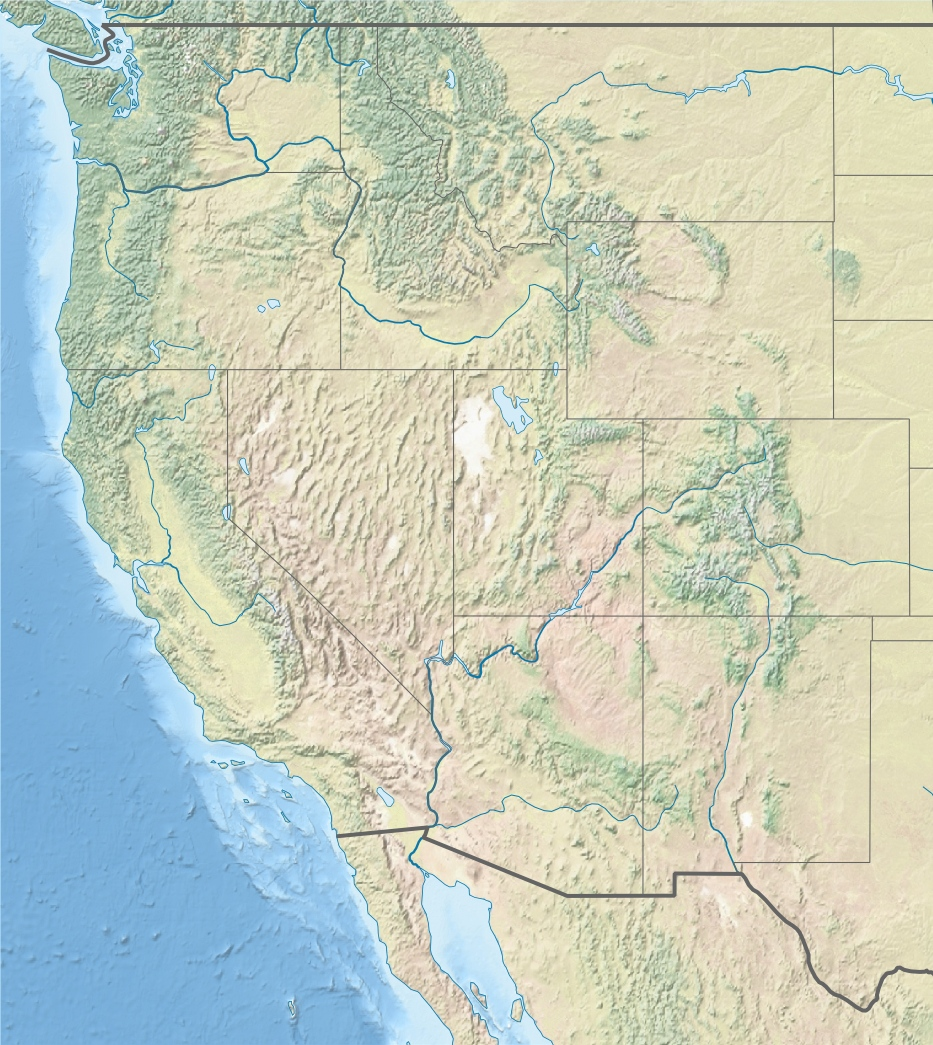
- UTC time: 1980-11-08 10:27:34
- ISC event: 635132
- USGS-ANSS: ComCat
- Local date: November 8, 1980; 45 years ago
- Local time: 02:27:34 PST
- Magnitude: 7.3 M_{w}
- Depth: 6.2 mi (10 km)
- Epicenter: 41.13°N 124.44°W
- Type: Strike-slip
- Areas affected: North Coast (California); United States
- Total damage: $2–2.75 million
- Max. intensity: MMI VII (Very strong)
- Peak acceleration: 0.15–0.25 g
- Landslides: Yes
- Casualties: Six injured

The 1980 Eureka earthquake (also known as the Gorda Basin earthquake) occurred on November 8 at 02:27:34 local time along the northern coastal area of California in the United States. With a moment magnitude of 7.3 and a maximum Mercalli intensity of VII (Very strong), this strike-slip earthquake was the largest to occur in California in 28 years. Although damage was considered light, several loss estimates equaled or exceeded $2 million, and six injuries resulted when two vehicles came down with the partial collapse of a highway overpass on US 101 in Fields Landing. The north coast of California experiences frequent plate boundary earthquakes near the Mendocino triple junction and intraplate events also occur within the Gorda plate.

Due to the regional seismic risk, the nuclear portion of the Humboldt Bay Nuclear Power Plant was shut down in the 1970s. No substantial damage occurred to the two fossil-fuel electricity generating units that were operational at the facility. Several types of sensors were installed at the site to capture strong motion data in this seismically active area, but the majority of records from the event were considered unreliable due to faulty equipment or inadequate maintenance of such equipment. Only one piece of equipment at the facility provided data by which an estimate of the peak ground acceleration could be made.

== Tectonic setting ==
Near Cape Mendocino, the Mendocino triple junction is an area of active seismicity where three tectonic plates meet. The Mendocino fracture zone (also known as the Mendocino Fault east of the Gorda Ridge) is a transform fault that separates the Pacific and Gorda plates. To the south, the relative motion between the Pacific plate and North American plate is accommodated by the San Andreas Fault, and to the north, the Gorda plate is converging with the North American plate at the Cascadia subduction zone. Earthquakes within the Gorda plate are the result of north–south compression at the Mendocino Fault.

== Earthquake ==
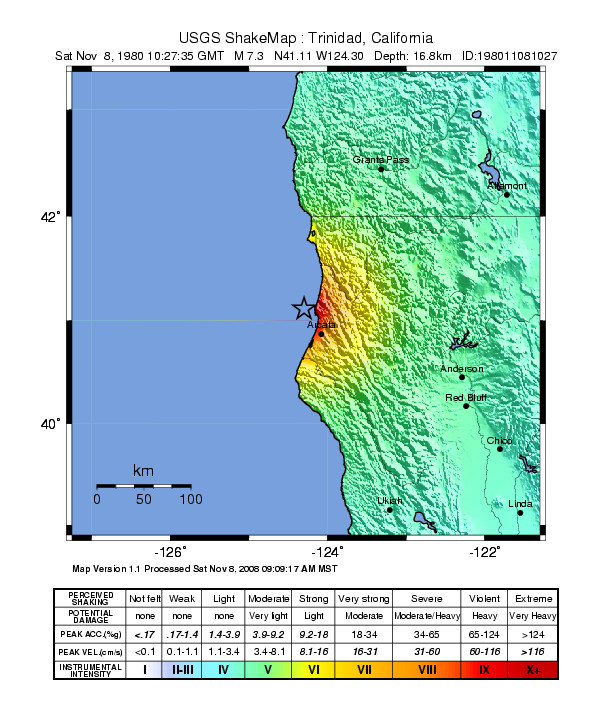
USGS ShakeMap for the event

The left-lateral strike-slip earthquake was the largest to occur in California since the 1952 Kern County earthquake. The mainshock (which was described as a multiple-rupture, with four subevents in the initial 80 seconds) and its aftershocks occurred on a northeast-trending fault that extended from near the Mendocino Fault to a point northwest of Eureka. Movement along the fault is due to a north–south compressional regime and the resulting intraplate deformation of the Gorda plate. Previous events in this area were the January 1922 7.3 M_{s} and the January 1923 7.2 M_{s}shocks.

The earthquake occurred offshore (to the northwest of Eureka, about 37 mi (60 km) west of Patrick's Point) and had a maximum Mercalli intensity of VII (Very strong). Some people reported intense shaking that lasted for 15 to 30 seconds. In the epicentral area, items were knocked off shelves and furniture was displaced, but damage was considered light (the smaller 5.2 M_{L} event that occurred in June 1975 caused more damage).

=== Damage ===
While most of the damage from the Gorda Basin earthquake was considered light, there were some exceptions. In Eureka, effects included broken windows and dishes, fallen chimneys, and merchandise that fell from store shelves. In Fields Landing, King Salmon, Loleta, and Big Lagoon areas, the strongest effects included surface cracks on the ground, soil liquefaction, small landslides and rockfalls, and numerous slumps along the Eel River. Similar effects occurred along the Old Coast Highway near Trinidad and Moonstone, where the roadway was reduced to one lane of travel in some areas. Several homes were knocked off their foundations and a highway overpass collapsed in Fields Landing. Seismic wave amplification, poor design, or inadequate construction style may have contributed to losses there.

==== Tompkins Hill Road overpass ====
The Tompkins Hill Road overpass is situated just south of Fields Landing and was built in the late 1960s. It suffered slight damage during the 1975 earthquake and was scheduled for a retrofit in 1981. The overpass was constructed with cement abutments on earthen ramps on either end and a series of concrete support columns in the middle. Eight 60 ft (20 m) reinforced concrete spans accommodated northbound and southbound lanes of traffic, with no anchors connecting the spans with each other or to the abutments. At the time of the shock, two of the southbound spans came off their support (a 6 in (15 cm) ledge) and six people were injured when a Volkswagen Beetle and a small pickup truck plummeted off the bridge.

Selected Mercalli intensities
| MMI | Locations |
| MMI VII (Very strong) | Fields Landing |
| MMI VI (Strong) | Brookings, Eureka |
| MMI V (Moderate) | Crescent City, Scotia |
| MMI IV (Light) | Fallon, Roseburg |
| MMI III (Weak) | Lake City, Chowchilla |
| MMI II (Weak) | Eugene |
Stover & von Hake 1984, pp. 55–59

==== Humboldt Bay Power Plant ====
The Humboldt Bay Power Plant is located about 3 miles (4.8 km) north of the collapsed highway overpass and operated fossil-fuel and nuclear units in the 1960s and 1970s. The nuclear unit was cancelled in 1976 because of seismic safety concerns, but the two fossil-fuel units remained in operation. The Nuclear Regulatory Commission performed a post-event survey of the facility's systems in late 1980, but inspectors found only minor effects to the plant's structure, piping, tanks, and other mechanical equipment. It was found that the two units were automatically shut down at the time of the shock for various protective concerns and that there were minor cracks in masonry and concrete, sheared bolts, pipe leaks, and slight movement of water tanks. The deformation of a reinforced masonry wall that resulted in a variable-width gap was the only structural issue.

=== Intensity ===
With an area of perceptibility of more than 97,000 mi^{2}, it was felt from the San Francisco Bay Area and the Central Valley to western Nevada, and as far as Salem in northern Oregon. Intensity VI (Strong) effects were limited to a narrow coastal zone that included Myers Flat in the south and Brookings, Oregon in the north. Damage at this intensity level included broken plate glass windows, cracked walls, foundation and chimney damage, and significant loss of merchandise. In Fields Landing, two homes that came off their foundations, the fallen overpass, and broken gas, water, and sewer lines were associated with intensity VII (Very strong) shaking.

=== Strong motion ===
Pacific Gas and Electric Company initially reported that peak ground accelerations in the range of 0.16–0.4 g were recorded on the floor of the refueling building on the plant's strong motion instruments (accelerometers). Low voltage from a faulty power supply left the instruments in a condition that was functional, but the records were not considered reliable. Three TERA Technology film recorders were also in use as a backup system, but these instruments also did not produce usable records because lack of maintenance had allowed dirt and grit to get inside. Only records from one instrument (an Engdhal peak shock recorder) was believed to be operating correctly, and with a close examination of the energy dispersed at various frequencies, an estimate of 0.15–0.25 g was given for the event at that location.

== See also ==
- List of earthquakes in 1980
- List of earthquakes in California
