= Cascadia Channel =

Extensive deep-sea channel of the Pacific Ocean

Coordinates: 43°30′00″N 130°00′00″W

Cascadia Channel is the most extensive deep-sea channel currently known (as of 1969) of the Pacific Ocean. It extends across Cascadia Abyssal Plain, through the Blanco fracture zone, and into Tufts Abyssal Plain. Notably, Cascadia Channel has tributaries, akin to river tributaries. The Channel has two contributing tributaries—Juan de Fuca Channel from the north, and the outflow of Quinault and Willapa Channels in the south. It is believed to be over 2,200 kilometres (1,400 mi) long.

== Formation ==
Headed north-south, Cascadia Channel initially formed on the eastern flank of the Juan de Fuca Ridge, which was actively spreading. In the late Cenozoic, the volcanic basement was covered by seismically transparent pelagic and hemipelagic sediment, which horizontally deposited turbidites covered. During late Pleistocene glaciation and the lowering of sea level, much sand and gravel from the shore deposited on either the upper slope or the outer shelf, which initiated turbidity currents, converting the lower and middle portions of the channel into erosional features. This led to the initiation of downcutting. At this time, apparently the channel built up by turbidity current that proceeded south, along the western part of the Cascadia abyssal plain, also from the west of the Astoria Fan. During the Holocene, turbidity current from the Columbia River sediment continued to flow, both down the Cascade channel and the Blanco fracture zone.

== Marine biology ==
In the channel, the benthic animal population is four times as abundant compared to the surrounding Juan de Fuca plate. In Cascadia Channel, burrowing organisms have left many well-preserved burrows of distinct sizes and shapes in turbidity current deposits.

== Turbidite flows ==
An earthquake can trigger a turbidite flow, and these are likely to record a succession of submarine mass movements. At the head of a submarine canyon there may be a sediment flow, which may begin as a slide or slump, continue as a debris flow, and change into a turbidity current as fluid content increases down slope.

Geologic evidence for the occurrence of earthquakes on the Cascadia subduction zone is off Oregon and Washington, and includes sedimentary deposits that have been observed in cores from deep-sea channels and abyssal fans.

Earthquakes can set off submarine mass movements that can initiate turbidity currents.

In 1990, John Adams of the Geological Survey of Canada suggested that these turbidity currents originated during great subduction zone earthquakes. There is a consistent number of turbidites in core samples from both side and main channels, indicating that each turbidity current was likely caused at the same time, by the same event which may be the 1700 Cascadia earthquake.

Of the turbidites, large storms are not the likely source.

Ash from the eruption of Mount Mazama, which gave modern-day Oregon its Crater Lake, reached Cascadia Channel via the continental shelf and submarine canyons.

== Local geography ==
- Abyssal fan
- Astoria Canyon
- Astoria Fan
- Barkely Canyon
- Cascadia Channel
- Cascadia subduction zone
- Clayoquot Canyon
- Father Charles Canyon
- Grays Canyon
- Guide Canyon
- Juan de Fuca Canyon
- Juan de Fuca plate
- Juan de Fuca Channel
- Loudon Canyon
- Nitinat Canyon
- Nitinat Fan
- Quileute Canyon
- Quinault Canyon
- Willapa Canyon

== External links and references ==
- Undersea Features page
- One link, an FTP
- Cascadia Paleoseismic History Based on Turbidite Stratigraphy
