= Triple junction =

Meeting point of three tectonic plates

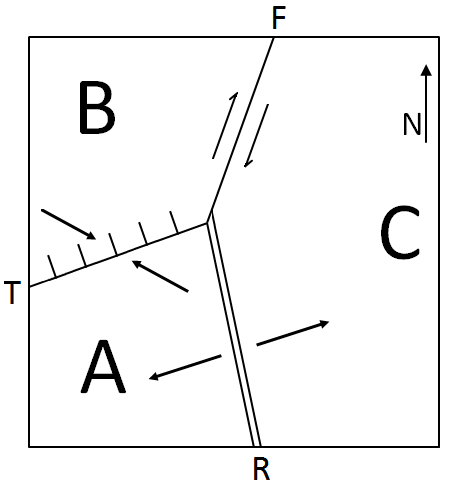
Simplified map of a ridge (R)–trench (T)–transform fault (F) triple junction of tectonic plates A, B, and C, with arrows indicating direction of plate movement

A triple junction is the point where the boundaries of three tectonic plates meet. At the triple junction each of the three boundaries will be one of three types—a ridge (R), trench (T), or transform fault (F)—and triple junctions can be described according to the types of plate margin that meet at them (e.g., fault–fault–trench, ridge–ridge–ridge, or abbreviated F-F-T, R-R-R). Of the ten possible types of triple junctions, only a few are stable through time (stable in this context means that the geometrical configuration of the triple junction will not change through geologic time). The meeting of four or more plates is also theoretically possible, but junctions will only exist instantaneously.

== History ==
The first scientific paper detailing the triple-junction concept was published in 1969 by Dan McKenzie and W. Jason Morgan. The term had traditionally been used for the intersection of three divergent boundaries or spreading ridges. These three divergent boundaries ideally meet at near 120° angles.

In plate tectonics theory during the breakup of a continent, three divergent boundaries form, radiating out from a central point (the triple junction). One of these divergent plate boundaries fails (see aulacogen) and the other two continue spreading to form an ocean. The opening of the south Atlantic Ocean started at the south of the South American and African continents, reaching a triple junction in the present Gulf of Guinea, from where it continued to the west. The NE-trending Benue Trough is the failed arm of this junction.

In the years since, the term "triple junction" has come to refer to any point where three tectonic plates meet.

== Interpretation ==
The properties of triple junctions are most easily understood from the purely kinematic point of view where the plates are rigid and moving over the surface of the Earth. No knowledge of the Earth's interior or the geological details of the crust is then needed. Another useful simplification is that the kinematics of triple junctions on a flat Earth are essentially the same as those on the surface of a sphere. On a sphere, plate motions are described as relative rotations about Euler poles (see Plate reconstruction), and the relative motion at every point along a plate boundary can be calculated from this rotation. But the area around a triple junction is small enough (relative to the size of the sphere) and (usually) far enough from the pole of rotation, that the relative motion across a boundary can be assumed to be constant along that boundary. Thus, analysis of triple junctions can usually be done on a flat surface with motions defined by vectors.

== Stability ==
Main tectonic plate boundaries – ridge (red), trench (green), transform fault (black) – and corresponding triple junctions (yellow dots)

Triple junctions may be described and their stability assessed without use of the geological details but simply by defining the properties of the ridges, trenches and transform faults involved, making some simplifying assumptions and applying simple velocity calculations. This assessment can generalise to most actual triple junction settings provided the assumptions and definitions broadly apply to the real Earth.

A stable junction is one at which the geometry of the junction is retained with time as the plates involved move. This places restrictions on relative velocities and plate boundary orientation. An unstable triple junction will change with time, either to become another form of triple junction (RRF junctions easily evolve to FFR junctions) or to change geometry or are simply not feasible (as in the case of FFF junctions). The inherent instability of an FFF junction is believed to have caused the formation of the Pacific plate about 190 million years ago.

By assuming that plates are rigid and that the Earth is spherical, Leonhard Euler's theorem of motion on a sphere can be used to reduce the stability assessment to determining boundaries and relative motions of the interacting plates. The rigid assumption holds very well in the case of oceanic crust, and the radius of the Earth at the equator and poles only varies by a factor of roughly one part in 300 so the Earth approximates very well to a sphere.

McKenzie and Morgan first analysed the stability of triple junctions using these assumptions with the additional assumption that the Euler poles describing the motions of the plates were such that they approximated straight-line motion on a flat surface. This simplification applies when the Euler poles are distant from the triple junction concerned. The definitions they used for R, T, and F are as follows:

- R – structures that produce lithosphere symmetrically and perpendicular to the relative velocity of the plates on either side (this does not always apply, for example, in the Gulf of Aden).
- T – structures that consume lithosphere from one side only. The relative velocity vector can be oblique to the plate boundary.
- F – active faults parallel to the slip vector.

=== Stability criteria ===
For a triple junction between the plates A, B and C to exist, the following condition must be satisfied:

_{A}v_{B} + _{B}v_{C} + _{C}v_{A} = 0

where _{A}v_{B} is the relative motion of B with respect to A.

This condition can be represented in velocity space by constructing a velocity triangle ABC where the lengths AB, BC and CA are proportional to the velocities _{A}v_{B}, _{B}v_{C} and _{C}v_{A} respectively.

Further conditions must also be met for the triple junction to exist stably—the plates must move in a way that leaves their individual geometries unchanged. Alternatively the triple junction must move in such a way that it remains on all three of the plate boundaries involved.

McKenzie and Morgan demonstrated that these criteria can be represented on the same velocity space diagrams in the following way. The lines ab, bc and ca join points in velocity space, which will leave the geometry of AB, BC, and CA unchanged. These lines are the same as those that join points in velocity space at which an observer could move at the given velocity and still remain on the plate boundary. When these are drawn onto the diagram containing the velocity triangle, these lines must be able to meet at a single point for the triple junction to exist stably.

These lines necessarily are parallel to the plate boundaries, as to remain on the plate boundaries, the observer must either move along the plate boundary or remain stationary on it.

- For a ridge the line constructed must be the perpendicular bisector of the relative motion vector, as to remain in the middle of the ridge, an observer would have to move at half the relative speeds of the plates on either side but could also move in a perpendicular direction along the plate boundary.
- For a transform fault the line must be parallel to the relative motion vector, as all of the motion is parallel to the boundary direction, and so the line ab must lie along AB for a transform fault separating the plates A and B.
- For an observer to remain on a trench boundary, they must walk along the strike of the trench while remaining on the overriding plate. Therefore, the line constructed will lie parallel to the plate boundary but pass through the point in velocity space occupied by the overriding plate.

The point at which these lines meet, J, gives the overall motion of the triple junction with respect to the Earth.

Using these criteria, it can easily be shown why the FFF triple junction is not stable: the only case in which three lines lying along the sides of a triangle can meet at a point is the trivial case in which the triangle has side lengths zero, corresponding to zero relative motion between the plates. As faults are required to be active for the purpose of this assessment, an FFF junction can never be stable.

== Types ==
McKenzie and Morgan determined that there were 16 types of triple junctions theoretically possible, though several of these are speculative and have not necessarily been seen on Earth. These junctions were classified firstly by the types of plate boundaries meeting—for example, RRR, TTR, RRT, FFT, etc.—and secondly by the relative motion directions of the plates involved. Some configurations such as RRR can only have one set of relative motions whereas TTT junctions may be classified into TTT(a) and TTT(b). These differences in motion direction affect the stability criteria.

McKenzie and Morgan claimed that of these 16 types, 14 were stable, with FFF and RRF configurations unstable; however, York later showed that the RRF configuration could be stable under certain conditions.

=== Ridge–ridge–ridge junctions ===
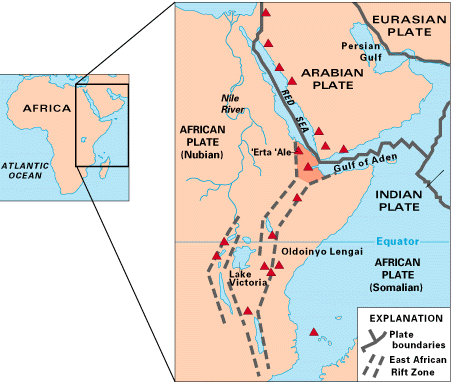
A map of the Afar triangle in East Africa, an example of an RRR junction and the only triple junction on Earth that can be seen above sea level.

An RRR junction is always stable using these definitions and therefore very common on Earth, though in a geological sense ridge spreading is usually discontinued in one direction, leaving a failed rift zone. There are many examples of these present both now and in the geological past, such as the South Atlantic opening with ridges spreading North and South to form the Mid-Atlantic Ridge, and an associated aulacogen, the Benue Trough, in the Niger Delta region of Africa. RRR junctions are also common, as rifting along three fractures at 120° is the best way to relieve stresses from uplift at the surface of a sphere; on Earth, stresses similar to these are believed to be caused by the mantle hotspots thought to initiate rifting in continents.

The stability of RRR junctions is demonstrated below—as the perpendicular bisectors of the sides of a triangle always meet at a single point, the lines AB, BC, and CA can always be made to meet regardless of relative velocities.

=== Ridge–trench–fault junctions ===
RTF junctions are less common, an unstable junction of this type (an RTF(a)) is thought to have existed at roughly 12Ma at the mouth of the Gulf of California where the East Pacific Rise currently meets the San Andreas Fault zone. The Guadeloupe and Farallon microplates were previously being subducted under the North American plate and the northern end of this boundary met the San Andreas Fault. Material for this subduction was provided by a ridge equivalent to the modern East Pacific Rise slightly displaced to the west of the trench. As the ridge itself was subducted an RTF triple junction momentarily existed, but subduction of the ridge caused the subducted lithosphere to weaken and 'tear' from the point of the triple junction. The loss of slab pull caused by the detachment of this lithosphere ended the RTF junction giving the present day ridge – fault system. An RTF(a) is stable if ab goes through the point in velocity space C, or if ac and bc are colinear.

=== Trench–trench–trench junctions ===
A TTT(a) junction can be found in central Japan where the Eurasian plate overrides the Philippine and Pacific plates, with the Philippine plate also overriding the Pacific. Here the Japan Trench effectively branches to form the Ryukyu and Bonin arcs. The stability criteria for this type of junction are either ab and ac form a straight line or that the line bc is parallel to CA.

== Examples ==
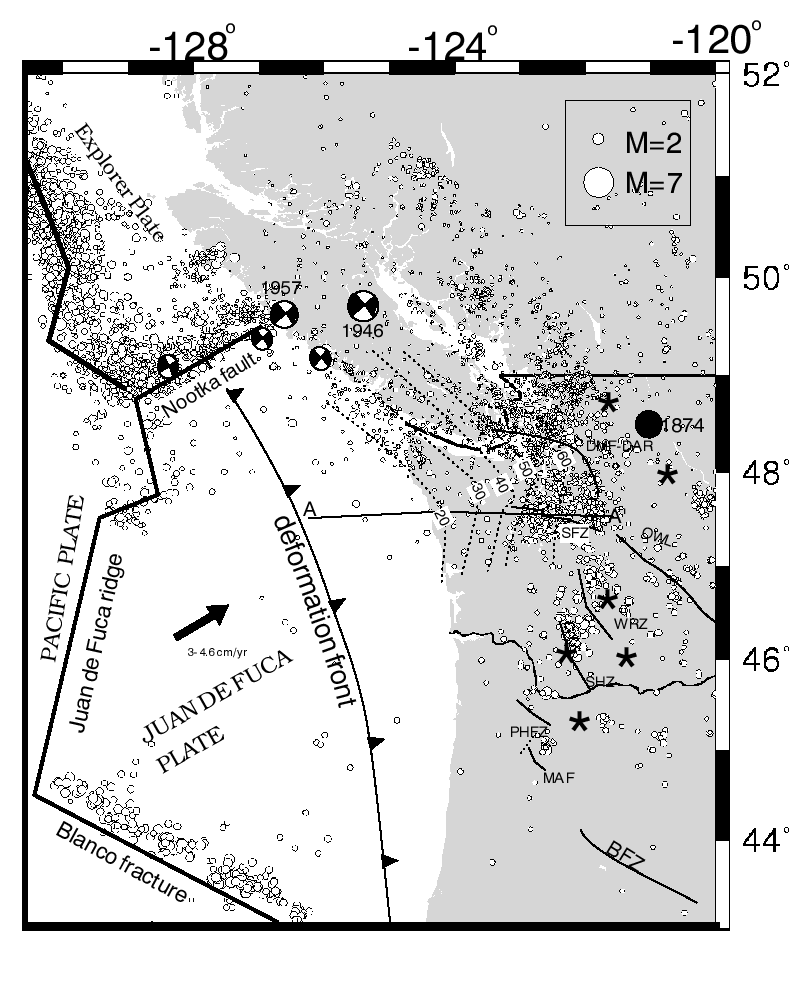
The Nootka Fault at the triple junction of the North American plate, the Explorer plate, and the Juan de Fuca plate

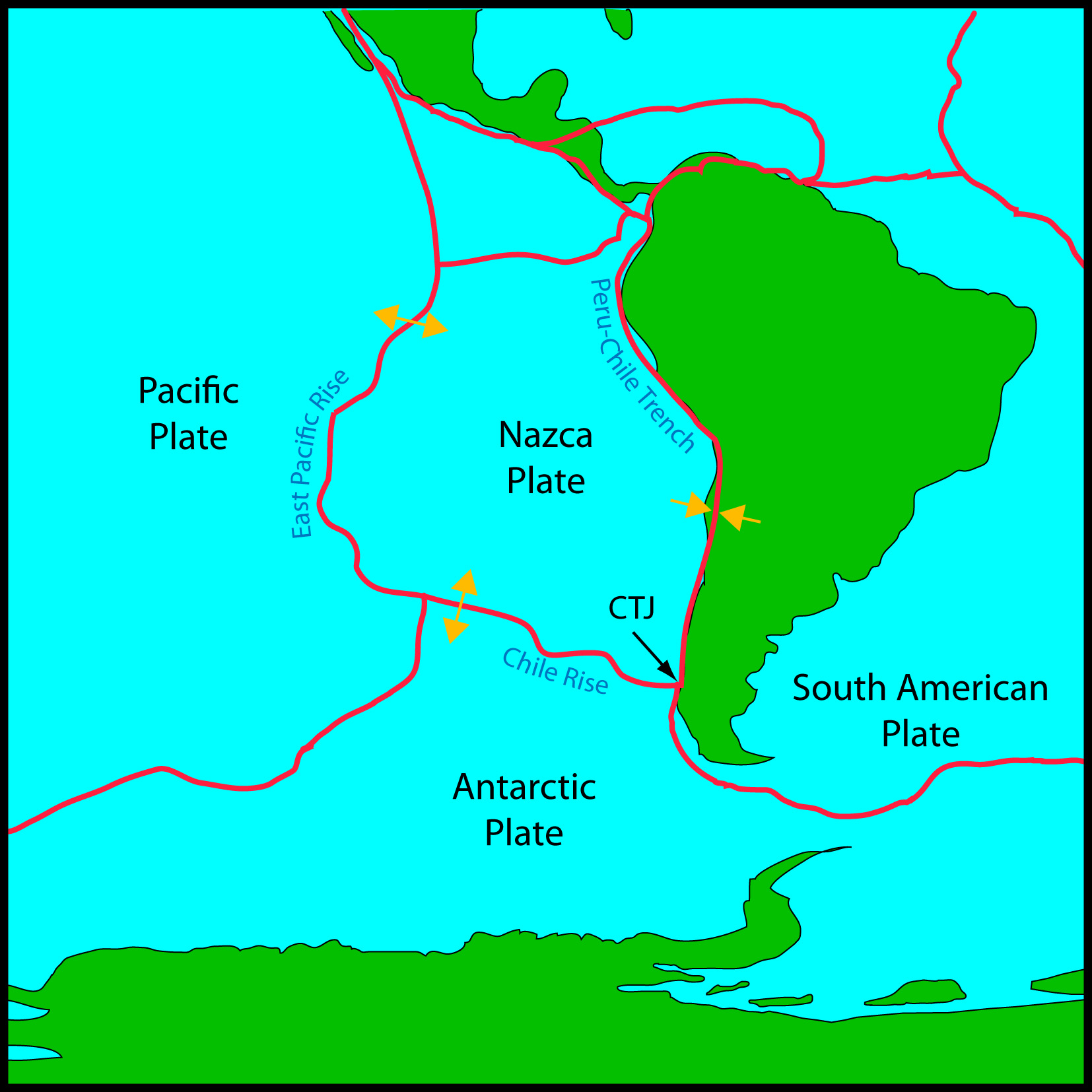
Chile triple junction (CTJ)

- The junction of the Red Sea, the Gulf of Aden and the East African Rift centered in the Afar Triangle (the Afar triple junction) is the only R-R-R triple junction above sea level.
- The Rodrigues triple junction is a R-R-R triple junction in the southern Indian Ocean, where the African, the Indo-Australian and the Antarctic Plates meet.
- The Galapagos triple junction is an R-R-R triple junction where the Nazca, the Cocos, and the Pacific plates meet. The East Pacific Rise extends north and south from this junction and the Cocos–Nazca spreading centre goes to the east. This example is made more complex by the Galapagos Microplate which is a small separate plate on the rise just to the southeast of the triple junction.
- Chiapas coast off Tapachula where Guatemala, North America and Pacific join and small earthquakes occur weekly. This is pushed eastward by the Cocos plate.
- On the west coast of North America is another unstable triple junction offshore of Cape Mendocino. To the south, the San Andreas Fault, a strike-slip fault and transform plate boundary, separates the Pacific plate and the North American plate. To the north lies the Cascadia subduction zone, where a section of the Juan de Fuca plate called the Gorda plate is being subducted under the North American plate, forming a trench (T). Another transform fault, the Mendocino Fault (F), runs along the boundary between the Pacific plate and the Gorda plate. Where the three intersect is the seismically active, F-F-T Mendocino triple junction.
- The Amurian plate, the Okhotsk microplate, and the Philippine Sea plate meet in Japan near Mount Fuji. (see Mount Fuji's Geology)
- The Azores triple junction is a geologic triple junction where the boundaries of three tectonic plates intersect: the North American plate, the Eurasian plate and the African plate, R-R-R.
- The Boso triple junction offshore of Japan is a T-T-T triple junction between the Okhotsk microplate, Pacific plate and Philippine Sea plate.
- The North Sea is located at the extinct triple junction of three former continental plates of the Palaeozoic era: Avalonia, Laurentia and Baltica.
- The South Greenland triple junction was an R-R-R triple junction where the Eurasian, Greenland and North American plates diverged during the Paleogene.
- The Chile triple junction is where the South American plate, the Nazca plate, and the Antarctic plate meet.

== See also ==
- Seafloor spreading – Geological process at mid-ocean ridges
