= Astoria Fan =

Submarine fan radiating asymmetrically southward from the mouth of the Astoria Canyon

Coordinates: 45°15′00″N 126°15′00″W

The Astoria Fan is a submarine fan. It has sediment, radiating asymmetrically southward from the mouth of the Astoria Canyon.

== Shape ==
From Astoria Canyon's mouth, the fan extends about 100 kilometres (62 mi) to its western end, which is the Cascadia Channel. The fan proper ends 160 kilometres (99 mi) south of the canyon mouth, although its depositional basin extends southward another 150 kilometres (93 mi) to the Blanco fracture zone.

Astoria Fan is generally asymmetrical. It extends roughly 55 miles (89 km) west of the mouth of Astoria Canyon, and about 55 miles (89 km) north, to Willapa Channel. Others trace different dimensions.

Headed west, the fan crosses the continental shelf, trending sinuously down to the base of the continental slope. Near Astoria Canyon, it is at a depth of 2,740 metres (8,990 ft). The fan is approximately 75 miles (121 km) long. It varies in width from 1.5 miles (2.4 km) to 8.3 miles (13.4 km). It has numerous tributaries. The fan extends about 100 kilometres (62 mi) to its western boundary, which is the Cascadia Channel.

== Notes on the creation of the Astoria Fan ==
Ash from the eruption of Mount Mazama has been found, in Astoria Fan. It may have been cut in the Pleistocene. It appears the Missoula Floods helped carve the fan.

Astoria Fan merges into Astoria Canyon, 9 miles (14 km) west of the Columbia River mouth. In the past, buried Pleistocene channels appear to have connected the two.

== Nearby submarine canyons ==
All of the following submarine canyons are near, headed north to south:

- Clayoquot Canyon
- Father Charles Canyon
- Loudon Canyon
- Barkely Canyon
- Nitinat Canyon
- Juan de Fuca Canyon
- Quileute Canyon
- Quinault Canyon
- Grays Canyon
- Guide Canyon
- Willapa Canyon
- Astoria Canyon

== See also ==
- Astoria Canyon

=== Local geography ===
- Abyssal fan
- Astoria Canyon
- Astoria Fan
- Cascadia Basin
- Cascadia Channel
- Cascadia subduction zone
- Grays Canyon
- Juan de Fuca Canyon
- Juan de Fuca plate
- Juan de Fuca Channel
- Nitinat Canyon
- Nitinat Fan
- Quinault Canyon
- Quileute Canyon
- Willapa Canyon

== External links and references ==
- A map
- A scientific article
- Article, from Oregon State University
- Springer-Verlag article
- A NOAA article
- A doctoral thesis on Astoria Fan
- Some geographic information
- One youtube
