= Gorda Ridge =

Tectonic spreading center off the northern coast of California and southern Oregon

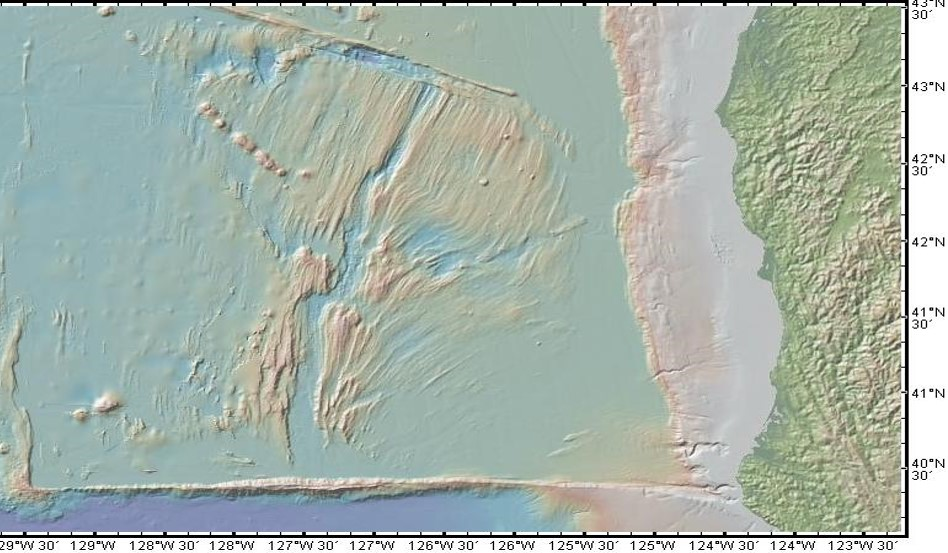
Bathymetric image of the Gorda Ridge – GeoMapApp

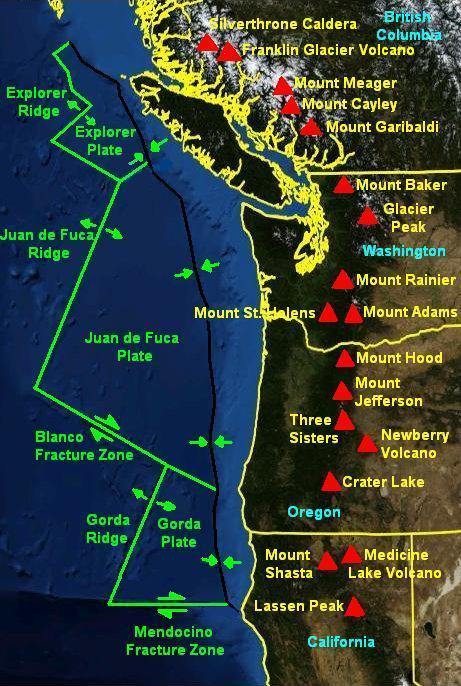
The regional setting of the Gorda Ridge

The Gorda Ridge (or plural, Ridges) (centered 41° 36' N, 127° 22' W), is a tectonic spreading center, located roughly 200 kilometres (120 mi) off the northern coast of California and southern Oregon. Running northeast to southwest, the region is roughly 300 kilometres (190 mi) in length. The ridge is broken into three segments: the northern ridge, central ridge, and the southern ridge, which includes the Escanaba Trough.

== Regional setting ==
The Gorda Ridge runs in a north-easterly direction, bounded at both ends by transform faults. At the southern end, the ridge meets the Mendocino transform fault, while the northern end butts against the Blanco transform fault. To the east is the Gorda plate, which together with the Juan de Fuca plate to its north, are part of the once-vast Farallon plate. These two oceanic plates are currently moving east, subducting underneath the North American plate in what is known as the Cascadia subduction zone. To the west and south of the ridge is the Pacific plate, which is currently moving west, and diverging from the Gorda plate. The Gorda Ridge was formed through the divergence of the Pacific and Gorda plates. Eight underwater volcanoes, known as the President Jackson Seamounts, sit on the Pacific plate, roughly 50 km west of the northern portion of the ridge.

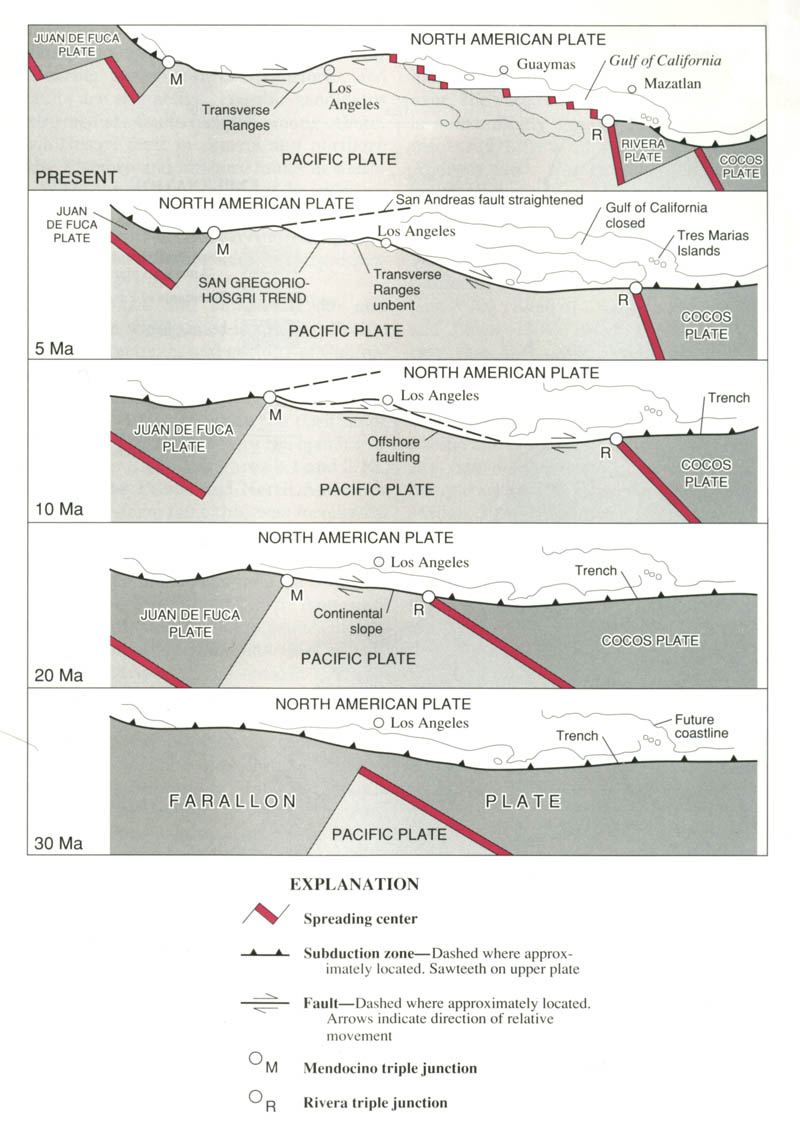
The history of the Gorda Ridge formation

== Geological history ==
About thirty million years ago, the Farallon plate began subducting beneath the North American plate, segmenting the Pacific Farallon Ridge. This subduction created new microplates and new ridges, including the Juan de Fuca plate and Juan de Fuca Ridge. As the Juan de Fuca plate continued to subduct underneath the North American plate, it also segmented, creating the Gorda plate and Gorda Ridge.

== Spreading rate ==
The Pacific plate is moving in a northwest direction, creating a divergence with the Gorda plate at a speed of 5 cm per year. The Juan de Fuca and Gorda plates are moving east-northeast, subducting under the North American plate at a much slower rate of 2.5 to 3 cm per year. Because the ridge is divided into three distinct parts, each section has its own spreading rate, caused by the slab-pull and ridge-push of the surrounding tectonic plates. The northern segment is the narrowest, with portions as narrow as 3 km across, and has the fastest spreading rate of 2.9 cm per year (half-rate). The central segment is roughly 10 km wide with a spreading rate of 2.4 cm per year (half-rate). The southern segment has sections as wide as 18 km, and has the slowest spreading rate of 1.2 cm per year (half-rate).

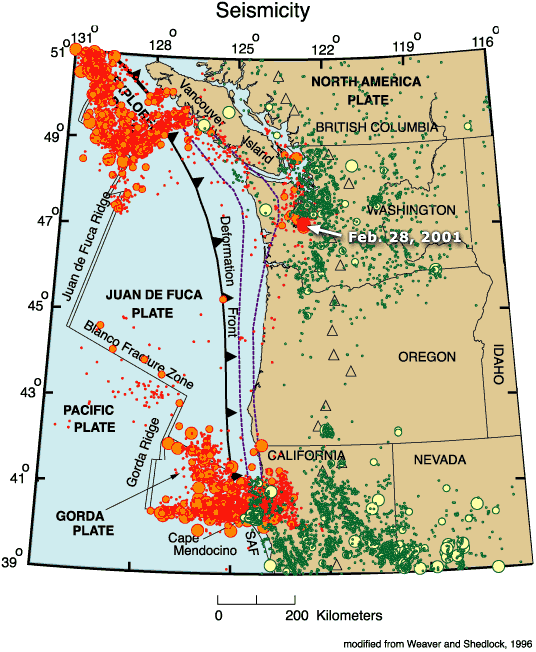
Seismic events near the Gorda Ridge

== Seismicity ==
Due to the Gorda Ridge's proximity to the Mendocino triple junction, the area experiences a significant amount of seismic activity. The majority of activity is seen on the Gorda plate, however some occurs on the ridge itself. Most events are generated by the divergence of the Pacific plate and the Gorda plate. Since 1983, there have been approximately eighty magnitude-3 earthquakes at this location each year.

== 1996 eruption ==
On February 28, 1996, the northern segment of the Gorda Ridge experienced a burst of seismic activity, lasting roughly three weeks. Concurrent with seismicity were a series of slow volcanic eruptions (1 to 10 m^{3}/sec), forming thick flows of pillow basalt. These pillow basalts are thickest to the north, indicating that this region's activity lasted longer than that in other portions of the ridge. The estimated volume of magma erupted during this event is 18 million m^{3}, forming a blanket of new oceanic crust, averaging 75 m thick.

== Axial valley ==
Unlike most intermediate spreading centers, the Gorda Ridge has a large rift valley, which is typically seen in areas of slow spreading centers. This is caused by the oceanic crust beneath the ridge being thinner, and mantle temperatures being cooler than other intermediate spreading centers. The Gorda Ridge has an average depth of 3000 m, with a few locations reaching depths of 3500 m. The walls of this valley are steep, in most cases giving a vertical relief of over 1000 m. The floor of the southern ridge valley has been filled in with roughly 1000 m of sediment from the continental margin, mostly delivered by turbidity currents. The central ridge valley contains exposed basalt, and the northern ridge valley has a light covering of sediment.

== See also ==
- Divergent boundary
- Explorer Ridge
- Juan de Fuca Ridge
