= Indus Fan =

Depositional feature of the Indus river

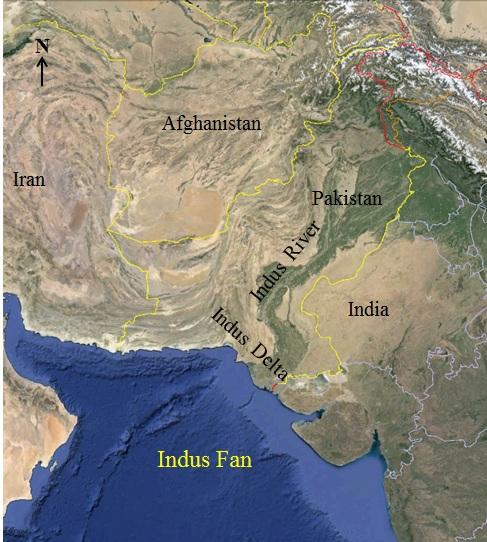
Geological Map of the Indus Fan

The Indus Fan is an abyssal fan system in the northern Arabian Sea, created by the discharge of sediment from the simultaneous accretion and erosion of the Indus River Delta coastline, alongside significant turbidity at the river's various exit channels along the southern Sindhi coastline of Pakistan. It is one of the most significant depositional feature of the offshore Arabian Basin. It is the second largest fan system, and abyssal fan system in the world after the Bengal Fan between India, Bangladesh and the Andaman Islands. The Indus fan was deposited in an unconfined setting on the continental slope, rise and basin floor, covering a significant portion of the northern Arabian Sea. The entire fan extends over an area of 110,000 square kilometers with greater than 9 km of sediment accumulating near the top-of-slope.

== History ==
The Indus Basin was created through the erosion of Karakoram and the Western Himalayas. Fan sedimentation is estimated to have begun at the end of the Oligocene or beginning of the Miocene, during a period of faster Himalayan exhumation, possibly linked to Monsoon intensification. The fan rapidly gained sediment during the middle Miocene. The upper Indus Fan, both ancient and recent, contains one of the world's largest channel-levee systems (CLS). These systems act as conduits for sediments from the interior to deeper parts of the basin. Coarser grained sediments are deposited in the channel belts, whereas finer grained silts and clays are deposited along the levees. This arrangement of sediments is ideal for stratigraphic plays and is why these channel-levee systems are important to the petroleum industry.

Prior to widespread disruptive human activity, the Indus delivered to the Arabian Sea the fifth largest sediment load of any river on the planet, drawing primarily from the "barren, unconsolidated glacial and fluvially reworked detritus ... eroded from high-relief, rapidly uplifting tectonic units of the western Tibetan Plateau, Karakoram and the Indus Suture Zone". Human actions, though, have significantly disrupted natural sedimentation of the Indus Delta and Indus Fan, creating an imbalance between the river's sediment deposits and the already intense erosion characteristic of the region's shelf and coastline. This has led to an 80% reduction in sedimentation in obstructed regions of the Delta clinoform since 1950, in turn leading to significant erosion of the delta front clinoform and coastline in exploited regions of the Delta, reaching upwards of ~ 50 metres (160 ft) in some areas. This has occurred in line with a continuance or, in some cases, strengthening of sedimentation rates in the Delta's unobstructed channels, primarily those on the far edges of the delta lacking significant obstruction from human infrastructure.

== Hydrography ==
The Indus Fan, a sedimentation cluster created by the depositional flow of the Indus River, is the second largest fan system in the world. It spreads out from its core layer at the mouth of the Indus Canyon, a thin, steep sloped extension of the river carved into the seabed up to the Sindhi continental shelf line. The Canyon primarily formed prior to the Last Glacial Maximum (LGM), though it is believed to have been initially formed during the Last Interglacial, when sea levels were relatively high, and turbidity significant in the region at the mouth of the Indus up to the edge of the continental shelf at 135 metres (443 ft) below sea level.

During the LGM, the shelf sat above sea level and the river thus extended approximately 130 kilometres (81 mi) further before emptying into the Arabian Sea. What would become the Indus Canyon experienced "maximum erosion and funneled turbidity currents to the aggradational channel-levee system on the Indus Fan" during this period, meaning that the shelf line was intensively carved out along the riverbank's exit channels. Highly pressurized, directionally uniform, and sediment-filled discharge exiting at the mouth of the river which produced the pronounced canyon, and the swept out remains of the shelf line that once filled it thereafter built up at the border between the continental slope and basin floor along the edges of the submarine mouth of the river system. As the shelf flooded at the beginning of the Holocene, delta front sediments rose and resettled along the "innermost shelf", producing the pronounced underwater canyon and enclosing sedimentary ridge seen today.

The Fan stretches out ~ 800 kilometres (500 mi) past the mouth of the Indus Canyon, reaching its furthest extent roughly at the Arabian Sea's center. Though sedimentation levels are high, annual water discharge from the river is relatively low, primarily a result of aridity in the region. Sedimentation is pushed back by the tidal forces witnessed to the west of the Gulf of Khambat on the fan's eastern flank, and blocked by the natural geographic barriers built by De Covilhao Trench / Owen fracture zone to the west. As a result, disturbed debris principally traveled southwestwards, settling out over millennia according to the flow rate and meander of the Delta's exit channels.
