= Kenji Satake =

Japanese seismologist (born 1958)

- Education: Hokkaido University; University of Tokyo
- Scientific career
- Fields: Seismology
- Workplaces: University of Tokyo

Kenji Satake is a Japanese seismologist who has made significant contributions to subduction and tsunami research. Along with Brian Atwater and David Yamaguchi, Satake assembled disparate pieces of information regarding a Japanese tsunami that had no known origin – an orphan tsunami. The three scientists worked together to pinpoint a date, time, and location for the 1700 Cascadia earthquake – 9 p.m. on January 26, 1700 – on the Cascadia subduction zone off the Pacific Northwest coast of North America.

== Awards ==
- 2005 National Medal with Purple Ribbon
