= Gorda plate =

One of the northern remnants of the Farallon plate

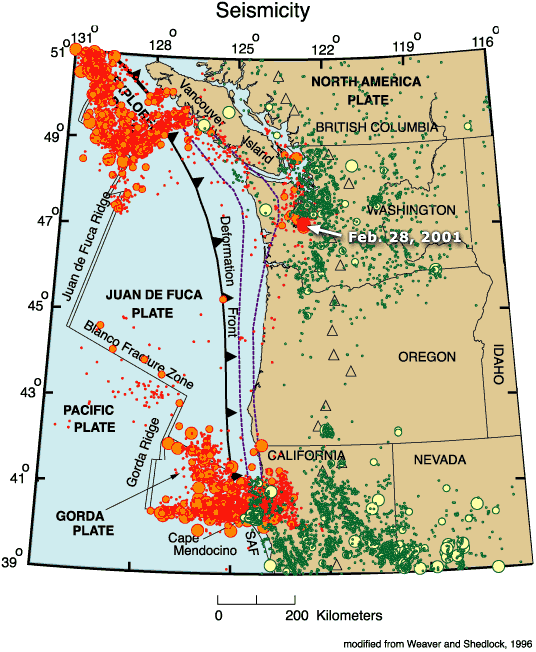
A map of the Gorda and neighboring Juan de Fuca plates subducting under the North American plate; earthquake epicenters are shown in orange

The Gorda plate, located beneath the Pacific Ocean off the coast of northern California, is one of the northern remnants of the Farallon plate. It is sometimes referred to (by, for example, publications from the USGS Earthquake Hazards Program) as simply the southernmost portion of the neighboring Juan de Fuca plate, another Farallon remnant.

Unlike most tectonic plates, the Gorda plate experiences significant intraplate deformation inside its boundaries. Numerous faults have been mapped in both the sediments and basement of the Gorda Basin, which is in the interior of the plate south of 41.6°N. Stresses from the neighboring North American plate and Pacific plate cause frequent earthquakes in the interior of the plate, including the 1980 Eureka earthquake (also known as the Gorda Basin event).

The easterly side is the Cascadia subduction zone where the plate subducts under the North American plate in northern California. The southerly side is a transform boundary with the Pacific plate along the Mendocino Fault. The westerly side is a divergent boundary with the Pacific plate forming the Gorda Ridge. This ridge provides morphological evidence of differing spreading rates, with the northern portion of the ridge being narrow, and the southern portion being wide. The northerly side is a transform boundary with the Juan de Fuca plate, the Blanco fracture zone.

The subducting Gorda plate is connected with the volcanoes in northern California, namely, Mount Shasta and Lassen Peak. Lassen Peak last erupted in 1914–1917.

== See also ==
- Blanco fracture zone
- Cascadia subduction zone
- Mendocino triple junction
