= Interplate earthquake =

Earthquake that occurs at the boundary between two tectonic plates

An interplate earthquake occurs at the boundary between two tectonic plates. Earthquakes of this type account for more than 90 percent of the total seismic energy released around the world. If one plate is trying to move past the other, they will be locked until sufficient stress builds up to cause the plates to slip relative to each other. The slipping process creates an earthquake with relative displacement on either side of the fault, resulting in seismic waves which travel through the Earth and along the Earth's surface. Relative plate motion can be lateral as along a transform fault boundary, vertical if along a convergent boundary (i.e. subduction or thrust/reverse faulting) or a divergent boundary (i.e. rift zone or normal faulting), and oblique, with horizontal and lateral components at the boundary. Interplate earthquakes associated at a subduction boundary are called megathrust earthquakes, which include most of the Earth's largest earthquakes.

Intraplate earthquakes are often confused with interplate earthquakes, but are fundamentally different in origin, occurring within a single plate rather than between two tectonic plates on a plate boundary. The specifics of the mechanics by which they occur, as well as the intensity of the stress drop which occurs after the earthquake also differentiate the two types of events. Intraplate earthquakes have, on average, a higher stress drop than that of an interplate earthquake and generally higher intensity.

== Mechanics ==
Mechanically, interplate earthquakes differ from other seismic events in that they are caused by motion at the boundary between two tectonic plates. An interplate earthquake event occurs when the accumulated stress at a tectonic plate boundary are released via brittle failure and displacement along the fault.

There are three types of plate boundaries to consider in the context of interplate earthquake events:

- Transform fault: Where two boundaries slide laterally relative to each other.
- Divergent boundary: Where two boundaries move apart.
- Convergent boundary: Where one plate moves towards, and potentially subducts beneath, another plate.

=== Precursory tremors ===
Scientists have determined that interplate earthquakes are sometimes preceded by an irregular occurrence of small tremors. Precursory tremors are often associated with slow slip along a plate boundary. These precursory tremors can sometimes be identified within days or weeks of an interplate earthquake event and allow researchers to anticipate interplate earthquakes and introduce strategies to mitigate damage.

== Differences with intraplate earthquakes ==
Beyond the inherent mechanical differences leading to interplate earthquake events and location of interplate earthquakes on plate boundaries, these seismic occurrences can be differentiated by other means.

=== Intensity ===
Interplate earthquakes differ from intraplate earthquakes in that the intensity of intraplate earthquakes exceed those of interplate earthquakes by nearly two points. Using the Modified Mercalli Intensity scale, earthquakes are categorized descriptively on a scale from I (not felt) to XII (total destruction) based on observed effects of the seismic event. While the ground accelerations of these two types of events are similar, the resulting intensity of intraplate earthquakes is significantly greater than that of interplate earthquakes due to the greater energy release (stress drop) across intraplate faults.

==== Stress drop ====
Stress drop is a measure of the stress across a fault before and after an earthquake rupture. While intraplate and interplate earthquakes obey similar length proportional scaling laws, interplate earthquakes exhibit stress drop values that are systematically smaller by a factor of 6. This suggests that the boundaries between plates are significantly weaker than the plates themselves. The reason for the measurable, systemic difference in stress drop between interplate and intraplate earthquakes is not entirely understood. However, intraplate earthquake models show that stress is distributed uniformly across the fault whereas interplate earthquakes have stress concentrated in specific areas along the boundary. Furthermore, interplate earthquakes release stress immediately, as compared to intraplate earthquakes which release stress gradually.

== Effects ==
=== Subduction erosion ===
Basal erosion, the process of removal of materials from the underside of the upper plate by the subducting plate, occurs at numerous, but not all, convergent margins. As the process of subduction erosion is not completely understood, a model has been proposed in which basal erosion is supplemented by cyclical, interplate earthquakes. The model suggests that erosion does not occur gradually in subduction zones, but rather in brief episodes of elevated seismicity along the plate boundary.

==== Tsunamis ====
Earthquakes are a major factor in the creation of tsunami waves. As interplate earthquakes result in an immediate release of stress along a fault, they produce significant seismic energy and can cause seafloor uplift, generating large waves as the energy from the sudden slip along the fault is transferred to the overlying water body. However, the majority of interplate earthquakes are not intense enough to create tidal waves, with most tsunamis being caused by intraplate earthquakes or tsunami earthquakes due to their comparatively slow stress release regimes and proximity to the surface of the Earth.

== Major interplate earthquakes ==
Interplate earthquakes account for over 90% of all seismic energy released worldwide. As such, their effects are widespread and interplate earthquake events are numerous. Earthquakes of magnitudes higher than 5 in populated regions are considered highly dangerous and pose a direct threat to human life and property. Some of the largest, most devastating earthquakes that have occurred in the last century have been identified as interplate events. Some areas of the world that are particularly prone to interplate earthquakes due to the presence of prominent plate boundaries include the west coast of North America (especially California and Alaska), the northeastern Mediterranean region (Greece, Italy, and Turkey in particular), Iran, New Zealand, Indonesia, India, Japan, and parts of China.

Major earthquakes (magnitude ≥ 9.0) since 1900
Date	Latitude	Longitude	Depth (km)	Magnitude	Location
2011-03-11	38.297	142.373	29	9.1	near the east coast of Honshu, Japan
2004-12-26	3.295	95.982	30	9.1	off the west coast of northern Sumatra
1964-03-28	60.908	−147.339	25	9.2	Southern Alaska
1960-05-22	−38.143	−73.407	25	9.5	Bio-Bio, Chile
1952-11-04	52.623	59.779	21.6	9	off the east coast of the Kamchatka Peninsula, Russia

Major earthquakes (magnitude ≥ 9.0) since 1900

== See also ==
- Forearc
