= Blanco fracture zone =

Geological fault zone off the Oregon coast in the US

The Blanco fracture zone between the Gorda Ridge and the Juan de Fuca Ridge

The Blanco fracture zone or Blanco transform fault zone (BTFZ) is a right lateral transform fault zone, which runs northwest off the coast of Oregon in the Pacific Northwest of the United States, extending from the Gorda Ridge in the south to the Juan de Fuca Ridge in the north.

== Morphology ==
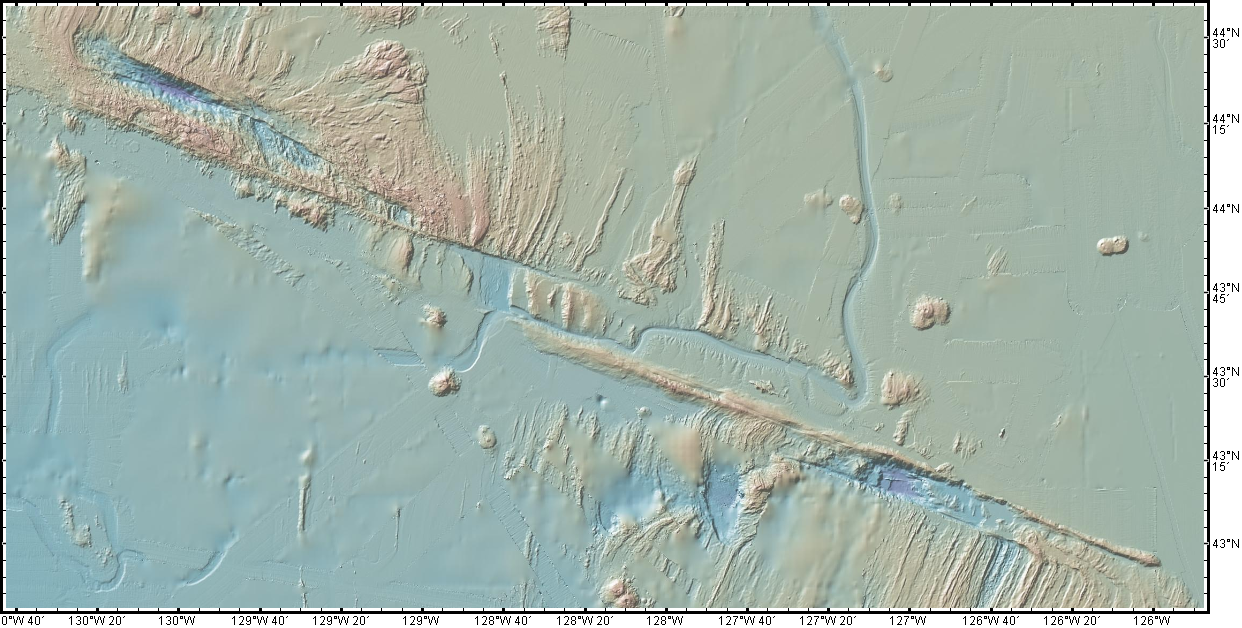
Blanco fracture zone

The Blanco transform fault zone is an approximately 350 km long zone that varies in width between 20 and 75 km. The Blanco fracture zone starts about 150 km off Cape Blanco, and extends northwest to about 500 km off of Newport. It consists of a series of deep basins interrupted by transform faults. The western part of the fracture zone, from the Cascadia Depression to the Juan de Fuca Ridge, moves at 1.4 cm/a; the eastern segment, from the Cascadia Depression to the Gorda Ridge moves at 3.9 cm/a. The whole zone averages a slip rate of 2.0 cm/a.

Through it, Cascadia Channel passes.

=== Eastern segment ===
The principal feature of the eastern portion of the zone is the Blanco Ridge, a 150 km right lateral-moving fault that is responsible for the largest earthquakes in the region. The ridge itself varies between 3.5 and 7 km wide, and peaks between 600 and 1000 m above the seafloor. The ridge likely formed through extensive shearing and subsequent serpentinization from the intrusion of seawater.

The Gorda Depression, a 10 km wide extensional basin, connects the eastern end of the Blanco Ridge to the Gorda Ridge. This basin is around 4400 m deep in the center, 11 km across in the NE-SW direction, and 18 km wide in the NW-SE direction.

=== Center ===
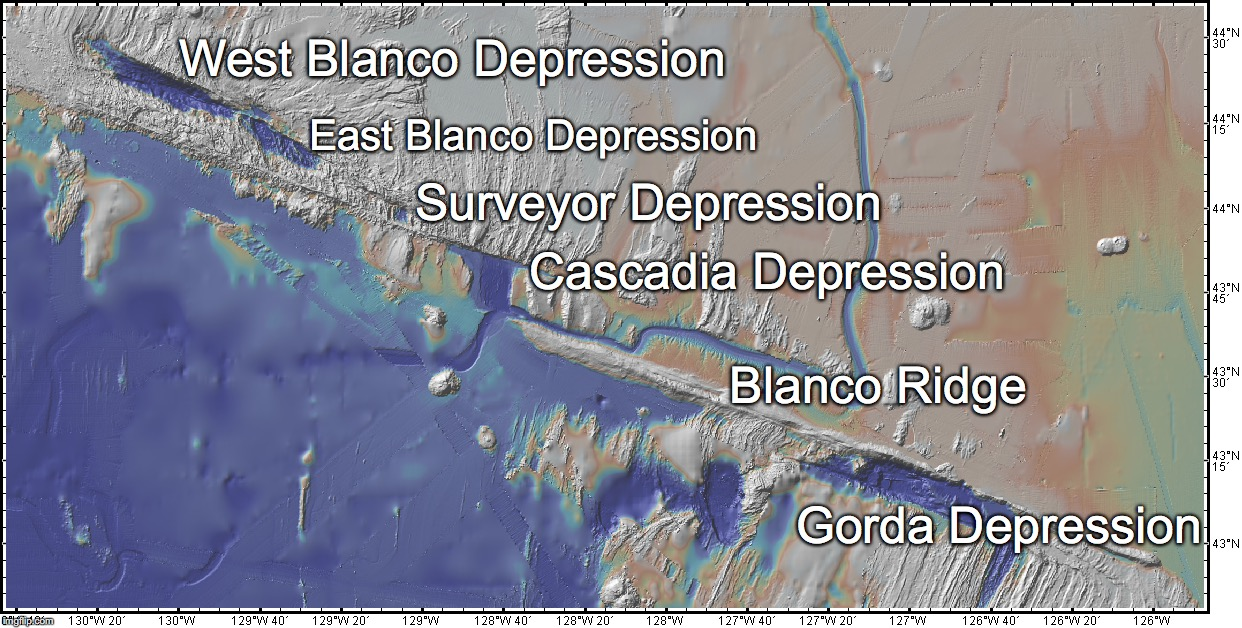

The Cascadia Depression connects the two halves of the Blanco transform fault zone. The depression is elongated, around 20 km in the NE-SW direction, but only about 8 km in the NW-SE direction. Roughly 500 m of sediments line the floor of the depression, mostly turbidites. Channels cut through the southern end of the depression are remnants of turbidity flows originating from the Missoula floods, but there are also signs of more recent, local turbidity currents.

There is also evidence of active seafloor spreading in this zone, indicating that the Cascadia Depression likely became separated from one of the spreading ridges that border the Blanco transform fault zone.

=== Western segment ===
The western part of the zone is made up of a series of depressions separated by transform fault ridges. The Surveyor Depression is the shallowest and smallest of these depressions, reaching a maximum depth of 3300 m and only measuring at 5 km across. It is connected through the Parks Plateau fault to the Cascadia Depression.

A small sill connects the Surveyor Depression to the East Blanco Depression, a broad basin which is composed of a series of small deeps ranging from 3600 m to 3700m. Small intermediate ridges rise up a few hundred meters to separate these local ravines.

A larger sill rises up to 2900 m depth to separate the East Blanco Depression from the final major depression, the West Blanco Depression. The West Blanco Depression is shallow in the south, reaching only a depth of 3400 m, but quickly reaches depth near the Juan de Fuca Ridge, dropping down to 4800 m. This basin is at a slightly different angle than the other western depressions, likely due to interference from the Juan de Fuca Ridge.

All of these depressions are likely pull-apart basins, the result of extensional stresses from the two nearby spreading centers.

== Earthquakes ==
=== General ===
Most large events in this zone occur on the Blanco Ridge, as the motion on this fault accounts for the majority of the plate movement. Strike slip faulting occurs in this region; motion on the fault is parallel to the motion of the plate.

Tectonic activity in the central part of the zone is weaker and deeper than on the Blanco Ridge. Typically this activity is consistent with normal faulting, although interference with the Cascadia Depression spreading center changes the motion on some of the faults.

Shallow earthquakes consistent with strike-slip faulting occur on the western side of the zone, but their large distribution indicates that multiple faults exist. Generally these faults run along the walls of the bathymetric basins, but near the Juan de Fuca ridge they become distorted, and rotate towards the ridge axis instead.

=== Swarms ===
On January 9, 1994, a large series or swarm of earthquakes occurred in the East Blanco Depression. Acoustic signals recorded during these events indicated that an eruption occurred in this zone. Further investigation revealed an active hydrothermal vent, the first of its kind to be discovered in a transform fault zone.

In March and April 2008, a swarm of moderate earthquakes occurred both near and within the Blanco zone. The swarm began on March 30 when over 600 measurable tremors began occurring north of the zone within the Juan de Fuca plate. On April 23, activity moved to the Blanco fault zone itself, near its junction with the Gorda Ridge.

Another series of earthquakes occurred in June 2015. Spread out over a period of a few days, some reached magnitudes of 5.8.

In December 2021, a swarm of earthquakes occurred on the northwest portion of the Blanco fracture zone, with multiple being stronger than magnitude 5.

On June 15, 2022, a swarm of nine earthquakes took place, the maximum magnitude being 5.6.

== See also ==
- Astoria Fan
- Geology of the Pacific Northwest
- Mendocino fracture zone
