= Quinault Cultural Center and Museum =

Museum in Washington state

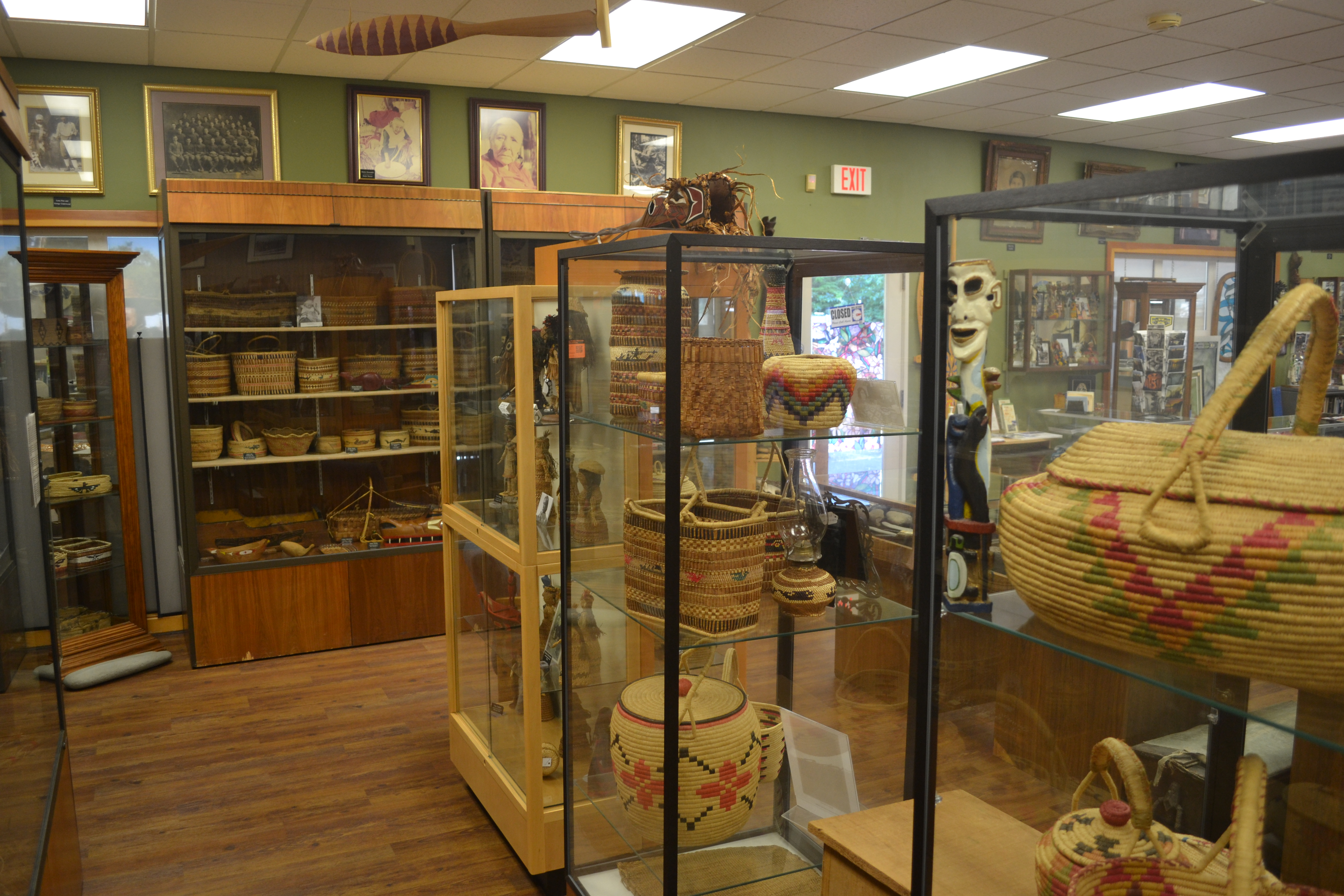

- Location within Washington (state)
- Established: c. 2000
- Location: 807 5th Avenue, Taholah, Washington
- Coordinates: 47.3416°N 124.2882°W
- Type: Cultural
- Collections: Baskets, carvings, tribal library, and photographic archive
- Curator: Lelani Chubby
- Owner: Quinault Indian Nation

The Quinault Cultural Center and Museum is a museum of culture in Taholah, Washington, owned and funded by the Quinault Indian Nation. It contains artifacts, arts, and crafts of the Quinault, housed in a converted retail building. Some of the art forms have been influenced by Polynesian cultural motifs, brought home by World War II veterans.

The museum received a grant from the Institute of Museum and Library Services in 2012 to conduct research, publish a guidebook, and create a mobile museum exhibit on the tribe's ethnobotanical heritage.

In 2013, the Cultural Center hosted workshops on paddle- and drum-making for thousands of visitors to the Tribal Canoe Journeys.
