= Mendocino fracture zone =

Geologic fracture zone and transform boundary near northern California

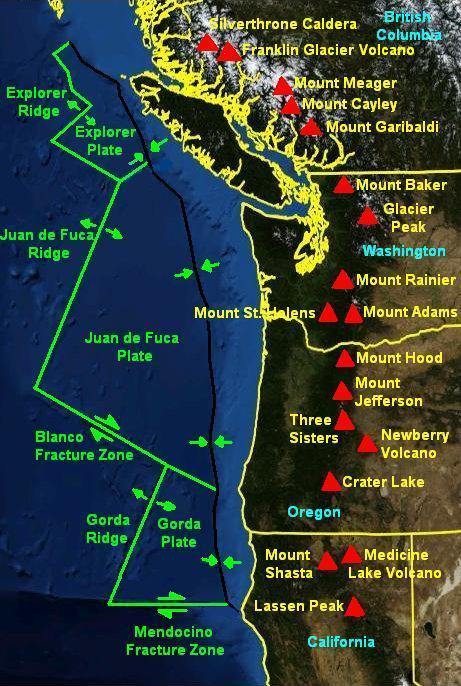
The Mendocino Fracture Zone between the Gorda plate and Pacific plate (only the active section is traced)

The Mendocino fracture zone is a fracture zone and transform boundary over 4000 km (2500 miles) long, starting off the coast of Cape Mendocino in far northern California. It runs westward from a triple junction with the San Andreas Fault and the Cascadia subduction zone for about 300 km to the southern end of the Gorda Ridge. It continues on west of its junction with the Gorda Ridge, as an inactive remnant section which extends for about 4,000 km to approximately 35°N 175°W.

Technically, a fracture zone is not a transform fault, but in the case of the Mendocino, the term has been loosely applied to the active fault segment east of the Gorda Ridge as well as to the true fracture zone segment west of it. Many seismologists refer to the active segment as the Mendocino Fault or Mendocino fault zone. The fault section demarcates the boundary between the northwestward-moving Pacific plate and the eastward-moving Gorda plate. The Gorda plate is subducting beneath the North American plate just offshore of Cape Mendocino. Where the Mendocino Fault intersects the undersea trench of the subduction zone, it also meets the San Andreas Fault. This seismically active intersection is called a triple junction, and specifically the Mendocino triple junction.

In tsunami studies, energy focusing around the fracture zone has been noted, leading to increased wave heights in the area around Crescent City, California. The fracture zone is referred to as the Mendocino escarpment in these studies, descriptively rather than named from its geological origin.

== History ==
Robert W. Pease observed in 1965 that the alignment of a transverse tectonic zone extending from Mount Lassen to the Walker Lane at the north end of Honey Lake Fault, suggests it was once the continental terminus of the Mendocino Fault. It forms the boundary of the Modoc Plateau and Columbia Plateau provinces with the Great Basin. Where it meets Honey Lake Fault, it bends to trend northeast across the northwest corner of Nevada, where it accompanies the geological trough that forms Black Rock Desert.

== See also ==
- Blanco fracture zone
- List of fracture zones
- List of earthquakes in California
