= Mendocino triple junction =

Point where the Gorda plate, the North American plate, and the Pacific plate meet

Coordinates: 40°22′N 124°36′W

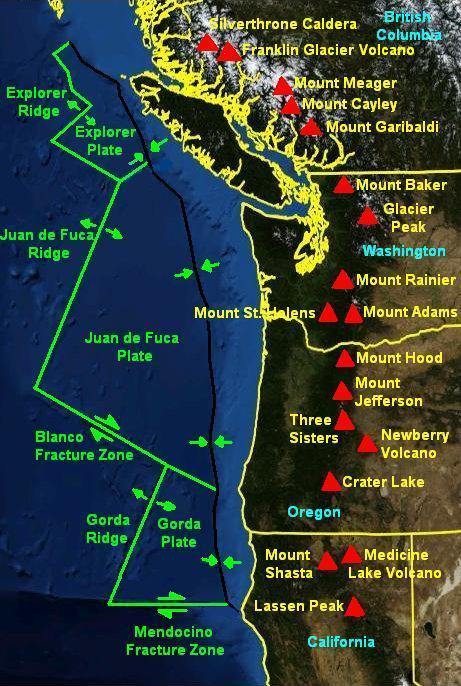
The Mendocino triple junction is located at the eastern end of the Mendocino fracture zone where it approaches Cape Mendocino.

The Mendocino triple junction (MTJ) is the point where the Gorda plate, the North American plate, and the Pacific plate meet, in the Pacific Ocean near Cape Mendocino in northern California. This triple junction is the location of a change in the broad tectonic plate motions which dominate the west coast of North America, linking convergence of the northern Cascadia subduction zone and translation of the southern San Andreas Fault system. This region can be characterized by transform fault movement, the San Andreas also by transform strike slip movement, and the Cascadia subduction zone by a convergent plate boundary subduction movement. The Gorda plate is subducting, towards N50ºE, under the North American plate at 2.5–3 cm/yr, and is simultaneously converging obliquely against the Pacific plate at a rate of 5 cm/yr in the direction N115ºE. The accommodation of this plate configuration results in a transform boundary along the Mendocino fracture zone, and a divergent boundary at the Gorda Ridge. This area is tectonically active historically and today. The Cascadia subduction zone is capable of producing megathrust earthquakes on the order of MW 9.0.

Due to the relative plate motions, the triple junction has been migrating northwards for the past 25–30 million years, and assuming rigid plates, the geometry requires that a void, called slab window, develop southeast of the MTJ. At this point, removal of the subducting Gorda lithosphere from beneath North America causes asthenospheric upwelling. This instigates different tectonic processes, which include surficial uplift, crustal deformation, intense seismic activity, high heat flow, and even the extrusion of volcanic rocks. This activity is centered on the current triple junction position, but evidence for its migration is found in the geology all along the California coast, starting as far south as Los Angeles.

== Slab-window model and triple-junction migration ==
The passage of the MTJ causes mantle material to flow into the region vacated by the Gorda plate. Once this hot mantle material is south of the triple junction, it cools, stiffens, and accretes to the adjacent lithosphere, eventually welding to it and moving along with it, analogous to the motion of a conveyor belt. Lower crust-upper mantle viscous coupling plays a dominant role in converting accretionary margin materials into continent-like crust. Researchers were able to demonstrate that in this 'conveyor belt' mechanism, the crust is first thickened north of the triple junction, and after passage, the crust is thinned south of the triple junction. In this way, as the MTJ migrates, there is production of a basal conveyor belt beneath North America that transports material from the south to the north. This is consistent with an observed pattern of anomalous crustal structure determined by local-earthquake crustal tomography in the region.

== Geolithology ==
The region is dominated by Mesozoic-to-Cretaceous aged rocks which make up an uplifted subduction zone accretionary wedge called the Franciscan Complex. This unit is made of sandstones, shales, cherts, metagraywackes, melanges, as well as mafic volcanics, and is mostly metamorphosed to blueschist and eclogite facies.

== Thermal regime ==
The spatial distribution of heat flow in the vicinity of the MTJ is similar to what would be expected in a subduction environment. That is, heat flow is low above the subducting Gorda slab, between 40 and 50 mW/m^{2}. South of the MTJ, heat flow through the California coast is higher, around 90 mW/m^{2}. The distance south of the MTJ over which heat flow increases gives an indication of the timing of development of the heat flow anomaly. The observed surface heat flow doubles over a distance of ~200 km, corresponding to a timeframe of migration of 4–5 Ma. It is also consistent with a source for the anomaly, thought to be asthenospheric mantle material, emplaced at shallow depths of 15–25 km, i.e. in the slab window. This rise of the heat flow anomaly time implies that there is probably only a thin crustal lid above the slab window.

== Genesis of volcanics ==
The presence of hot asthenospheric mantle at shallow levels beneath the western margin of North America is likely to generate melt and cause magmatism. Accordingly, a sequence of volcanoes in the wake of the MTJ passing were activated; this magmatism likely leads to the intrusion of plutons within the overlying crust in the region.

An example of volcanic bodies that formed by magma upwelling and solidification are the Nine Sisters, located between Morro Bay and San Luis Obispo in California. The source of the material which flows into the slab window is a matter of debate, specifically whether it is derived directly from the underlying mantle, or from the mantle wedge to the east. The chemistry of erupted basalts associated with the MTJ are typical of mantle wedge–derived melts, characterized by enrichment in the large-ion lithophile elements and depletion in the high-field-strength elements. In general, mantle wedge-derived melts are relatively more hydrous, have lower viscosity and temperatures than melts derived from sub-slab mantle.

== Seismicity ==
Most of the seismicity near the MTJ is offshore, concentrated along the Mendocino Transform Fault. Seismicity is also distributed within the Gorda plate itself, owing to its small size, young age, and relatively thin lithosphere. Oblique convergence of the Gorda plate towards the Pacific plate causes intense north–south compression, and induces anomalously strong internal deformation in the former, giving rise to the Gorda Deformation Zone (GDZ) and resulting in abundant seismicity. Motion along the Mendocino Transform Fault (MTF) is right-lateral on E–W oriented, vertically dipping planes. Within the portion of North American crust overlying the Gorda slab, motion on faults is reverse, and in April 1992, a M 7.1 earthquake ruptured the southern portion of the Cascadia subduction zone. Similar to the general seismicity patterns in the region, the majority of the aftershocks for this event had vertical strike-slip motions and were located within the Gorda plate, or on the MTF at depths between 23 and 35 km. None of the aftershocks were consistent with northeast underthrusting of the Gorda plate beneath North America, as was the case in the main event. This set of earthquake geometries implies a stress field characterized by N–NW, horizontal principal compressive stress consistent with the orientation of compression in the GDZ northwest of the MTJ.
