= Brian Atwater =

American geologist (born 1951)

Brian Franklin Atwater (born September 18, 1951) is a geologist who works for the United States Geological Survey and is also a research professor at the University of Washington.

== Career ==
Atwater has spent much of his career studying the likelihood of large earthquakes and tsunamis in the Pacific Northwest region of North America. In 2005, he published a book with others, "The Orphan Tsunami of 1700," that summarizes the evidence for an 8.7–9.2 M_{w} megathrust earthquake in the Pacific Northwest on 26 January 1700, known as the 1700 Cascadia earthquake. The earthquake produced a tsunami so large that contemporary reports in Japan noted it, allowing Atwater's team to assign a precise date and approximate magnitude to the earthquake. Its occurrence and size are confirmed by evidence of a dramatic drop in the elevation of Northwest coastal land, recorded by buried marsh and forest soils that underlie tidal sediment, the deposition of a layer of tsunami sand on the subsided landscape, the death or injury of affected trees (see dendrochronology), and descriptions of the earthquake and tsunami in regional Amerindian legends.

=== Other works ===
Atwater has also authored various supporting papers about earthquakes around the Pacific Rim and about other geological topics including great glacial floods in Washington state, and the natural history of San Francisco Bay. In 2006 he began reconnaissance geologic mapping in coastal Indonesia, part of the ground-truth sleuthing needed to develop a "Smart System" for protecting Indian Ocean communities from future tsunamis. In 2015, Atwater appeared, as a geologist, in the PBS documentary film, Making North America.

== Education ==
Atwater was born in New Britain, Connecticut, and educated at Northfield Mount Hermon, a boarding school in Gill, Massachusetts. He received his bachelor's and master's degrees in geology at Stanford University, where he began working for the U.S. Geological Survey, while dabbling in political activism. Atwater received his PhD from the University of Delaware.

== Publications ==
- Ancient Processes At The Site Of Southern San Francisco Bay: Movement Of The Crust And Changes In Sea Level – U.S. Geological Survey (1979)
- Pleistocene glacial-lake deposits of the Sanpoil River valley, northeastern Washington – USGS Bulletin No. 1661 (1986)
- The Orphan Tsunami of 1700—Japanese Clues to a Parent Earthquake in North America – U.S. Geological Survey Professional Paper No. 1707 (2005)
