= Cascadia subduction zone =

Tectonic boundary in North America

Coordinates: 45°N 124°W

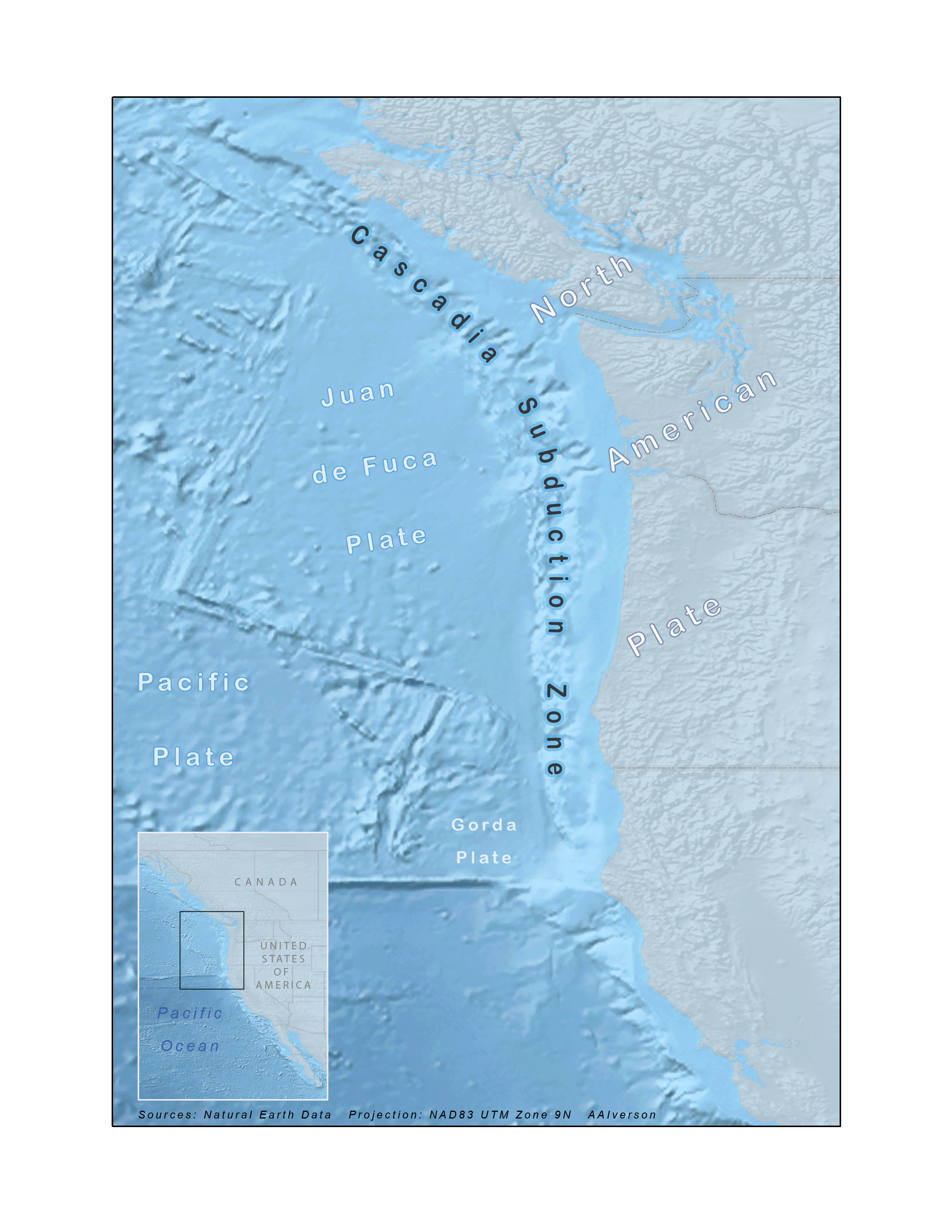
Area of the Cascadia subduction zone (left) and a USGS scenario ShakeMap for a M_{w}9.0 event

The Cascadia subduction zone is a 620-mile (1,000 km) long convergent plate boundary, about 70–100 miles (110–160 kilometers) off the Pacific coast of North America, that stretches from northern Vancouver Island in Canada to Northern California in the United States. It is capable of producing 9.0+ magnitude earthquakes and tsunamis that could reach 100 feet (30 m) high. The Oregon Department of Emergency Management estimates shaking would last 5–7 minutes along the coast, with strength and intensity decreasing further from the epicenter. It is a very long, sloping subduction zone where the Explorer, Juan de Fuca, and Gorda plates move to the east and slide below the much larger, mostly continental North American plate. The zone varies in width and lies offshore beginning near Cape Mendocino, Northern California, passing through Oregon and Washington, and terminating in Canada at about Vancouver Island in British Columbia.

The Explorer, Juan de Fuca, and Gorda plates are some of the remnants of the vast ancient Farallon plate which is now mostly subducted under the North American plate. The North American plate itself is moving slowly in a generally southwest direction, sliding over the smaller plates as well as the huge oceanic Pacific plate (which is moving in a northwest direction) in other locations such as the San Andreas Fault in central and southern California.

Tectonic processes active in the Cascadia subduction zone region include accretion, subduction, deep earthquakes, and active volcanism of the Cascades. This volcanism has included such notable eruptions as Mount Mazama (Crater Lake) about 7,500 years ago, the Mount Meager massif (Bridge River Vent) about 2,350 years ago, and Mount St. Helens in 1980. Major cities affected by a disturbance in this subduction zone include Vancouver and Victoria, British Columbia; Seattle and Tacoma, Washington; and Portland, Oregon.

== History ==
=== Tradition ===
There are no contemporaneous written records of the 1700 Cascadia earthquake. Orally transmitted legends from the Olympic Peninsula area tell of an epic battle between a thunderbird and a whale. In 2005, seismologist Ruth Ludwin set out to collect and analyze anecdotes from various First Nations groups. Reports from the Huu-ay-aht, Makah, Hoh, Quileute, Yurok, and Duwamish peoples referred to earthquakes and saltwater floods. This collection of data allowed the researchers to come up with an estimated date range for the event; the midpoint was in the year 1701.

=== Ghost forests ===
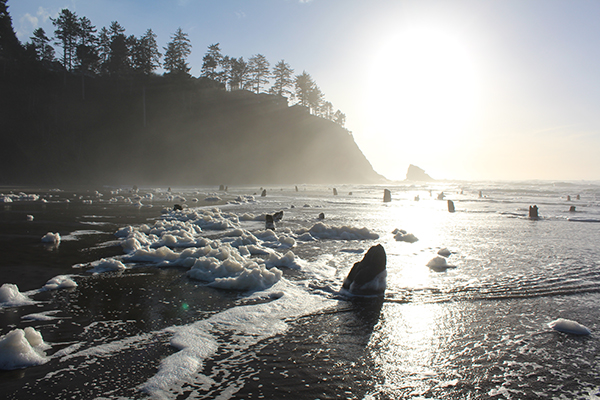
Stumps of trees at the Neskowin Ghost Forest

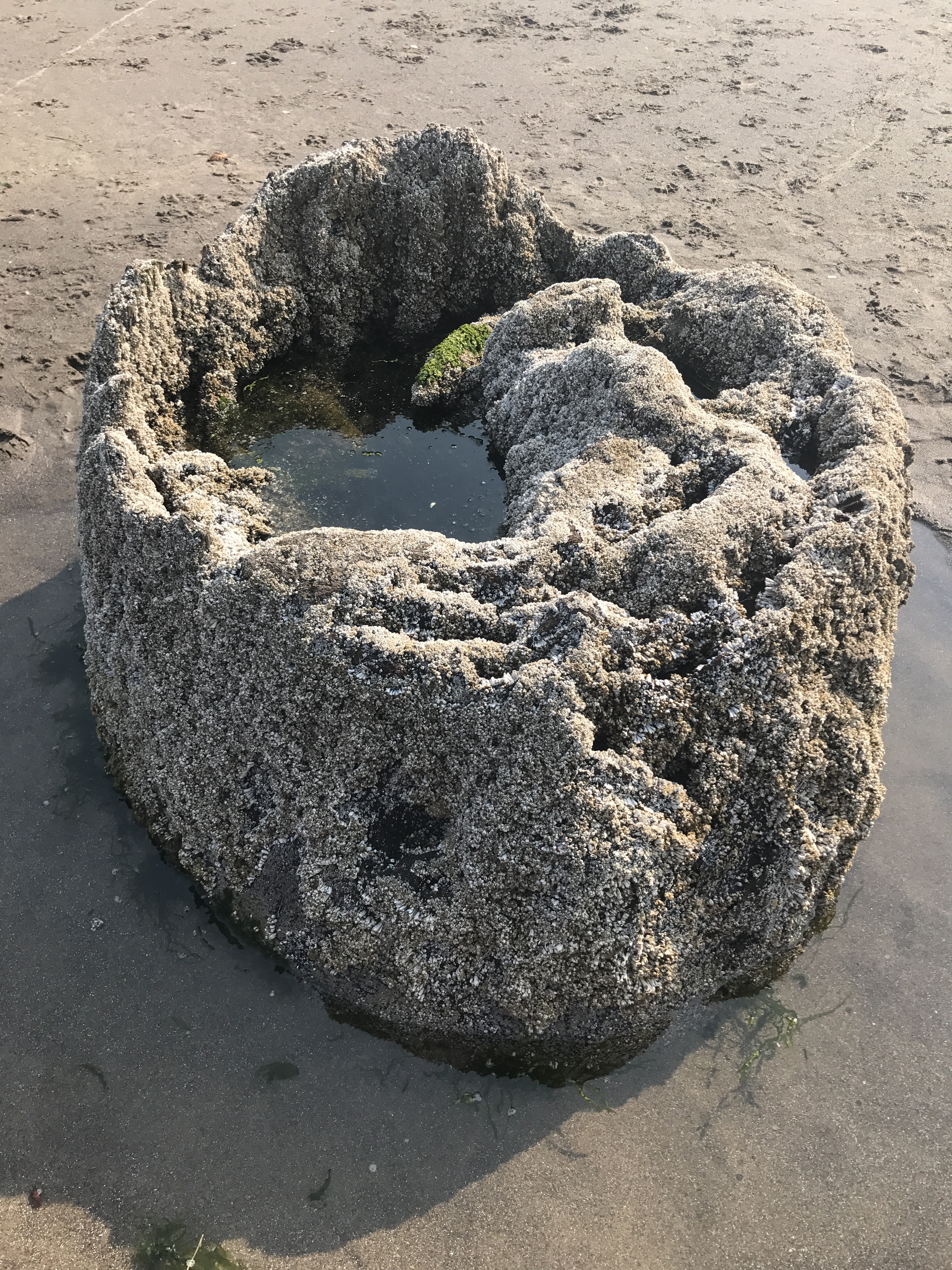
Large tree stump protruding from beach sand

During low tide one day in March 1986, paleogeologist Brian Atwater dug along Neah Bay with a nejiri gama, a small hand hoe. Under a top layer of sand, he uncovered a distinct plant—arrowgrass—that had grown in a layer of marsh soil. This finding was evidence that the ground had suddenly sunk under sea level, causing saltwater to kill the vegetation. The event had happened so quickly that the top layer of sand sealed away the air, thus preserving centuries-old plants.

In 1987, Atwater mounted another expedition paddling up the Copalis River with Dr. David Yamaguchi, who was then studying the eruptions of Mount St. Helens. The pair happened upon a section of "ghost forest", so named due to the dead, gray stumps left standing after a sudden inundation of salt water had killed them hundreds of years ago. Originally thought to have died slowly due to a gradual rise in sea level, closer inspection yielded a different story: the land plummeted up to two meters during an earthquake. Having initially tested spruce using dendrochronology (tree-ring dating), they found that the stumps were too rotted to count all the outer rings. However, upon having examined those of the western red cedar and comparing them to the living specimens meters away from the banks, they were able to approximate their year of death. There were rings until the year 1699, indicating that the incident had occurred shortly thereafter. Root samples confirmed their conclusion, narrowing the time frame to the winter of 1699 to 1700.

As with the arrowgrass site, the banks of the Copalis River are lined with a layer of marsh followed by a layer of sand. Jody Bourgeois and her team went on to demonstrate that the sand cover had originated with a tsunami surge rather than a storm surge.

In 1995, an international team led by Alan Nelson of the USGS further corroborated these findings with 85 new samples from the rest of the Pacific Northwest. All along British Columbia, Washington State, and Oregon, the coast had fallen due to a violent earthquake and been covered by sand from the subsequent tsunami.

A further ghost forest was identified by Gordon Jacoby, a dendrochronologist from Columbia University, 60 feet (18 m) underwater in Lake Washington. Unlike the other trees, these suffered from a landslide rather than a dip in the fault during a separate event around 900 CE.

=== Activity ===
In the 1960s, underground fractures were uncovered by oil companies in Puget Sound. These were believed to be inactive through the 1990s.

In the 1980s, geophysicists Tom Heaton and Hiroo Kanamori of Caltech compared the generally quiet Cascadia to more active subduction zones elsewhere in the Ring of Fire. They found similarities to faults in Chile, Alaska, and Japan's Nankai Trough, locations known for megathrust earthquakes—a conclusion that at the time was met with skepticism from other geophysicists.

=== Orphan tsunami ===
A 1996 study published by seismologist Kenji Satake supplemented the research by Atwater et al. with tsunami evidence across the Pacific. Japanese annals, which have recorded natural disasters since approximately 600 CE, had reports of a sixteen-foot tsunami that struck the coast of Honshu Island during the Genroku era. Since no earthquake had been observed to produce it, scholars dubbed it an "orphan tsunami". Translating the Japanese calendar, Satake found the incident had taken place around midnight of 27–28 January 1700, ten hours after the earthquake occurred. The original magnitude 9.0 earthquake in the Pacific Northwest had thus occurred around 9 pm Pacific Standard Time on 26 January 1700.

== Geophysics ==
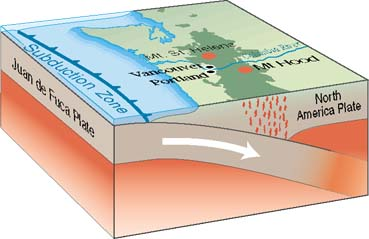
Structure of the Cascadia subduction zone

The Cascadia subduction zone is a 620-mile-long (1,000 km) dipping fault that stretches from Northern Vancouver Island to Cape Mendocino in northern California. It separates the Juan de Fuca and North America plates. New Juan de Fuca plate is created offshore along the Juan de Fuca Ridge.

The Juan de Fuca plate moves toward, and eventually is pushed under the continent (North American plate). The zone separates the Juan de Fuca plate, Explorer plate, Gorda plate, and North American plate. Here, the oceanic crust of the Pacific Ocean has been sinking beneath the continent for about 200 million years, and currently does so at a rate of approximately 40 mm/yr.

At depths shallower than 19 mi (30 km) or so, the Cascadia zone is locked by friction while stress slowly builds as the subduction forces act, until the fault's frictional strength is exceeded and the rocks slip past each other along the fault in a megathrust earthquake. Below 19 mi (30 km), the plate interface exhibits episodic tremor and slip.

The width of the Cascadia subduction zone varies along its length, depending on the angle of the subducted oceanic plate, which heats as it is pushed deeper beneath the continent. As the edge of the plate sinks and becomes hotter and more molten, the subducting rock eventually loses the ability to store mechanical stress; earthquakes may result. On the Hyndman and Wang diagram (not shown, click on reference link below) the "locked" zone is storing energy for an earthquake, and the "transition" zone, although somewhat plastic, could probably rupture.

The Cascadia subduction zone runs from triple junctions at its north and south ends. To the north, just below Haida Gwaii, it intersects the Queen Charlotte Fault and the Explorer Ridge. To the south, just off Cape Mendocino in California, it intersects the San Andreas Fault and the Mendocino fracture zone at the Mendocino triple junction.

== Recent seismicity ==
Subduction zones experience various types of earthquakes (or seismicity); including slow earthquakes, megathrust earthquakes, interplate earthquakes, and intraplate earthquakes. Unlike other subduction zones on Earth, Cascadia currently experiences low levels of seismicity and has not generated a megathrust earthquake since January 26, 1700. Despite low levels of seismicity compared to other subduction zones, Cascadia hosts various types of earthquakes that are recorded by seismic and geodetic instruments, such as seismometers and GNSS receivers.

Tremor, a type of slow fault slip, occurs along almost the length of Cascadia at regular intervals of 13–16 months. Tremor occurs deeper on the subduction interface than the locked area where megathrust earthquakes occur. The depth of tremor along the subduction interface in Cascadia ranges from 17 to 28 mi (28 to 45 km), and the motion is so slow that it is not felt at the surface by people or animals, but it can be measured geodetically. The highest density of tremor activity in Cascadia occurs from northern Washington into southern Vancouver Island, and in northern California. Tremor in Cascadia is monitored by the Pacific Northwest Seismic Network's semi-automatic tremor detection system.

The majority of interplate earthquakes, or earthquakes that occur near the boundaries of tectonic plates, near the Cascadia subduction zone occur in the forearc of the overriding North American plate in Washington, west of the Cascade Volcanic Arc and east of where tremor occurs. These earthquakes are sometimes referred to as crustal earthquakes, and they are capable of causing significant damage due to their relatively shallow depths. A damaging magnitude 7 interplate earthquake occurred on the Seattle Fault around 900–930 CE that generated 3 meters of uplift and a 4–5 meter tsunami. A substantial number of forearc interplate earthquakes also occur in northern California. Much less interplate seismicity occurs in Oregon compared to Washington and northern California, although Oregon hosts more volcanic activity than its neighboring states.

Intraslab earthquakes, frequently associated with stresses within the subducting plate in convergent margins, occur most frequently in northern Cascadia along the west coast of Vancouver Island and in Puget Sound, and in southern Cascadia within the subducting Gorda plate, near the Mendocino triple junction offshore of northern California. The 1949 Olympia earthquake was a damaging magnitude 6.7 intraslab earthquake that occurred at a 32-mile (52 km) depth and caused eight deaths. Another notable intraslab earthquake in the Puget Sound region was the magnitude 6.8 2001 Nisqually earthquake. Intraslab earthquakes in Cascadia occur in areas where the subducting plate has high curvature. Much of the seismicity that occurs off the coast of northern California is due to intraplate deformation within the Gorda plate. Similar to the distribution of interplate earthquakes in Cascadia, intraslab earthquakes are infrequent in Oregon, with its strongest earthquake since statehood being the 5.6 magnitude 1993 Scotts Mills earthquake, an oblique-slip quake.

== Megathrust earthquakes ==
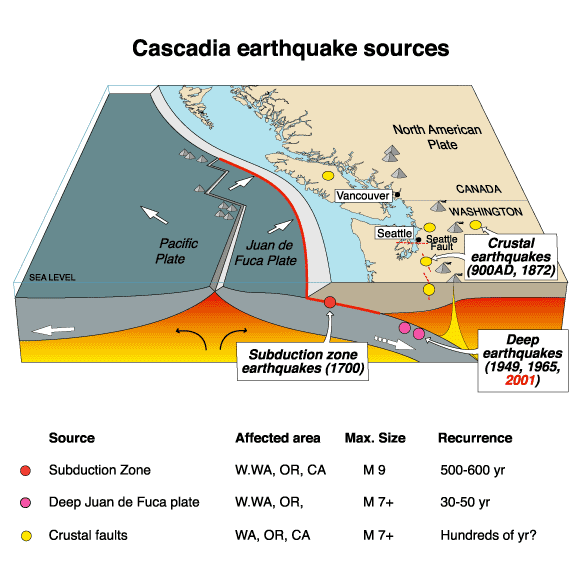
3D bloc of Cascadia subduction zone with earthquake sources

=== Earthquake effects ===
Megathrust earthquakes are the most powerful earthquakes known to occur, and can exceed magnitude 9.0, which releases 1,000 times more energy than magnitude 7.0 and 1 million times more energy than a magnitude 5.0. They occur when enough energy (stress) has accumulated in the "locked" zone of the fault to cause a rupture. The magnitude of a megathrust earthquake is proportional to length of the rupture along the fault. The Cascadia subduction zone, which forms the boundary between the Juan de Fuca and North American plates, is a very long sloping fault that stretches from mid-Vancouver Island to Northern California.

Because of the great length of the fault, the Cascadia subduction zone is capable of producing very large earthquakes if a rupture occurs along its entire length. Thermal and deformation studies indicate that the region 40 mi (64 km) downdip (east) of the deformation front (where plate deformation begins) is fully locked (the plates do not move past each other). Further downdip, there is a transition from fully locked to aseismic sliding.

In 1999, a group of Continuous Global Positioning System sites registered a brief reversal of motion of approximately 2 centimeters (0.8 inches) over a 30-mile by 200-mile area. The movement was the equivalent of a 6.7 magnitude earthquake. The motion did not trigger an earthquake and was only detectable as silent, non-earthquake seismic signatures.

In 2004, a study conducted by the Geological Society of America analyzed the potential for land subsidence along the Cascadia subduction zone. It postulated that several towns and cities on the west coast of Vancouver Island, such as Tofino and Ucluelet, are at risk for a sudden, earthquake initiated, 1–2 meter subsidence.

=== San Andreas Fault connection ===
Studies of past earthquake traces on the northern San Andreas Fault and the southern Cascadia subduction zone indicate a correlation in time which may be evidence that quakes on the Cascadia subduction zone may have triggered most of the major quakes on the northern San Andreas Fault during at least the past 3,000 years or so. The evidence also shows the rupture direction going from north to south in each of these time-correlated events. The 1906 San Francisco earthquake seems to have been a major exception to this correlation, however, as it was not preceded by a major Cascadia quake.

=== Earthquake timing ===
Great earthquakes
Estimated Year		Interval
2005 source	2003 source	(years)
About 9 p.m., January 26, 1700 (NS)		780
780–1190 CE	880–960 CE	210
690–730 CE	550–750 CE	330
350–420 CE	250–320 CE	910
660–440 BCE	610–450 BCE	400
980–890 BCE	910–780 BCE	250
1440–1340 BCE	1150–1220 BCE	unknown

The last known great earthquake in the northwest was the 1700 Cascadia earthquake, 326 years ago. Geological evidence indicates that great earthquakes (> magnitude 8.0) may have occurred sporadically at least seven times in the last 3,500 years, suggesting a return time of about 500 years. Seafloor core evidence indicates that there have been forty-one subduction zone earthquakes on the Cascadia subduction zone in the past 10,000 years, suggesting a general average earthquake recurrence interval of only 243 years. Of these 41, nineteen have produced a "full margin rupture", wherein the entire fault opens. By comparison, similar subduction zones in the world usually have such earthquakes every 100 to 200 years; the longer interval here may indicate unusually large stress buildups and subsequent unusually large earthquake slips.

There is also evidence of accompanying tsunamis with every earthquake. One strong line of evidence for these earthquakes is convergent timings for fossil damage from tsunamis in the Pacific Northwest and historical Japanese records of tsunamis.

The next rupture of the Cascadia subduction zone is anticipated to be capable of causing widespread destruction throughout the Pacific Northwest.

=== Forecasts of the next major earthquake ===
Prior to the 1980s, scientists thought that the subduction zone did not generate earthquakes like other subduction zones around the world, but research by Brian Atwater and Kenji Satake tied together evidence of a large tsunami on the Washington coast with documentation of an orphan tsunami in Japan (a tsunami without an associated earthquake). The two pieces of the puzzle were linked, and they then realized that the subduction zone was more hazardous than previously suggested.

In 2009, some geologists predicted a 10%-to-14% probability that the Cascadia subduction zone will produce an event of magnitude 9.0 or higher in the next 50 years. In 2010, studies suggested that the risk could be as high as 37% for earthquakes of magnitude 8.0 or higher.

Geologists and civil engineers have broadly determined that the Pacific Northwest region is not well prepared for such a colossal earthquake. The earthquake is expected to be similar to the 2011 Tōhoku earthquake and tsunami, because the rupture is expected to be as long as the 2004 Indian Ocean earthquake and tsunami. The resulting tsunami might reach heights of approximately 100 feet. FEMA estimates some 13,000 fatalities from such an event, with another 27,000 injured, which would make it the deadliest natural disaster in American, and North American, history. FEMA further predicts that a million people will be displaced, with yet another 2.5 million requiring food and water. An estimated 1/3 of public safety workers will not respond to the disaster due to a collapse in infrastructure and a desire to ensure the safety of themselves and their loved ones. Other analyses predict that even a magnitude 6.7 earthquake in Seattle would result in 7,700 dead and injured, $33 billion in damage, 39,000 buildings severely damaged or destroyed, and 130 simultaneous fires.

== Cascade Volcanic Arc ==
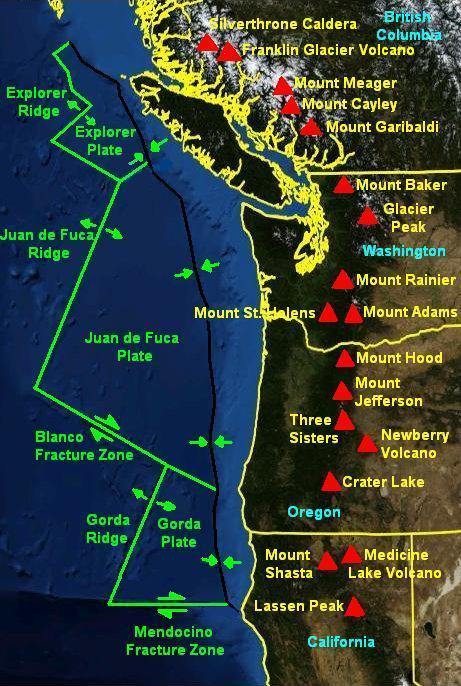
Juan de Fuca triple junctions and the Cascade Volcanic Arc

The Cascade Volcanic Arc is a continental arc of volcanoes that extends from northern California to the coastal peninsula of Alaska. The arc consists of a series of Quaternary age stratovolcanoes that grew on top of pre-existing geologic materials that ranged from Miocene volcanics to glacial ice. The Cascade Volcanic arc is located approximately 100 kilometers or 62 miles inland from the coast, and forms a north-to-south chain of peaks that average over 10,000 feet (3,000 m) in elevation. The major peaks from south to north include:

- Lassen Peak and Mount Shasta (California)
- Crater Lake (Mazama), Three Sisters, Mount Jefferson, Mount Hood (Oregon)
- Mount Adams, Mount St. Helens, Mount Rainier, Glacier Peak, Mount Baker (Washington)
- Mount Garibaldi and Mount Meager massif (British Columbia)

The most active volcanoes in the chain include Mount St. Helens, Mount Baker, Lassen Peak, Mount Shasta, and Mount Hood. Mount St. Helens captured worldwide attention when it erupted catastrophically in 1980. St. Helens continues to rumble, albeit more quietly, emitting occasional steam plumes and experiencing small earthquakes, both signs of continuing magmatic activity.

Most of the volcanoes have a main, central vent from which the most recent eruptions have occurred. The peaks are composed of layers of solidified andesitic to dacitic magma, and the more siliceous (and explosive) rhyolite.

=== Volcanoes above the subduction zone ===
The volcanoes above the subduction zone include:

- Silverthrone Caldera
- Mount Meager massif
- Mount Cayley
- Mount Garibaldi
- Mount Baker
- Glacier Peak
- Mount Rainier
- Mount St. Helens
- Mount Adams
- Mount Hood
- Mount Jefferson
- Three Sisters
- Newberry Volcano
- Mount Mazama (Crater Lake)
- Mount McLoughlin
- Medicine Lake Volcano
- Mount Shasta
- Lassen Peak
- Black Butte
- Black Butte (California)

== See also ==
- Astoria Fan
- Cascade Range
  - Outline of the Cascade Range
- Pacific Northwest
- Cascadia Channel
- Cascadia Region Earthquake Science Center (CRESCENT)
- Geology of the Pacific Northwest
- Neskowin Ghost Forest
- North Cascades National Park
- Plate tectonics
