= Abyssal channel =

Channels in the sea floor formed by fast-flowing turbidity currents

Abyssal channels (also, deep-sea channels, underwater channels) are channels in Earth's sea floor. They are formed by fast-flowing floods of turbid water caused by avalanches near the channel's head, with the sediment carried by the water causing a build-up of the surrounding abyssal plains. Submarine channels and the turbidite systems which form them are responsible for the accumulation of most sandstone deposits found on continental slopes and have proven to be one of the most common types of hydrocarbon reservoirs found in these regions.

Submarine channels and their flanking levees are commonly referred to as channel levee systems. They are significant geomorphological features that may run for thousands of kilometres across the ocean floor. Often, they coalesce and overlap to form channel levee complexes which are the building blocks of many major submarine fans. This makes them one of several geological processes responsible for the transport of coarse-grained sediment into deep water, as well as being a chief conduit for the transfer of carbon from the continental shelf to the deeper parts of the continental margins.

They do, however, remain one of the least understood sedimentary processes.

The effect of Earth's rotation causes more sediment to build up on one side of the channel than on the other.

What constitutes a channel is not straight forward. Different terms are used on a per study basis, all of which have similar but not quite interchangeable definitions. There have been efforts to produce an up-to-date, holistic view, but even since then there has been a significant number of papers which take concepts even further.

There are numerous terms that are used to describe the features contained in this study, including geo-body, channel complex, channel storey, channel complex set, and confined channel complex system. These cover single channels, a single channel and associated sediments or multiple channels grouped. Flood (2001) defines a channel-levee system as a single channel with a levee at each side. These levees are formed by the overspilling and flow stripping of turbidity currents. These are most likely to occur during sea level lowstands. A collection of these channels and levees along with overbank sediments form a channel-levee complex.

They can be V or U in shape, have the presence or lack of depositional margins, highly sinuous or straight.

== Architecture and nomenclature ==
Ian Kane advocates the use of the terms internal levee and external levee to avoid confusion in the literature concerning the use of "inner" and "outer" levees. To help encourage this unification of phrases into a clearer architectural hierarchy, this study will use Kane's nomenclature.

External levees are a dominantly depositional body forming a constructional wedge of sediment that thins perpendicularly away from a channel-belt. The external levee forms during the evolution of a genetically related channel-belt (or slope valley, channel fairway) by flows that partially spill out of their confinement. External levees can confine adjacent channel belts to form levee-confined systems. External levees may be much less sinuous than the levees of an individual channel-levee system as they do not follow one particular channel but may be the product of overspill from one or more channels or channel-levee systems meandering within the wider channel-belt. The levee crest is the highest point of the external levee, and runs parallel to the course of the channel-belt, separating the external levees into outer external levees and inner external levees.

Internal levees are constructional features fed by flows that partially spilled out of channelised confinement, but were largely unable to escape the confinement of the channel-belt. The flows which build internal levees may interact with the main confining surface, i.e., the external levees, and/or the channel-belt erosion surface, and are liable to erosion by the migration or avulsions of channel thalwegs, and the overbank passage of large flows not confined by the internal levees. As a consequence of lateral migration, internal levees may be better preserved on inner bends. Internal levees form only when confinement has been established, through the construction of external levees and/or the degradation and entrenchment of the composite erosion surface of the channel-belt, or confined within canyons. Internal levees may form distinct wedges of sediment where enough space is available; where space is limited, i.e., where overspill from underfit channels interacts with external levees or erosional confinement, overspill deposits may appear superficially similar to terrace deposits, which are widely identified in the subsurface.

== Channel sinuosity and migration ==
Sinuosity in submarine channels is a feature regularly observed on seismic maps. It can vary between occasional low amplitude bends to highly sinuous, densely looping channels. Channel sinuosity results in significant migration lateral and affects continuity of facies associated with both channel sediments and surrounding deep water sediments. Although it is not always clear how these sinuosities evolve, they typically do not result from a random wandering. In most cases, the wandering and changes in sinuosity is as a result of external forces. As a result of this, PJeff Peakall advocates the avoidance of the term meandering to describe this sinuosity, a phrase used to describe similar sinuosity observed in terrestrial fluvial systems.

There seems to be a potential consensus that truly sinuous channel can be defined as one that displays a minimum average sinuosity of between 1.2 and 1.15. Difficulty with rigorous application of these values is that relatively straight channels may locally exceed them and some sinuous channels may display peak sinuosity values well in excess.

The sinuosity of submarine channels is a characteristic instantly recognizable as being shared with fluvial systems. In recent years there are increasingly mixed opinions in academic literature as to how far they are analogous to each other with some feeling that such notions of similarity should not hold. The best description is that the two are similar in some ways but more variable and complex in other. This applies to both the geometry of morphological features, the processes involved in forming them as well as the character of the deposits formed.

Mike Mayall provides the best summary that discusses the causes of sinuosity. Factors involve: flow dynamics such as flow density and flow velocity; and the depth of the current relative to topography; and topographic and morphological controls such; shape channel cross section, slope topography, erosive base at flow onset and the effects of both lateral stacking and lateral accretion. Compared to their terrestrial cousins, the scale of submarine systems observed in seismic sections, aerial photos and rock outcrops are in no way comparable. As expected with this significant difference in scale, the dynamics of turbid current flows within submarine channels are significantly different from fluvial systems. These differences in dynamics and scale are due to the much lower density contrast between the flow and the host fluid is much lower in submarine channels than that of open channel flows with a free surface. This causes the flow to be significantly super-elevated about the channel margin causing overspill and building the levees.

Lateral migration and accretion plays an important part in fluvial systems. It is the feature of submarine channels that is most analogous with its terrestrial counterpart. It consists of erosion on the outerbank and deposition on the inner bank as a point bar. However, there are significant dissimilarities the biggest in that submarine channels can exhibit both lateral and vertical migration. Fluvial systems do not exhibit this vertical component. Lateral accretion packages are believed to form as a result of depositional rather than topographical forcing. This lateral migration only style of sinuosity is believed to be somewhat rare in occurrence within turbidite systems.

Vertical migration is exhibited in submarine channels systems in the form of channel stacking. As flows in channels subside, channels are infilled with sediment. When the flow is re-initiated, there is then a slight shift laterally in the flow thalweg causing a displaced incision. Mayall suggests that this vertical movement could be as a result of changes in seafloor topography due to salt/shale tectonics or fault movement. The other alternative they suggest is through undefined “depositional processes”. One potential process may be as a result of heterogeneous infilling of the older channel forming an offset conduit for later flows. Whatever the process this stacking plays an important role in aggradational systems and potentially is one of the leading controls in the formation of levee confined complexes. In terms of sinuosity, Mayall shows that this vertical migration occurs on the outward sides of bends reinforcing any pre-existing curvature.

Aggradational channels commonly form where the slope is “below grade.” This results in the deposition of broad, amalgamated and highly sand rich channels which are significantly affected by the slope morphology. The channel width versus slope relationship is control by the Froude number of flows along the channel. When Froude numbers are low (<1.0) channel widths remain constant, however when Froude number oscillate around unity, channel widths fall rapidly with channel-floor slope. This provides a mechanism for generating channel widths capable of maintaining near-critical flow by channel narrowing and enhanced sedimentation. This behavior is controlled by an unknown constant that could not be found experimentally.

The morphology and topography of the slope that any turbidite channel crosses is inevitably going to affect the geometry of the channel. This can result in subtle changes in channel path to major diversions in channel flow. Topographic influences can come in the form of the surface expression of faults or changes in topography as a result of salt/shale tectonics, whether through diapirism or subsurface folding.

== Underwater waves ==
Underwater channels can carry underwater waves.

== See also ==
- Abyssal fan
- List of landforms § Coastal and oceanic landforms
- Northwest Atlantic Mid-Ocean Channel
- Sea mount
- Sea basin
- Sea canyon
- Submarine canyon
- Turbidity current
