= Astoria Canyon =

Submarine canyon on Columbia river

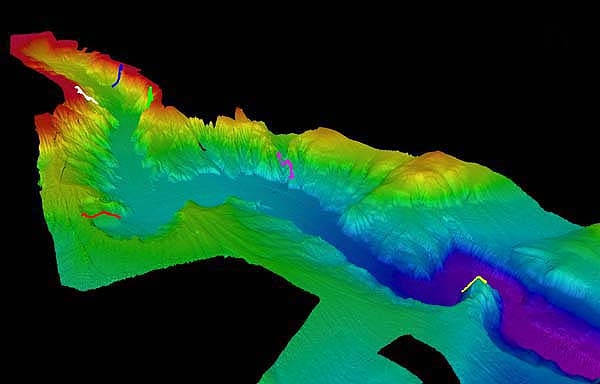
3D topographic view of the Astoria Canyon

Astoria Canyon is a submarine canyon 10 miles (16 km) offshore from the mouth of the Columbia River.

The Missoula Floods helped carve Astoria Canyon.

== See also ==
- Astoria Fan
