= Juan de Fuca plate =

Small tectonic plate in the eastern North Pacific

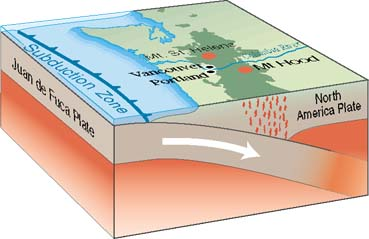
Cutaway of the Juan de Fuca microplate Image source: USGS

The Juan de Fuca plate or Juan de Fuca microplate is a small oceanic tectonic plate (microplate) generated from the Juan de Fuca Ridge that is subducting beneath the northerly portion of the western side of the North American plate at the Cascadia subduction zone. It is named after the explorer of the same name. One of the smallest of Earth's tectonic plates, the Juan de Fuca microplate is a remnant part of the once-vast Farallon plate, which is now largely subducted underneath the North American plate.

In plate tectonic reconstructions, the Juan de Fuca microplate is referred to as the Vancouver plate between the break-up of the Farallon plate c. 55–52 Ma and the activation of the San Andreas Fault c. 30 Ma.

== Origins ==
The Juan de Fuca microplate system has its origins with Panthalassa's oceanic basin and crust. This oceanic crust has primarily been subducted under the North American plate, and the Eurasian plate. Panthalassa's oceanic plate remnants are understood to be the Juan de Fuca, Gorda, Cocos and the Nazca plates, all four of which were part of the Farallon plate.

== Extent ==
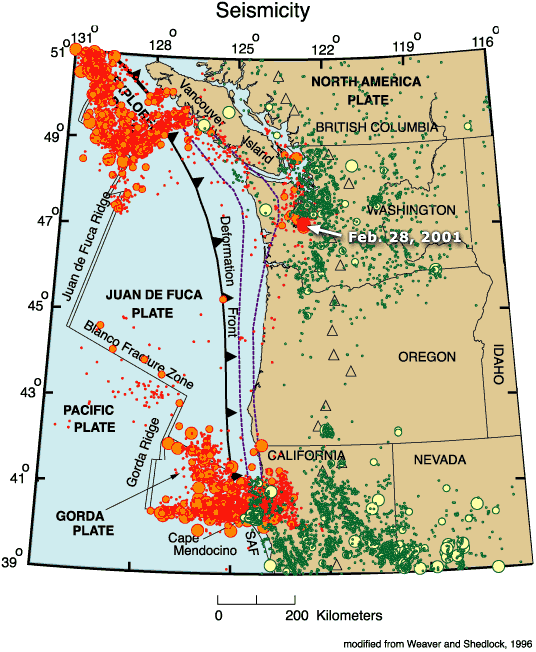
A map of the Juan de Fuca microplate with noted seismic incidents, including the 2001 Nisqually earthquake

The Juan de Fuca microplate is bounded on the south by the Blanco fracture zone (running northwest off the coast of Oregon), on the north by the Nootka Fault (running southwest off Nootka Island, near Vancouver Island, British Columbia) and along the west by the Pacific plate (which covers most of the Pacific Ocean and is the largest of Earth's tectonic plates). The Juan de Fuca microplate itself has since fractured into three pieces, and the name is applied to the entire plate in some references, but in others only to the central portion. The three fragments are differentiated as such: the piece to the south is known as the Gorda plate and the piece to the north is known as the Explorer plate. The separate pieces are demarcated by the large offsets of the undersea spreading zone.

== Volcanism ==
This subducting plate system has formed the Cascade Range, the Cascade Volcanic Arc, and the Pacific Ranges, along the west coast of North America from southern British Columbia to northern California. These in turn are part of the Pacific Ring of Fire, a much larger-scale volcanic feature that extends around much of the rim of the Pacific Ocean.

== Earthquakes ==
The last megathrust earthquake at the Cascadia subduction zone was the 1700 Cascadia earthquake, estimated to have a moment magnitude of 8.7 to 9.2. Based on carbon dating of local tsunami deposits, it is inferred to have occurred around 1700. Evidence of this earthquake is also seen in the ghost forest along the bank of the Copalis River in Washington. The rings of the dead trees indicate that they died around 1700, and it is believed that they were killed when the earthquake occurred and sank the ground beneath them causing the trees to be flooded by saltwater. Japanese records indicate that a tsunami occurred in Japan on 26 January 1700, which was likely caused by this earthquake.

In 2008, small earthquakes were observed within the Juan de Fuca microplate. The unusual quakes were described as "more than 600 quakes over the past 10 days in a basin 150 miles [240 km] southwest of Newport". The quakes were unlike most quakes in that they did not follow the pattern of a large quake, followed by smaller aftershocks; rather, they were simply a continual deluge of small quakes. Furthermore, they did not occur on the tectonic plate boundary, but rather in the middle of the plate. The subterranean quakes were detected on hydrophones, and scientists described the sounds as similar to thunder, and unlike anything previously recorded.

== Carbon sequestration potential ==
The basaltic formations of the Juan de Fuca microplate could potentially be suitable for long-term CO_{2} sequestration as part of a carbon capture and storage (CCS) system. Injection of CO_{2} would lead to the formation of stable carbonates. It is estimated that 100 years of US carbon emissions (at current rate) could be stored securely, without risk of leakage back into the atmosphere.

== Tearing ==
In 2019, scientists from the University of California, Berkeley, published a study in Geophysical Research Letters in which they reported that by utilizing data from over 30,000 seismic waves and 217 earthquakes to create a three-dimensional map, they had revealed the existence of a hole in the subducted part of the Juan de Fuca microplate, and speculated that the hole is an indication of a 150 kilometres (93 mi) deep tear in the plate along a "preexisting zone of weakness". According to William B. Hawley and Richard M. Allen, the authors of the study, the hole may be the cause of volcanism and earthquakes on the plate, and is causing deformation of the offshore part of the plate. The deformation may cause the plate to fragment, with the remaining un-subducted small pieces becoming attached to other plates nearby.

A 2025 study published in Science Advances documented direct observational evidence of a subduction zone in the process of terminating, at the northern end of the Cascadia subduction zone off Vancouver Island, British Columbia. Using seismic reflection imaging collected during the 2021 Cascadia Seismic Imaging Experiment (CASIE21), researchers identified a 75-kilometer-long fault system along which the subducting Juan de Fuca and Explorer plates are fracturing into smaller pieces, including a section where the plate has vertically displaced by roughly five kilometers.

The study found that seismicity is absent in sections of the tear where the plate has already detached, but continues where it remains attached, indicating that termination occurs gradually and in stages rather than in a single event. Each individual detachment event was estimated to occur over a timescale of millions of years. The researchers proposed that this mechanism accounts for previously unexplained geological features, such as the fossil microplates of the Farallon plate off Baja California, and offers a broader model for how subduction zones cease activity over geologic time. The study's authors noted that the findings do not alter near-term seismic hazard assessments for the Pacific Northwest, which remains capable of producing large earthquakes and tsunamis.

== Lithosphere–asthenosphere boundary beneath Juan de Fuca ==
In 2016, a geophysical study was published on the possible presence of a layer of buoyant material between the Earth's lithosphere and the asthenosphere under the Juan de Fuca microplate. The study extends the theory of partial melt in the lithosphere-asthenosphere boundary to subduction zones, specifically in the convergent margins.

Using teleseismic body-wave tomography, a low-velocity zone of thickness 50~100 km in the sublithospheric region beneath the Juan de Fuca microplate was detected. The observation, along with fluid-mechanical calculations that factor in Couette and Poiseuille flows, support the hypothesis of the accumulation of a buoyant material, characterized by low viscosity. The exact source of this anomaly remains unknown, although its highly-conductive nature and low-seismic wave velocity are well observed.

== See also ==
- Astoria Fan
- Cascadia Channel
- Geology of the Pacific Northwest
- Plate tectonics
