= Abyssal fan =

Underwater geological structures associated with large-scale sediment deposition

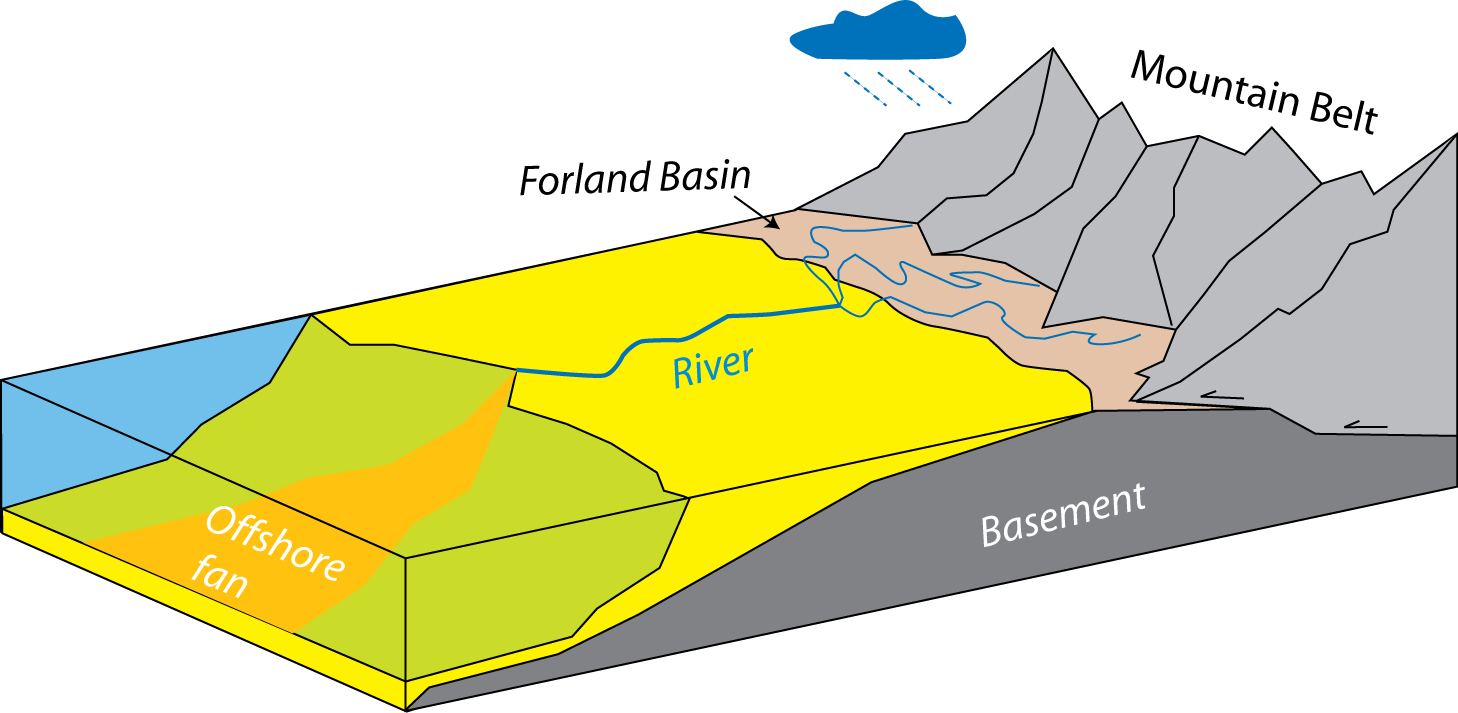
Distribution of detritus in a depositional system

Abyssal fans, also known as deep-sea fans, underwater deltas, and submarine fans, are underwater geological structures associated with large-scale sediment deposition and formed by turbidity currents. They can be thought of as an underwater version of alluvial fans and can vary dramatically in size, with widths from several kilometres to several thousands of kilometres. The largest is the Bengal Fan, followed by the Indus Fan, but major fans are also found at the outlet of the Amazon, Congo, Mississippi and elsewhere.

== Formation ==
Abyssal (or submarine) fans are formed from turbidity currents. These currents begin when a geologic activity pushes sediments over the edge of a continental shelf and down the continental slope, creating an underwater landslide. A dense slurry of muds and sands speeds towards the foot of the slope, until the current slows. The decreasing current, having a reduced ability to transport sediments, then deposits the grains it carries, thus creating a submarine fan. The slurry continues to slow as it is moved towards the continental rise until it reaches the ocean bed. Thus results a series of graded sediments of sand, silt and mud, which are known as turbidites, as described by the Bouma sequence.

== See also ==
- List of oceanic landforms

== Sources ==
- "Turbidites Hold Great Potential for Deepwater Exploration" (PDF). Baker Hughes, Inc. 2000.
- Svetlana Kostic; Gary Parker (2004). "The Response of Turbidity Currents to a Canyon-Fan Transition: Internal Hydraulic Jumps and Depositional Signatures" (PDF). Archived from the original (PDF) on 2008-08-20.
- Allen, Philip & Allen, John, 2005. Basin Analysis: Principles and Applications. 2nd ed. Blackwell.
