= Charles Mader =

Charles Mader may refer to:

- Charles L. Mader (1930–2018), American physical chemist
- Charles Uniacke Mader (1856–1929), merchant and political figure in Nova Scotia, Canada
