= Explorer Seamount =

Seamount off the coast of British Columbia, Canada

- Location within British Columbia
- Summit depth: 830 m (2,723 ft)

Location
- Location: North Pacific Ocean
- Coordinates: 49°05′N 130°48′W
- Country: Canada

Geology
- Type: Submarine volcano

The Explorer Seamount is a seamount located in the Pacific Ocean off the coast of British Columbia, Canada. It is on the Explorer Ridge, a tectonic spreading centre that separates the Pacific and Explorer plates and so the volcanism is rift-related. It is the namesake of the Explorer Ridge.

Explorer Seamount is named after the United States Coast and Geodetic Survey ship USC&GS Explorer (OSS 28), which operated from 1940 to 1943 in the northern Pacific Ocean and the Gulf of Alaska.

== See also ==
- Volcanism of Canada
- Volcanism of Western Canada
- List of volcanoes in Canada
