= 2014 Alaska earthquake =

2014 Alaska earthquake may refer to:

- 2014 Aleutian Islands earthquake, on June 23
- 2014 Palma Bay earthquake, on July 25
