= Sovanco fracture zone =

Transform fault offshore of Vancouver Island, Canada

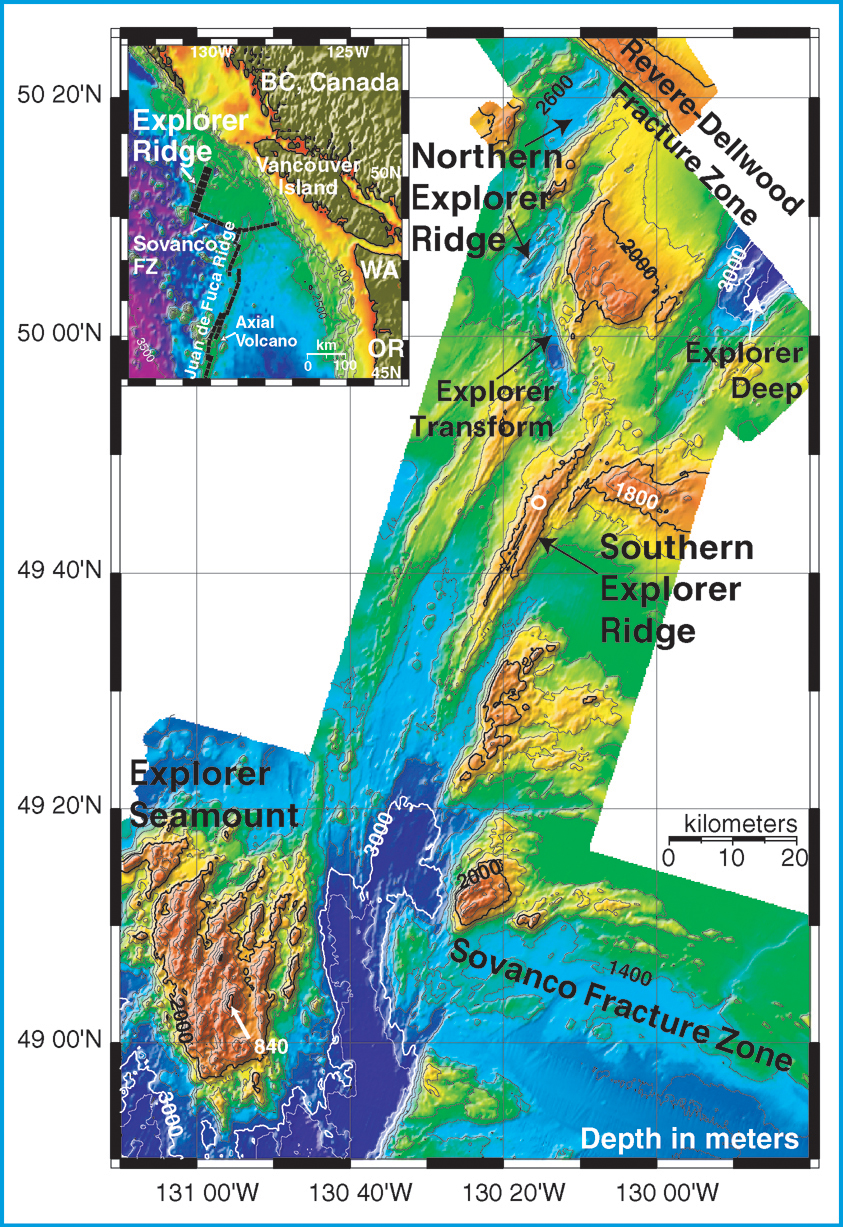
Bathymetry of Explorer Ridge area, including the Sovanco fracture zone

The Sovanco fracture zone is a right lateral-moving transform fault and associated fracture zone located offshore of Vancouver Island in Canada. It runs between the northern end of the Juan de Fuca Ridge and the southern end of the Explorer Ridge, forming part of the boundary between the Pacific plate and the Explorer plate. To its west lies the Explorer Seamount.
