= 1958 Huslia earthquake =

1958 earthquake in Alaska

- Location within Alaska
- UTC time: 1958-04-07 15:30:45
- ISC event: 884131
- USGS-ANSS: ComCat
- Local date: April 7, 1958
- Magnitude: 7.3 M_{s}
- Depth: 6.0–7.0 km
- Epicenter: 65.915°N 156.343°W
- Type: Thrust (intraplate)
- Areas affected: Northern Alaska
- Total damage: Minor
- Max. intensity: MMI VIII (Severe)
- Aftershocks: Yes
- Casualties: None

The 1958 Huslia earthquake on April 7 struck an unusual part of Alaska, near the city of Huslia, about 415 km from Fairbanks. The M_{s} 7.3 earthquake is one of two magnitude 7.0 or greater earthquakes recorded north of 65° latitude, the other being the 1933 Baffin Bay earthquake, and is one of the strongest earthquakes within the interior of the state. The earthquake was a result of compression of the crust due to the subduction of the Pacific plate under the North American plate.

== Earthquake ==
The earthquake was unusual for its location because it was situated in a geologically stable part of the North American plate, more than 965 km from the Aleutian subduction zone; the nearest plate boundary. There are no known visible fault traces in the immediate vicinity of the earthquake other than a thrust fault under the Brooks Range and another strike-slip feature known as the Kaltag Fault. The Koyukuk Basin consists of accretion of volcanic arcs from the Middle Jurassic to Early Cretaceous. P-wave analysis suggests that the earthquake was a result of thrust faulting at a depth of 6 km. The fault plane solution is either a shallow north-northwest dipping plane or a steep south-southwest dipping plane. The earthquake was followed by two moderate aftershocks on April 8 and 12 respectively.

== Effects ==
Shaking from the earthquake reached VIII (Severe) on the Modified Mercalli intensity scale at its maximum within a radius of 40 to 50 miles. Meanwhile, shaking in general was felt for an area of 150,000 square miles. Ice cracks and liquefaction was reported for an area of 400 square miles. Pressure ridges, lakes thawing, and craters 20 feet across and 6 feet deep were reported during a survey. In Huslia, minor damage to roofs and foundations. An old building in Stevens Village was declared unsafe after it was seen that poles supporting its roof had split and broken. Ice from a frozen river cracked and ground fissures opened at Tanana. More damage was reported in other towns.

== See also ==
- 1958 Lituya Bay, Alaska earthquake and megatsunami
- List of earthquakes in 1958
- List of earthquakes in Alaska
