= Charles L. Mader =

American physical chemist

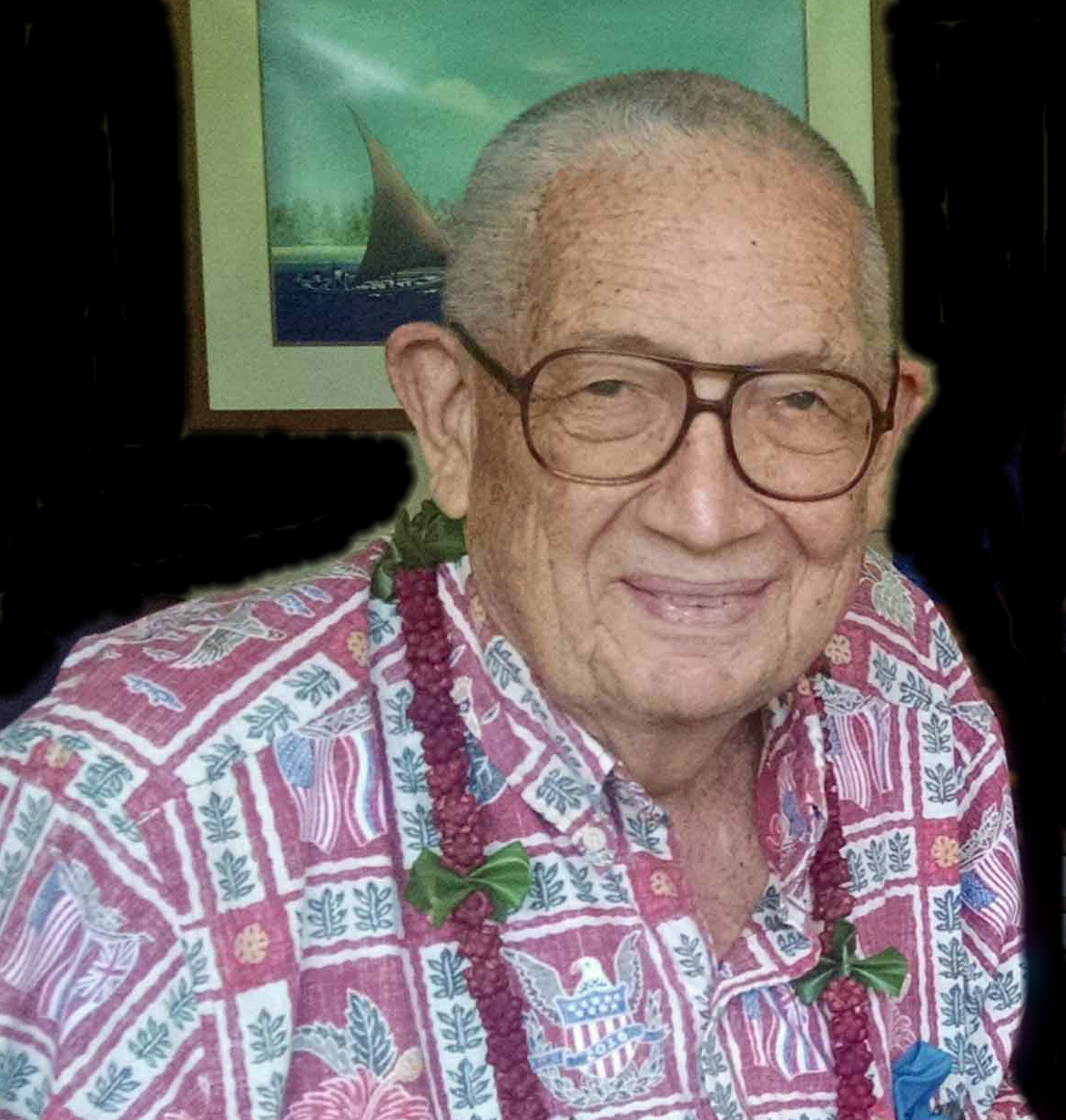
- Mader in August 2016
- Born: August 8, 1930; Dewey, Oklahoma
- Died: August 18, 2018 (aged 88); Los Alamos, New Mexico
- Education: Oklahoma A&M College; Pacific Western University
- Scientific career
- Fields: Chemistry, Numerical Modeling, Explosives, and Tsunami Waves
- Workplaces: Los Alamos National Laboratory; Mader Consulting Co.

Charles Lavern Mader (August 8, 1930 – August 18, 2018) was an American physical chemist known for his work in the fluid dynamics of explosives and water waves. He was a Laboratory Fellow of Los Alamos National Laboratory. He wrote several books on numerical modeling of explosives, propellants, and water waves, and he authored or co-authored over 160 technical papers.

== Education and career ==
Charles L. Mader was a Banning Scholar at Oklahoma City University (1948–1951) and earned his B.S. and M.S. degrees in chemistry from Oklahoma A&M College (now known as Oklahoma State University–Stillwater) (1951–1954). His Master's thesis was on quantitative measurements of the organic acids of sorghum syrup.

During his graduate studies at University of Kansas (1954–1955), he was a 1954 Summer graduate student at Los Alamos Scientific Laboratory (subsequently known as Los Alamos National Laboratory) in New Mexico. He joined Los Alamos as a Staff Member in the Explosive Division (GMX) (1955–1966) and continued in the Theoretical Division (1966–1986). He obtained his Ph.D. from Pacific Western University, Encino, CA (1980). After retirement from Los Alamos, he continued to research and publish.

Mader's expertise has been drawn upon by many, including the Beijing Institute of Technology; the Joint Institute for Marine and Atmospheric Research (JIMAR) at the University of Hawaii at Manoa; the Center for Explosives Technology Research (CETR) at the New Mexico Institute of Mining and Technology; the department of physics at University of New Mexico; the department of oceanography at the University of Hawaii; and the department of marine science at Hawaii Pacific University. He was named a distinguished scientist of the Energetics Research Institute (EnRI) at Nanyang Technology University, Singapore.

== Scientific contributions ==
Mader's research involved the study of the physical chemistry of detonations, explosives, and propellants through laboratory experiments, atmospheric and underground testing, and numerical modeling. He used the numerical models that he developed to predict results that were then experimentally verified. His models also were used to reproduce results derived from previously acquired experimental data. Mader and J. Zinn developed numerical solutions for nonlinear heat conduction equations that agreed with experimental data (1960). Using the Los Alamos IBM-7030 STRETCH computer and the Becker-Kistiakowsky-Wilson equations of state, he developed computer models for the detonation properties of explosives (1963). Using the Los Alamos PHERMEX (Pulsed High-Energy Radiographic Machine Emitting X-rays), he and colleagues extracted experimental data from flash radiographs of explosives and explosive-driven metal systems (1980), (1983).

His book "Numerical Modeling of Detonations" (1979) surveys two decades of numerical modeling of the detonation process for condensed explosives and describes the numerical methods and the reactive dynamics of these materials. His book "Numerical Modeling of Explosives and Propellants" (2007) became a standard text on the chemistry and fluid dynamics of chemical explosive devices.

Mader applied his expertise in fluid dynamics to research in the numerical modeling of tsunamis (1974) and other water waves. Using the full Navier-Stokes AMR (adaptive mesh refinement) Eulerian compressible hydrodynamic computer code called SAGE (SAIC Adaptive Grid Eulerian), software developed by SAIC and Los Alamos, he modeled landslide tsunami hazards, such as the 1958 Lituya Bay megatsunami (2002) and the 1883 eruption of Krakatoa (2006). His models are used to evaluate tsunami flooding and to determine which areas need to be evacuated.

His book "Numerical Modeling of Water Waves" (2004) is a "comprehensive treatise of the evolving science of computer modeling of waves."

== Personal life ==
Mader was an accomplished mountaineer and downhill skier. He was the 65th person to have climbed (1959) all 54 Colorado peaks above 14,000 feet. He and his wife Emma Jean skied sixty years and after marking his 80th birthday, he skied 1.5 million vertical feet. He was devoted to the Boy Scouts of America, serving as Scoutmaster in Los Alamos (1972–1984) and mentoring 48 Scouts to earn their Eagle rank. He was a 3 Bead Woodbadger and was awarded the Silver Beaver (1984). He was a District Commissioner in the Aloha Council of the Boy Scouts.

== Publications ==
=== Books ===
- Mader, C. L. (1979). Numerical Modeling of Detonations. Los Alamos Series in Basic and Applied Sciences, Berkeley: University of California Press. Bibcode:1979nmd..book.....M. Russian translation (1985), MIR Publishers.
- Mader, C. L.; Neal, T. R.; Dick, R. D. (1980). LASL Phermex Data, Volume I. University of California Press.
- Mader, C. L. (1980). LASL Phermex Data, Volume II. University of California Press.
- Mader, C. L. (1980). LASL Phermex Data, Volume III. University of California Press.
- Mader, C. L.; Johnson, J. N.; Crane, S. L. (1983). Los Alamos Explosives Performance Data. University of California Press.
- Mader, C. L. (2004). Numerical Modeling of Water Waves. CRC Press.
- Mader, C. L. (2007). Numerical Modeling of Explosives and Propellants. CRC Press.

=== Book chapters ===
- Mader, C. L. (1970). "Numerical Calculations of Explosive Phenomena", a chapter in Computers and Their Role in the Physical Sciences, edited by A. Taub and S. Fernbach. Gordon and Breach Science Publishers. pp. 385–404.
- Mader, C. L. (1990). "Chapter 10. Introduction to Energetic Materials", a chapter in High Velocity Impact Dynamics, edited by J. A. Zukas. Wiley-Interscience.
- Mader, C. L. (1990). "Chapter 13. Numerical Modeling of Impact Involving Energetic Materials", a chapter in High Velocity Impact Dynamics, edited by J. A. Zukas. Wiley-Interscience.
- Mader, C. L. (1996). "Chapter 3. Detonation Performance", a chapter in Organic Energetic Compounds, edited by P. L. Marinkas. Nova Science Publishers, Inc. pp. 165–247.
- Mader, C. L. (2001). "Tsunamis", a chapter in Encyclopedia of Global Environmental Change, edited by T. Munn. John Wiley and Sons.
- Mader, C. L. (2009). "Chapter 23. Numerical Modeling of Crater Formation by Meteorite Impact And Nuclear Explosion", a chapter in Predictive Modeling of Dynamic Process, Festschrift for Dr. Klaus Thoma, edited by S. Hiermaier. Springer. pp. 447–457.

=== Cited articles ===
- Mader, C. L.; Zinn, J. (1960). "Thermal initiation of explosives". Journal of Applied Physics. 31 (2): 323–328. Bibcode:1960JAP....31..323Z. doi:10.1063/1.1735565.
- Mader, C. L. (1963). "Detonation properties of condensed explosives computed using the Becker-Kistiakowsky-Wilson equation of state" (PDF). Los Alamos Scientific Laboratory Technical Report LA-2900.
- Mader, C. L. (1974). "Numerical simulation of tsunamis". Journal of Physical Oceanography. 4 (1): 74–82. Bibcode:1974JPO.....4...74M. doi:10.1175/1520-0485(1974)004<0074:NSOT>2.0.CO;2.
- Mader, C. L.; Gittings, M. L. (2002). "Modeling the 1958 Lituya Bay mega-tsunami, II". Science of Tsunami Hazards. 20 (5): 241–250.
- Mader, C. L.; Gittings, M. L. (2006). "Numerical model for the Krakatoa hydrovolcanic explosion and tsunami". Science of Tsunami Hazards. 24 (3): 174–182.

== Honors and awards ==
- Laboratory Fellow of Los Alamos National Laboratory (1982)
- Distinguished Performance Award, Los Alamos National Laboratory (1980)
- Fellow of American Institute of Chemists (1983)
- Award for Contributions to Tsunami Science, International Tsunami Society (2012)
- Sigma Xi (1954)
