= Túquerres =

Coordinates: 1°05′N 77°37′W

- Municipality and town
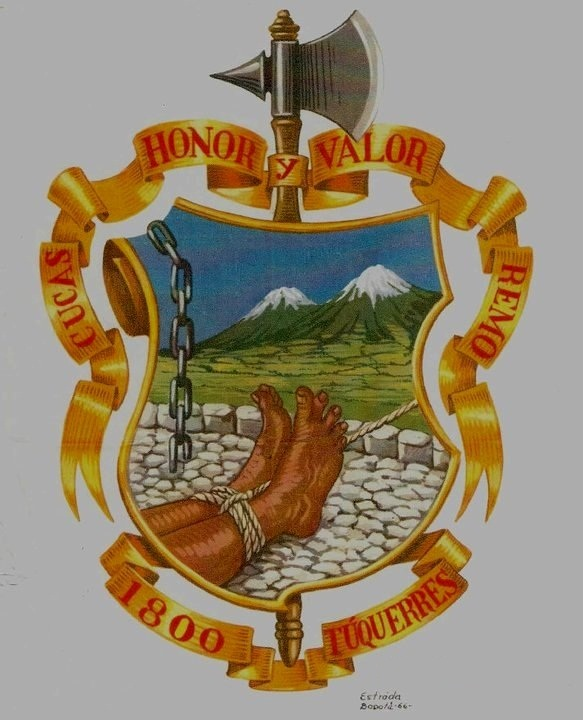
- Flag Coat of arms

- Location of the municipality and town of Tuquerres in the Nariño Department of Colombia.
- Country: Colombia
- Department: Nariño Department

Population (2020 est.)
  - Total: 40,038
- Time zone: UTC-5 (Colombia Standard Time)

Túquerres is a town and municipality in the Nariño Department, Colombia.

== Climate ==
Túquerres has a cold highland Mediterranean climate (Csb). It has moderate rainfall year-round.

Climate data for Túquerres (Paraiso El), elevation 3,120 m (10,240 ft), (1981–2010)
Month	Jan	Feb	Mar	Apr	May	Jun	Jul	Aug	Sep	Oct	Nov	Dec	Year
Mean daily maximum °C (°F)	15.8 (60.4)	15.7 (60.3)	15.8 (60.4)	15.9 (60.6)	15.7 (60.3)	15.2 (59.4)	14.7 (58.5)	14.8 (58.6)	15.5 (59.9)	15.9 (60.6)	15.9 (60.6)	15.8 (60.4)	15.6 (60.1)
Daily mean °C (°F)	11.1 (52.0)	11.1 (52.0)	11.2 (52.2)	11.4 (52.5)	11.4 (52.5)	10.9 (51.6)	10.2 (50.4)	10.3 (50.5)	10.7 (51.3)	11.1 (52.0)	11.1 (52.0)	11.1 (52.0)	11.0 (51.8)
Mean daily minimum °C (°F)	7.2 (45.0)	7.3 (45.1)	7.5 (45.5)	7.8 (46.0)	7.7 (45.9)	7.3 (45.1)	6.5 (43.7)	6.5 (43.7)	6.6 (43.9)	7.0 (44.6)	7.3 (45.1)	7.0 (44.6)	7.1 (44.8)
Average precipitation mm (inches)	77.0 (3.03)	79.6 (3.13)	101.6 (4.00)	133.7 (5.26)	108.4 (4.27)	55.0 (2.17)	34.7 (1.37)	28.3 (1.11)	54.9 (2.16)	115.6 (4.55)	114.2 (4.50)	101.8 (4.01)	1,004.7 (39.56)
Average precipitation days	16	16	19	21	19	14	11	10	12	19	19	19	196
Average relative humidity (%)	86	86	86	86	86	85	84	83	83	85	86	86	85
Mean monthly sunshine hours	114.7	90.3	86.8	87.0	105.4	120.0	136.4	130.2	111.0	111.6	108.0	117.8	1,319.2
Mean daily sunshine hours	3.7	3.2	2.8	2.9	3.4	4.0	4.4	4.2	3.7	3.6	3.6	3.8	3.6
Source: Instituto de Hidrologia Meteorologia y Estudios Ambientales
