= 2014 Palma Bay earthquake =

2014 Alaskan earthquake

- Location within Alaska
- UTC time: 2014-07-25 10:54:49
- ISC event: 606920342
- USGS-ANSS: ComCat
- Local date: July 25, 2014
- Local time: 02:54 ADT
- Magnitude: 6.0 M_{w}
- Epicenter: 58.31°N 136.96°E
- Type: Oblique-slip
- Areas affected: Alaska; United States
- Max. intensity: MMI IV (Light)

The 2014 Palma Bay earthquake occurred at 02:54 Alaska Daylight Time on July 25 in the northern southeastern panhandle of the U.S. state of Alaska. The earthquake registered 6.0 on the moment magnitude scale and had a maximum Mercalli intensity of IV (Light). It was centered on Palma Bay, 26 miles (42 km) from Elfin Cove and 94 miles (151 km) from the state capital of Juneau. Although there were no injuries or deaths, there were significant disruptions to Internet and telecommunications throughout Southeast Alaska, including to major telecom providers Alaska Communications Systems (ACS) and AT&T wireless, Internet and other communication systems.

== Earthquake ==
The earthquake struck along the strike-slip Queen Charlotte Fault, connecting Alaska's Aleutian Islands tectonic area with Southeast Alaska. The mainshock was preceded by less than one minute by a M5.4 foreshock in the immediate area. There were also a number of other M5 or higher events in the days leading up to the main event, but Alaska state seismologist Michael West stated that there was no evidence that they were related.

== Damage ==
The earthquake caused widespread outages to telecommunications in Southeast Alaska. Cellphone, Internet and other communications were disrupted for customers of ACS and AT&T throughout the day. Businesses in the area were unable to process credit card transactions, and many local websites were inaccessible. Outages were caused by damage to undersea fiber-optic cable serving the area. Other outages included the website of Alaska Electric Light & Power, the area's largest provider of electricity, although electrical service was not disrupted.

== See also ==
- List of earthquakes in 2014
- List of earthquakes in Alaska
- List of earthquakes in the United States
