= Maquinna (volcano) =

Active submarine volcano off the coast of British Columbia, Canada

- Summit depth: 2,500 m (8,202 ft)
- Height: ~30 m (98 ft)

Location
- Location: 16–18 km (9.9–11.2 mi) west of Vancouver Island
- Country: Canada

Geology
- Type: Mud volcano
- Age of rock: Holocene
- Last eruption: Holocene (active)

Maquinna is an active submarine mud volcano on the Coast of British Columbia, Canada, located 16–18 km (9.9–11.2 mi) west of Vancouver Island. It rises approximately 30 m (98 ft) above the mean level of the northeastern Pacific Ocean and lies directly along the southern expression of the left lateral, strike-slip Nootka Fault.

== Geology ==
Maquinna is one of the few mud volcanoes documented in the northeast Pacific. It is 1.5 km (1 mi) across, contains a breached caldera and two small summit craters.

Scientific studies of Maquinna showed strong, co-registered thermal, particulate, and unusual oxygen that extends 50 m (164 ft) above the volcano, indicating a water column. This data suggests the volcano is actively venting warm hydrothermal fluids.

The formation of Maquinna is thought to be high sediment accumulation and horizontal tectonic compression associated with accretionary prism formation adjacent to the west coast of Vancouver Island supporting overpressuring of fluids at depth along the Nootka Fault zone, resulting in the formation of Maquinna.

== See also ==
- Volcanism of Canada
- Volcanism of Western Canada
- List of volcanoes in Canada
