= Queen Charlotte triple junction =

Point where the Pacific plate, the North American plate, and the Explorer plate meet

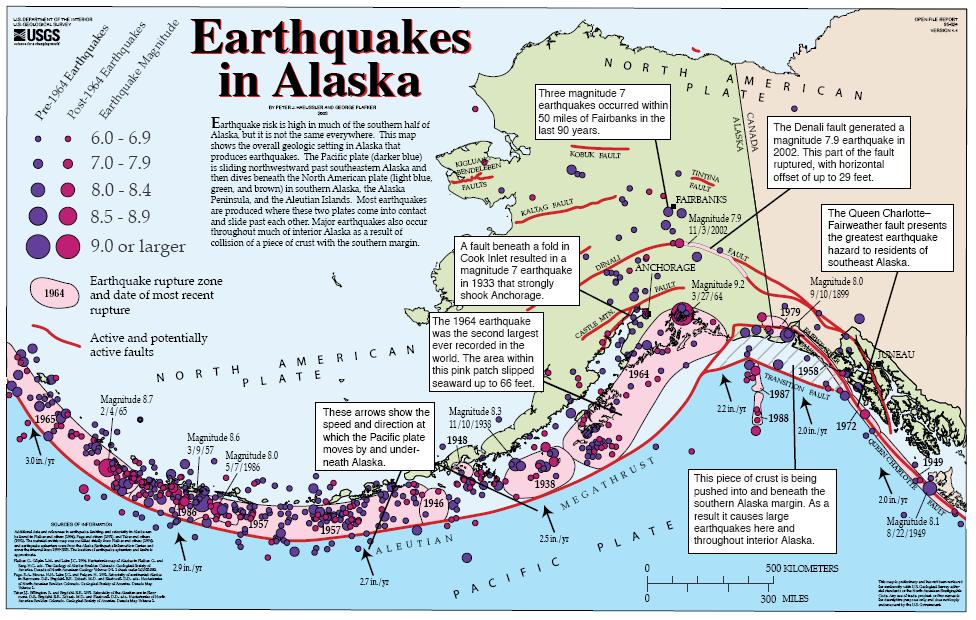
Tectonic map of Alaska and northwestern Canada showing main faults and historic earthquakes

The Queen Charlotte triple junction is a geologic triple junction where three tectonic plates meet: the Pacific plate, the North American plate, and the Explorer plate. The three plate boundaries which intersect here are the Queen Charlotte Fault, the northern Cascadia subduction zone, and the Explorer Ridge. The Queen Charlotte triple junction is currently positioned adjacent to the Queen Charlotte Sound near the Dellwood Knolls off the coast of Vancouver Island. 10 Ma to 1.5 Ma prior to the triple junction's current location, it was located southwest of Vancouver Island The movements of the triple junction have been characterized by two major shifts in the Pacific-North American Tertiary plate tectonic record. First, at approximately 40 Ma the relative plate motions switched from orthogonal convergence to right-lateral strike slip. The variance in location of the triple junction may have also been related to the formation of an independent basin block. This formation could have been produced by fore-arc bending of the Pacific plate, due to oblique underthrusting prior to 1 Ma which produced stresses sufficient to break the Pacific plate and isolate the block. Transpression of 15–30 mm/yr since 5 Ma has been taking place, as well as varying amounts of both transpression and transtension occurring before then. To the northwest of the triple junction the Pacific plate currently has 15 degrees of oblique convergence, passing under the North American plate along the Queen Charlotte transform fault zone. The Explorer plate is a small chunk of the Juan de Fuca plate that broke away from the Juan de Fuca plate about 3.5 Ma and has moved much slower with respect to North America.

== Plate kinematics and overview ==
The relative plate motions of this region have been difficult to determine due to the complicated nature of the Pacific, Juan de Fuca and Explorer plate triple junction vector triangle not being understood. The Juan de Fuca plate, created at the spreading ridge southwest of the triple junction, is moving at a rate of 45.7 mm/yr at an azimuth of 244˚ in relation to the North American plate, and the Pacific plate is moving at 58.6 mm/yr in relation to the Juan de Fuca plate. It has been proposed as well that the Explorer plate which makes up one of the three points of the junction is an ephemeral (short lived) plate that behaved independently for a brief period. Around 4 Ma it rapidly evolved and culminated as a new transform plate boundary. On the east it is becoming coupled with North America, while the western side becomes part of the Pacific plate. Earthquakes also occur due to the separating of the Pacific and North American plates along the Queen Charlotte Basin. Seismic recording studies have been made in the region with the two most active regions being the immediate area surrounding the Dellwood knolls and the Dellwood-Revere fracture zone (refer to fig.1). The magnitudes ranged from 0.2 to 3.2 in 76 events over the course of the 15-day study; however, magnitudes in the region have gone up to a magnitude 6.4 within the last 5 years. Using the locations of these epicentres it is possible to map the Pacific plate boundary along the Dellwood valley where the concentrations of events occur.

== Explorer plate ==
The Explorer ridge has been migrating since 5 Ma to the west at a rapid pace(~22 mm/yr), while the Juan de Fuca plate has remained stable. The migration was due to a combination of jumps, asymmetric spreading, and segment propagation. This model implies that the Queen Charlotte fault is lengthening to the south, while fragmenting the Explorer plate. Furthermore, this means that the Explorer plate is most likely being captured by the Pacific plate. However, the previously subducted parts will remain in place, coupled with the North American plate. A similar process to this is taking place in the Rivera triple junction where small ephemeral plates were also formed. The Explorer ridge is in the process of becoming extinct however, and high seismicity in the Explorer plate indicates that it is being severed by the establishment of this new simpler plate boundary configuration.

== Queen Charlotte Basin ==
The Queen Charlotte Basin was formed during the last 43 Ma by episodes of extension paired with a belt of subsidence and uplift. Periods of igneous activity in the Queen Charlotte Islands have corresponded with periods of extension. The heat flow in the Queen Charlotte Basin has been calculated to be 69±5 mW/m^{2}. To the southeast the heat flow is reduced through cooling by the subducting plate, and increased to the northwest through crustal extension.

There is much evidence for strike-slip in the Queen Charlotte Basin such as steeply dipping to vertical basins, deep and narrow asymmetric depocentres, upward branching complex fault patterns and contemporaneous normal and reverse faults within the same structure or local area. Longitudinal asymmetry is a classic indicator of strike-slip tectonics and can be observed at many scales in the Basin.
