= List of earthquakes in 1958 =

Earthquakes in 1958
Approximate epicenters of the earthquakes in 1958
- 4.0–5.9 magnitude
- 6.0–6.9 magnitude
- 7.0–7.9 magnitude
- 8.0+ magnitude
- Strongest magnitude: 8.3 M_{w} Soviet Union; 8.3 M_{w} United States
- Deadliest: Iran, Lorestan Province (Magnitude 6.7) August 16 132 deaths
- Total fatalities: 368

Number by magnitude
- 9.0+: 0
- 8.0–8.9: 2
- 7.0–7.9: 7
- 6.0–6.9: 102
- 5.0–5.9: 1

This is a list of earthquakes in 1958. Only magnitude 6.0 or greater earthquakes appear on the list. Lower magnitude events are included if they have caused death, injury or damage. Events that occurred in remote areas are excluded from the list unless they generated significant media interest. All dates are listed according to UTC time. Not the most active year with only 8 earthquakes reaching above magnitude 7.0. The largest event was a magnitude 8.3 earthquake in Russia in November, and another equally sized event in Alaska. Ecuador and Peru also saw fairly high activity. 1958 had only 368 deaths. Most of this total came from earthquakes in Iran and Ecuador.

== Overall ==
=== By death toll ===
Rank	Death toll	Magnitude	Location	MMI	Depth (km)	Date
1	132	6.7	Iran, Lorestan Province	VII (Very strong)	15.0	August 16
2	115	7.6	Ecuador, Esmeraldas Province	IX (Violent)	27.5	January 19
3	51	7.2	Japan, Ryukyu Islands	VI (Strong)	35.0	March 11
4	28	7.0	Peru, Arequipa Region	IX (Violent)	64.0	January 15
5	22	6.9	Ecuador, off the coast of Esmeraldas Province	X (Extreme)	15.0	February 1

- Note: At least 10 casualties

=== By magnitude ===
Rank	Magnitude	Death toll	Location	MMI	Depth (km)	Date
1	8.3	0	Soviet Union, Kuril Islands, Russia	X (Extreme)	35.0	November 6
1	8.3	5	United States, southeast Alaska	XI (Extreme)	10.0	July 10
3	7.6	115	Ecuador, Esmeraldas Province	IX (Violent)	27.5	January 19
4	7.5	0	Peru, Puno Region	III (Weak)	612.4	July 26
5	7.2	51	Japan, Ryukyu Islands	VI (Strong)	35.0	March 11
6	7.1	0	United States, central Alaska	VIII (Severe)	15.0	April 7
= 7	7.0	28	Peru, Arequipa Region	IX (Violent)	64.0	January 15
= 7	7.0	0	Soviet Union, Kuril Islands, Russia	V (Moderate)	35.0	November 12

- Note: At least 7.0 magnitude

== Notable events ==
=== January ===
January
- Strongest magnitude: 7.6 M_{w} Ecuador
- Deadliest: 7.6 M_{w} Ecuador; 115 deaths
- Total fatalities: 143

Number by magnitude
- 8.0–8.9: 0
- 7.0–7.9: 2
- 6.0–6.9: 9

Date	Country and location	M_{w}	Depth (km)	MMI	Notes	Casualties	
Date	Country and location	M_{w}	Depth (km)	MMI	Notes	Dead	Injured
13	United States, Rat Islands, Alaska	6.5	121.0				
15	Peru, Arequipa Region	7.0	64.0	IX	28 people were killed and some damage was caused.	28	
15	New Hebrides, Vanuatu	6.2	35.0				
19	Ecuador, Esmeraldas Province	7.6	27.5	IX	115 people were killed in the 1958 Ecuador-Colombia earthquake. 111 died in the earthquake and another 4 in a tsunami. 46 were injured and many homes were destroyed.	115	46
19	Ecuador, off the coast of Esmeraldas Province	6.8	27.5	VII	Aftershock.		
22	Taiwan, off the east coast of	6.0	25.0	VI			
23	Soviet Union, southern Kuril Islands, Russia	6.1	140.0				
24	Soviet Union, eastern Kamchatka, Russia	6.4	30.0	VI			
24	United States, Cook Inlet, Alaska	6.4	52.0	IV			
27	Tonga	6.1	35.0				
30	United Kingdom, Solomon Islands	6.3	30.0	VI			

=== February ===
February
- Strongest magnitude: 6.9 M_{w} Ecuador
- Deadliest: 6.9 M_{w} Ecuador; 22 deaths
- Total fatalities: 22

Number by magnitude
- 8.0–8.9: 0
- 7.0–7.9: 0
- 6.0–6.9: 12

Date	Country and location	M_{w}	Depth (km)	MMI	Notes	Casualties	
Date	Country and location	M_{w}	Depth (km)	MMI	Notes	Dead	Injured
1	Ecuador, off the coast of Esmeraldas Province	6.9	15.0	X	22 people were killed and major damage was caused in this large aftershock of the 1958 Ecuador-Colombia earthquake.	22	
1	Ecuador, off the coast of Esmeraldas Province	6.3	25.0	VI	Aftershock.		
1	Ecuador, off the coast of Esmeraldas Province	6.3	25.0	VI	Aftershock.		
7	China, Sichuan Province	6.0	25.0	VII	Some homes were destroyed.		
9	Philippines, off the west coast of Mindoro	6.0	20.0	VI			
12	United States, Andreanof Islands, Alaska	6.0	40.1				
15	Soviet Union, Kuril Islands, Russia	6.0	35.0				
16	Japan, off the east coast of Honshu	6.1	35.0	IV			
17	Afghanistan, Badakhshan Province	6.6	200.3				
19	Indonesia, off the south coast of Java	6.0	35.0	V			
23	Japan, Bonin Islands	6.5	410.0				
24	Mongolia, Bayankhongor Province	6.2	15.0	VII			

=== March ===
March
- Strongest magnitude: 7.2 M_{w} Japan
- Deadliest: 7.2 M_{w} Japan; 51+ deaths
- Total fatalities: 51+

Number by magnitude
- 8.0–8.9: 0
- 7.0–7.9: 1
- 6.0–6.9: 4

Date	Country and location	M_{w}	Depth (km)	MMI	Notes	Casualties	
Date	Country and location	M_{w}	Depth (km)	MMI	Notes	Dead	Injured
11	Japan, Ryukyu Islands	7.2	35.0	VI	At least 51 people were killed and 101 were injured.	51+	101+
15	Taiwan, off the east coast of	6.2	20.0	V			
22	Burma, Chin State	6.0	50.0	V			
22	Afghanistan, Baghlan Province	6.1	35.0	VI			
28	Afghanistan, Badakhshan Province	6.6	184.4				

=== April ===
April
- Strongest magnitude: 7.1 M_{w} United States
- Total fatalities: 0

Number by magnitude
- 8.0–8.9: 0
- 7.0–7.9: 1
- 6.0–6.9: 15

Date	Country and location	M_{w}	Depth (km)	MMI	Notes	Casualties	
Date	Country and location	M_{w}	Depth (km)	MMI	Notes	Dead	Injured
4	Australia, off the southeast coast of New Britain, Papua and New Guinea	6.2	35.0	VI			
7	United States, central Alaska	7.1	15.0	VIII	Some damage was caused by the 1958 Huslia earthquake.		
7	Japan, off the east coast of Honshu	6.8	10.0				
7	Japan, off the east coast of Honshu	6.5	15.0		Aftershock.		
7	Mongolia, Bayankhongor Province	6.9	30.0	VII			
11	Soviet Union, Kuril Islands, Russia	6.5	137.9				
12	Mexico, Gulf of California	6.3	15.0	V			
12	Japan, Ryukyu Islands	6.0	35.0				
14	Ecuador, Esmeraldas Province	6.8	25.0	VII			
14	Ecuador, Esmeraldas Province	6.6	25.0		Aftershock.		
15	Ecuador, Esmeraldas Province	6.1	25.0	VI	Aftershock.		
17	Australia, East New Britain Province, Papua and New Guinea	6.1	35.0	V			
21	Indonesia, southern Sumatra	6.5	180.6				
28	Peru, Junin Region	6.3	35.0	VII			
30	Afghanistan, Badakhshan Province	6.0	185.0				
30	Chile, Antofagasta Region	6.0	113.4				

=== May ===
May
- Strongest magnitude: 6.9 M_{w} New Hebrides
- Total fatalities: 0

Number by magnitude
- 8.0–8.9: 0
- 7.0–7.9: 0
- 6.0–6.9: 11

Date	Country and location	M_{w}	Depth (km)	MMI	Notes	Casualties	
Date	Country and location	M_{w}	Depth (km)	MMI	Notes	Dead	Injured
1	New Hebrides, Vanuatu	6.2	210.0				
8	Argentina, Salta Province	6.4	180.6				
9	Argentina, Cordoba Province, Argentina	6.6	200.0	rowspan="2"| Doublet earthquake.			
9	Argentina, Cordoba Province, Argentina	6.8	185.7				
12	United States, Fox Islands (Alaska)	6.4	25.0				
18	New Hebrides, Vanuatu	6.3	45.0	rowspan="2"| Doublet earthquake.			
18	New Hebrides, Vanuatu	6.2	45.0	V			
25	Peru, Amazonas Region	6.2	45.8	VI			
26	United States, Fox Islands (Alaska)	6.1	130.0				
30	United States, Fox Islands (Alaska)	6.1	130.0				
31	New Hebrides, Vanuatu	6.9	35.0	VI			

=== June ===
June
- Strongest magnitude: 6.8 M_{w} Australia
- Total fatalities: 0

Number by magnitude
- 8.0–8.9: 0
- 7.0–7.9: 0
- 6.0–6.9: 7

Date	Country and location	M_{w}	Depth (km)	MMI	Notes	Casualties	
Date	Country and location	M_{w}	Depth (km)	MMI	Notes	Dead	Injured
3	New Hebrides, Vanuatu	6.2	20.0	VI	Aftershock.		
19	Soviet Union, Kuril Islands, Russia	6.2	50.0				
23	Mongolia, Bulgan Province	6.1	15.0	VII			
25	Australia, off the north coast of Papua and New Guinea	6.8	30.0	V			
26	Soviet Union, eastern Kamchatka	6.6	125.9				
29	Peru, Arequipa Region	6.5	161.9				
30	Greece, Dodecanese Islands	6.2	109.4				

=== July ===
July
- Strongest magnitude: 7.8 M_{w} United States
- Deadliest: 7.8 M_{w} United States; 5 deaths
- Total fatalities: 5

Number by magnitude
- 8.0–8.9: 0
- 7.0–7.9: 2
- 6.0–6.9: 8

Date	Country and location	M_{w}	Depth (km)	MMI	Notes	Casualties	
Date	Country and location	M_{w}	Depth (km)	MMI	Notes	Dead	Injured
1	United States, Andreanof Islands, Alaska	6.0	25.0				
4	Philippines, south of Mindanao	6.0	55.0	V			
10	United States, southeast Alaska	7.8	10.0	XI	5 people were killed in the 1958 Lituya Bay, Alaska earthquake and megatsunami. Some homes were destroyed with costs being around $100,000 (1958 rate).	5	
11	Chile, Tarapaca Region	6.0	55.0	VI			
16	United Kingdom, Masvingo Province, Rhodesia and Nyasaland	6.0	0.0		Unknown depth.		
19	Indonesia, Papua (province)	6.5	158.3				
19	Indonesia, Halmahera Sea	6.5	45.0	VI			
21	Soviet Union, Kuril Islands, Russia	6.2	45.0				
26	Peru, Puno Region	7.5	612.4	III	Some damage was caused.		
30	Indonesia, Papua (province)	6.0	100.0				

=== August ===
August
- Strongest magnitude: 6.9 M_{w} Indonesia
- Deadliest: 6.7 M_{w} Iran; 132 deaths
- Total fatalities: 132

Number by magnitude
- 8.0–8.9: 0
- 7.0–7.9: 0
- 6.0–6.9: 11

Date	Country and location	M_{w}	Depth (km)	MMI	Notes	Casualties	
Date	Country and location	M_{w}	Depth (km)	MMI	Notes	Dead	Injured
4	Indonesia, Banda Sea	6.4	147.2				
6	Samoa	6.2	25.0				
12	Indonesia, Molucca Sea	6.5	47.5				
14	United States, Andreanof Islands, Alaska	6.3	35.0				
15	Soviet Union, eastern Kamchatka	6.8	43.0	VI			
15	Indonesia, Minahassa Peninsula	6.9	177.7				
16	United States, Andreanof Islands, Alaska	6.1	25.0				
16	Iran, Lorestan Province	6.7	15.0	VII	Main article: 1958 Firuzabad earthquake	132	
20	New Hebrides, Vanuatu	6.3	25.0				
27	Greece, Ionian Sea	6.3	15.0	VI			
30	Mexico, Gulf of California	6.0	15.0				

=== September ===
September
- Strongest magnitude: 6.8 M_{w} Chile
- Deadliest: 6.8 M_{w} Chile; 7 deaths
- Total fatalities: 7

Number by magnitude
- 8.0–8.9: 0
- 7.0–7.9: 0
- 6.0–6.9: 6
- 5.0–5.9: 1

Date	Country and location	M_{w}	Depth (km)	MMI	Notes	Casualties	
Date	Country and location	M_{w}	Depth (km)	MMI	Notes	Dead	Injured
3	Mexico, off the coast of Chiapas	6.2	100.0				
4	Chile, Santiago Metropolitan Region	6.8	15.0	VI	7 people were killed and major damage was caused.	7	
11	Philippines, off the east coast of Mindanao	6.0	35.0	VI			
14	Soviet Union, Amur Oblast, Russia	6.5	15.0	VII			
18	Afghanistan, Badakhshan Province	6.1	150.0				
20	Australia, off the west coast of Bougainville Island, Papua and New Guinea	6.2	35.0	VI			
25	China, Guangxi Province	5.8	0.0	VII	Some homes were destroyed. Unknown depth.		

=== October ===
October
- Strongest magnitude: 6.8 M_{w} Japan
- Deadliest: 6.0 M_{w} Indonesia; 8 deaths
- Total fatalities: 8

Number by magnitude
- 8.0–8.9: 0
- 7.0–7.9: 0
- 6.0–6.9: 7

Date	Country and location	M_{w}	Depth (km)	MMI	Notes	Casualties	
Date	Country and location	M_{w}	Depth (km)	MMI	Notes	Dead	Injured
7	Australia, East New Britain Province, Papua and New Guinea	6.3	35.0	VI			
11	Argentina, Jujuy Province	6.0	220.0				
12	Japan, west of the Ryukyu Islands	6.8	256.7				
20	Indonesia, south of Java	6.0	55.0	VIII	8 people were killed and another 1,856 were injured. 95 homes were destroyed and another 206 were damaged.	8	1,856
21	Australia, off the east coast of mainland Papua and New Guinea	6.5	170.0				
28	China, western Xizang Province	6.3	15.0	VII			
29	United States, Rat Islands, Alaska	6.6	30.0				

=== November ===
November
- Strongest magnitude: 8.3 M_{w} Soviet Union
- Total fatalities: 0

Number by magnitude
- 8.0–8.9: 1
- 7.0–7.9: 1
- 6.0–6.9: 5

Date	Country and location	M_{w}	Depth (km)	MMI	Notes	Casualties	
Date	Country and location	M_{w}	Depth (km)	MMI	Notes	Dead	Injured
1	Australia, west of New Ireland (island), Papua and New Guinea	6.3	15.0				
1	New Hebrides, Vanuatu	6.2	25.0	VI			
6	Soviet Union, Kuril Islands, Russia	8.3	35.0	X	At least 51 people were injured in the 1958 Kuril Islands earthquake. Some damage was caused.		51+
12	Soviet Union, Kuril Islands, Russia	7.0	35.0	V	Aftershock.		
13	Soviet Union, Kuril Islands, Russia	6.1	45.0		Aftershock.		
14	Indonesia, Tanimbar Islands	6.4	88.6				
15	Soviet Union, Kuril Islands, Russia	6.6	84.6		Aftershock.		

=== December ===
December
- Strongest magnitude: 6.6 M_{w} New Zealand
- Total fatalities: 0

Number by magnitude
- 8.0–8.9: 0
- 7.0–7.9: 0
- 6.0–6.9: 7

Date	Country and location	M_{w}	Depth (km)	MMI	Notes	Casualties	
Date	Country and location	M_{w}	Depth (km)	MMI	Notes	Dead	Injured
3	Philippines, Babuyan Islands	6.1	30.0	VI			
10	Afghanistan, Badakhshan Province	6.2	96.6				
10	New Zealand, off the north coast of North Island	6.6	290.8				
10	Mexico, Gulf of California	6.1	15.0				
21	China, Xinjiang Province	6.4	20.0	VII			
25	Australia, East New Britain Province, Papua and New Guinea	6.2	38.9	V			
28	India, Uttaranchal	6.1	15.0	VI			
