= Queen Charlotte Fault =

Active transform fault in Canada and Alaska

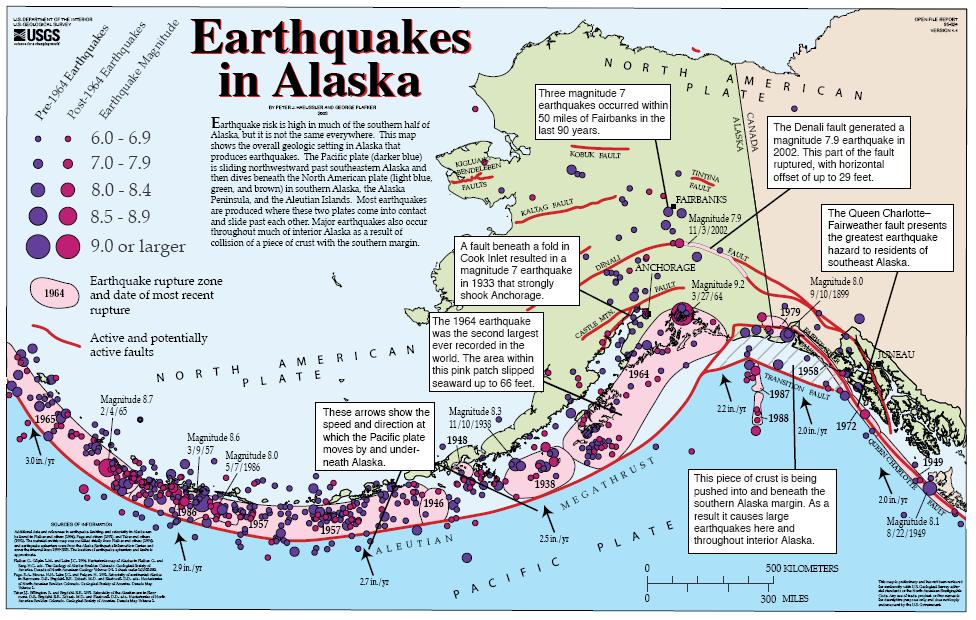
Tectonic map of Alaska and northwestern Canada showing main faults and historic earthquakes

The Queen Charlotte Fault is an active transform fault on the boundary between the North American plate and Pacific plates. It is Canada's right-lateral strike-slip equivalent to the San Andreas Fault to the south in California. The Queen Charlotte Fault forms a triple junction at its southern with the Cascadia subduction zone and the Explorer Ridge (the Queen Charlotte triple junction). The Queen Charlotte Fault (QCF) forms a transpressional plate boundary, and is as active as other major transform fault systems (such as San Andreas or Alpine) in terms of slip rates and seismogenic potential. It sustains the highest-known deformation rates among continental or continent-ocean transform systems globally, accommodating more than 50 mm/yr of dextral offset. The entire 900-kilometre (560 mi) offshore length has ruptured in seven magnitude 7+ events during the last century, making the cumulative historical seismic moment release higher than any other modern transform plate boundary system.

The fault is named for the Queen Charlotte Islands (now Haida Gwaii), which lie just north of the triple junction. The Queen Charlotte Fault continues northward along the Alaskan coast, where it is called the Fairweather Fault. The two segments are collectively called the Queen Charlotte-Fairweather Fault System.

== Fault orientation and plate motion ==
The junction of the Queen Charlotte, Fairweather, and Transition faults is located at the southeastern tip of the Yakutat block, an oceanic plateau and microplate. The southern boundary of the QCF is marked by the complex Pacific–North American–Explorer triple junction off the coast of southern British Columbia. The Queen Charlotte Fault continues northward along the Alaskan coast, where it is called the Fairweather Fault. The two segments are collectively called the Queen Charlotte-Fairweather Fault System. The current state of transpressive plate boundary systems results from spatial and temporal changes between both rheologic and kinematic parameters. From north to south, there is a decreasing rate of convergence and change in fault obliquity which appears to divide the fault into at least three distinct kinematic zones along strike with associated changes in seafloor morphology, fault structure, and seismicity. The northern, central, and southern segments with maximum obliquity (approximately 15°–20°) occur south of 53.2°N, and minimum obliquity (less than 5°) occurs north of 56°N. Existing geophysical data suggest abrupt transitions in deformation mechanisms and plate boundary dynamics across these boundaries with incipient underthrusting and strain partitioning in the south along Haida Gwaii, distributed transpression in the central segment, and highly localized strike-slip deformation in the north. There are various mechanisms proposed to accommodate oblique convergence along the QCF, including underthrusting, strain partitioning, crustal thickening, and distributed shear. Through geologic time, a change in Pacific plate motion beginning as recently as approximately 6 Ma or as early as approximately 12 Ma caused an increase in convergence along the entire length of the fault and initiated underthrusting along the southern segment where convergence is highest, a process that ultimately led to the 2012 Haida Gwaii thrust earthquake.

== Crustal deformation along strike ==
=== Southern segment ===
Crustal deformation via strain partitioning likely dominates the southern segment, as evidenced by the thrust mechanism of the 2012 Haida Gwaii earthquake, where geoscientists observed downwarping and normal faulting on the Pacific plate west of Haida Gwaii. This hypothesis is also supported by the morphology of the Queen Charlotte Terrace, a 30-kilometre-wide (19 mi) deformed accretionary-prism-like complex west of the main QCF trace. Several recent studies based on seismicity, GPS observations of coseismic and postseismic deformation, and thermal modeling support the presence of a shallow plate boundary thrust.

=== Central segment ===
In the central segment, abrupt changes in both seafloor morphology and structural geometry accompany a decrease in convergence angle. The Queen Charlotte Terrace widens and deepens, forming a series of oblique ridges and basins west of the QCF main trace. There is a distinct structural transition due to a change in the stress regime from pure shear in the southern QCF segment to simple shear in the central QCF segment as a result of convergence decreasing below a critical angle of approximately 15°.

=== Northern segment ===
In the northern segment, which bore the epicenter of the strike-slip 2013 Craig earthquake, bathymetric data suggests that the ridge-basin complex gives way to simpler fault morphology. Deformation largely occurs on what appears to be a single strike-slip structure. The same location also marks earthquake rupture boundaries between the 2013 Craig event and the 1972 M7.6 Sitka event, as well as the inferred intersection of the Chatham Strait Fault and the Aja Fracture Zone (FZ) with the Queen Charlotte Fault; the Aja FZ also marks a 3-million-year contrast in Pacific plate crustal age. Accommodation of strike-slip plate motion along a narrow deformation zone is consistent with focal mechanisms determined for the Craig event and its aftershocks. Combined with other observations along the fault, this behavior implies that there may be a critical angle of obliquity within the simple shear regime at which distributed shear across multiple structures is not sustainable, and deformation can be more easily accommodated on a single structure. The fault has been the source of large, very large, and great earthquakes.

== Significant earthquakes along the fault ==
Date	M	Damage	Article
1929	~7
1949	8.1	Landslides, housing and infrastructure damage, oil tank collapse	1949 Queen Charlotte Islands earthquake
1958	7.8	Landslide, megatsunami (524 m), housing and infrastructure destruction, 5 casualties	1958 Lituya Bay earthquake and megatsunami
1970	7.4	Landslides
1990	5.3	Minor
2001	6.3	Minor
2004	6.8	Land slippage
2008	6.5	Minor
2009	6.6	Minor
2012	7.8	Temporary desiccation of hot springs, 1 casualty (indirect)	2012 Haida Gwaii earthquake
2013	7.6	Minor	2013 Craig, Alaska earthquake
2014	6.0	Undersea fiber-optic cable damage, causing widespread telecommunications outages	2014 Palma Bay earthquake
2025	7.0	Minor; Some landslides

Six large earthquakes have occurred along the Queen Charlotte Fault within the last hundred years: a magnitude 7 event in 1929, a magnitude 8.1 in 1949 (Canada's largest recorded earthquake since the 1700 Cascadia earthquake), a magnitude 7.8 in 1958, a magnitude 7.4 in 1970, a magnitude 7.8 in 2012, and a magnitude 7.6 in 2013.

The P nodal focal mechanism for the 1949 earthquake indicates a virtually pure strike-slip movement with a northwest-striking nodal plane corresponding to the strike of the fault. This is similar to the 1970 earthquake, which also showed a strike-slip movement with a small but significant thrust component, consistent with relative plate motion. The 1949 earthquake was larger than the 1906 San Francisco earthquake, causing a nearly 500-kilometre-long (310 mi) segment of the Queen Charlotte Fault to break.

The 1958 earthquake had a magnitude of 7.8 and led to a major landslide in Lituya Bay, Alaska. This resulted in a 1,720-foot (520-metre) tsunami that crashed into a mountainside, the largest tsunami run-up ever recorded.

The 2012 magnitude 7.8 earthquake struck off the western coast of Haida Gwaii at around 8:10pm Pacific Time on Saturday, 27 October. This was the biggest quake in Canadian territory since 1949. Aftershocks as large as magnitude 6.3 were reported. A 45-centimetre (18 in) tsunami was reported locally. Alerts were sent across the Pacific Basin. This earthquake did not have any major impacts, except for the temporary desiccation of the hot springs on Hotspring Island. The springs seemed to have returned to borderline-normal functioning as of July 2014.

The 2012 quake was remarkable for having been a thrust, rather than strike-slip, tremor, more like the mechanism of the Cascadia subduction zone to the south. Recent detailed seafloor mapping has revealed the expression of the Queen Charlotte Fault on the seafloor, including the truncation of submarine canyons that occur along the continental slope.

== See also ==
- List of earthquakes in Canada
- Queen Charlotte Sound
- Ring of Fire
