= Explorer Ridge =

Mid-ocean ridge west of British Columbia, Canada

Coordinates: 49.6667°N 130.3333°W

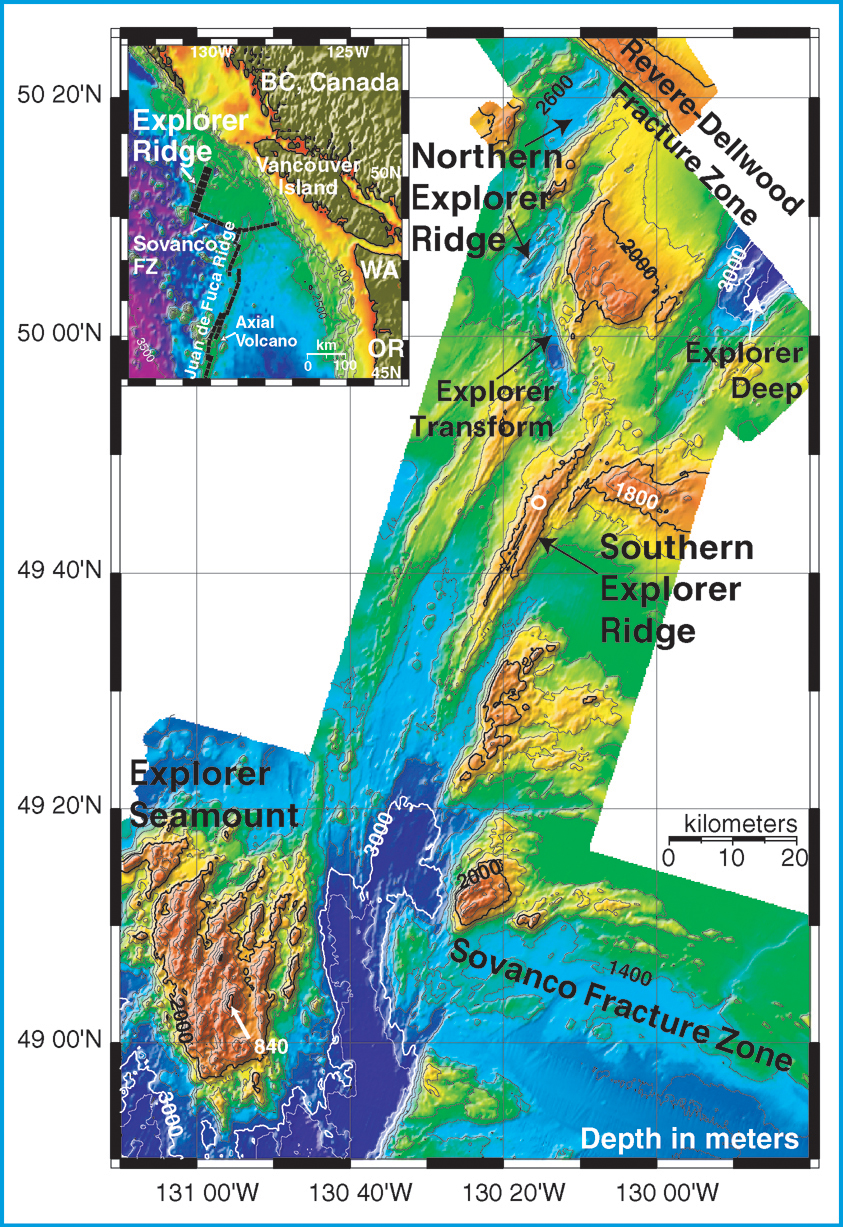
Bathymetry of Explorer Ridge area, collected between 1980 and 1984. Bathymetry is contoured at a 200-meter interval. The inset shows the ridge location. The open white circle represents the approximately location of the Magic Mountain vent site.

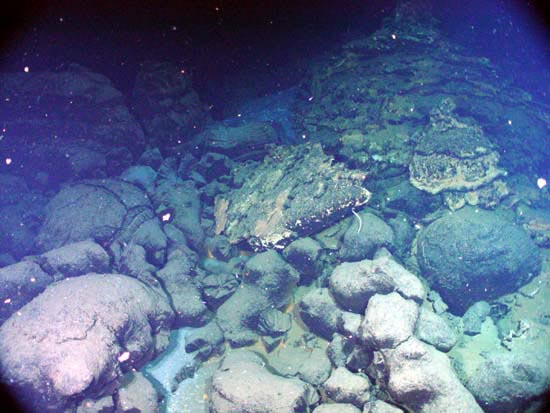
Pillow lavas and breccia overlain with slabby pieces of sulfide formed from hydrothermal venting on the east side of the Southern Explorer Ridge.

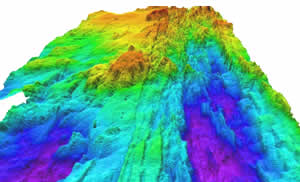
Bathymetry image showing the crest of Southern Explorer Ridge. Purple and dark blue colors indicate deepest depths.

The Explorer Ridge is a mid-ocean ridge, a divergent tectonic plate boundary located about 241 km (150 mi) west of Vancouver Island, British Columbia, Canada. It lies at the northern extremity of the Pacific spreading axis. To its east is the Explorer plate, which together with the Juan de Fuca plate and the Gorda plate to its south, is what remains of the once-vast Farallon plate which has been largely subducted under the North American plate. The Explorer Ridge consists of one major segment, the Southern Explorer Ridge, and several smaller segments. It runs northward from the Sovanco fracture zone to the Queen Charlotte triple junction, a point where it meets the Queen Charlotte Fault and the northern Cascadia subduction zone.

== Geology ==
This divergent boundary first formed about 5–7 million years ago when the northern end of the Juan de Fuca plate broke off along the Nootka Fault to form the Explorer plate. This apparently had some important ramifications for regional geologic evolution. When this change was completed, Cascade Arc volcanism from Northern California to southwestern British Columbia returned and the present-day Cascade Range and Olympic Mountains started to form.

The oceanic crust is moving away from the Explorer Ridge to either side. On the eastern side the eastward moving Explorer plate is being subducted under the North American plate. The belt of volcanoes along the Pacific Ranges are the direct results of this collision. The western side of the Explorer Ridge is associated with the northwest trending Pacific plate which has formed the Queen Charlotte Fault, an active transform fault along the coast of British Columbia and southeast Alaska.

The Explorer Ridge is also seismically active. Most seismicity recorded in this area occurred on or near the Explorer Transform Fault Zone. The relatively shallow depth of the Southern Explorer Ridge (up to 1800 m) in comparison with most other segments of the northeast Pacific spreading centers suggests that there has been considerable volcanic activity along this segment in the past 100,000 years.

== Notable features along the ridge ==
The Explorer Ridge includes a deep rift valley which runs along the axis of the ridge along nearly its entire length. This rift marks the actual boundary between adjacent tectonic plates, where magma from the mantle reaches the seafloor, erupting as lava and producing new crustal material for the plates.

Before 2002 Explorer Ridge was the least explored of the northeast Pacific spreading centers, even though it was known to have robust hydrothermal activity and is seismically active. Along the Southern Explorer Ridge lies a large hydrothermal vent area called Magic Mountain. It is an unusual hydrothermal site, with its off-axis location and relatively long-lived activity. The source of the hydrothermal fluid that fuels Magic Mountain probably rises along fault systems associated with a recent episode of rifting that, in turn, followed a massive outpouring of lava. These vents are forming seafloor massive sulfide deposits on the ocean floor. Many strange deep-water creatures have been found here.

== See also ==
- Geology of the Pacific Northwest
- Gorda Ridge
- Juan de Fuca Ridge
- Sovanco fracture zone
- Volcanism of Canada
