= Magic Mountain (British Columbia) =

Hydrothermal vent field in the northeast Pacific

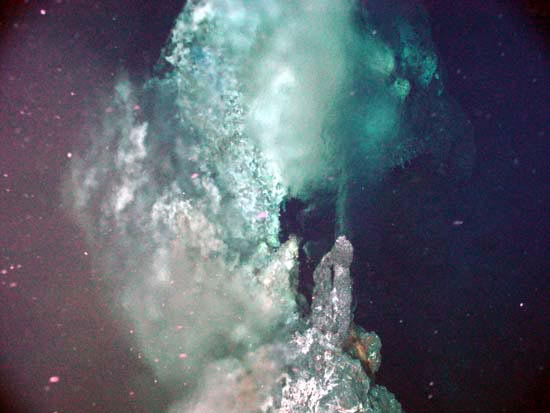
Sulfide chimney of Magic Mountain

Magic Mountain is a large long-lived hydrothermal vent field on the Southern Explorer Ridge, located about 150 miles west of Vancouver Island, British Columbia, Canada. Unlike most hydrothermal systems found in the Pacific Ocean, Magic Mountain is situated outside the Explorer Ridge. Its source is believed to rise along fault systems.

== See also ==
- Volcanism of Canada – Volcanic activity in Canada
- Volcanism of Western Canada
