= 2012 Haida Gwaii earthquake =

Earthquake in Canada

- Location within British Columbia
- UTC time: 2012-10-28 03:04:09
- ISC event: 603860908
- USGS-ANSS: ComCat
- Local date: October 27, 2012
- Local time: 20:04:09 (PDT)
- Duration: 90 seconds
- Magnitude: 7.8 M_{w}
- Depth: 17.5 km (10.9 mi)
- Epicenter: 52.769°N 131.927°W
- Type: Thrust
- Areas affected: Canada
- Max. intensity: MMI V (Moderate)
- Peak acceleration: 0.2 g
- Tsunami: 13 m (43 ft)
- Casualties: 1 dead (indirect)

The 2012 Haida Gwaii earthquake occurred just after 8:04 p.m. PDT on October 27. The shock had a moment magnitude of 7.8 and a maximum Mercalli Intensity of V (Moderate). The earthquake's epicentre was on Moresby Island of the Haida Gwaii archipelago (formerly known as the Queen Charlotte Islands). This was the second largest Canadian earthquake ever recorded by a seismometer, after the 1949 Queen Charlotte Islands earthquake, about 135 kilometres (84 mi) away. One person died due to a car crash related to the tsunami in Oahu, Hawaii.

== Earthquake ==
Strong shaking was felt throughout Haida Gwaii where residents in Masset, Skidegate, Sandspit, and Queen Charlotte City were evacuated to higher ground. Minor shaking was felt in Prince Rupert and in other cities of the Interior such as Prince George, Quesnel, and as far away as Kamloops. Electricity service was interrupted in Bella Coola.

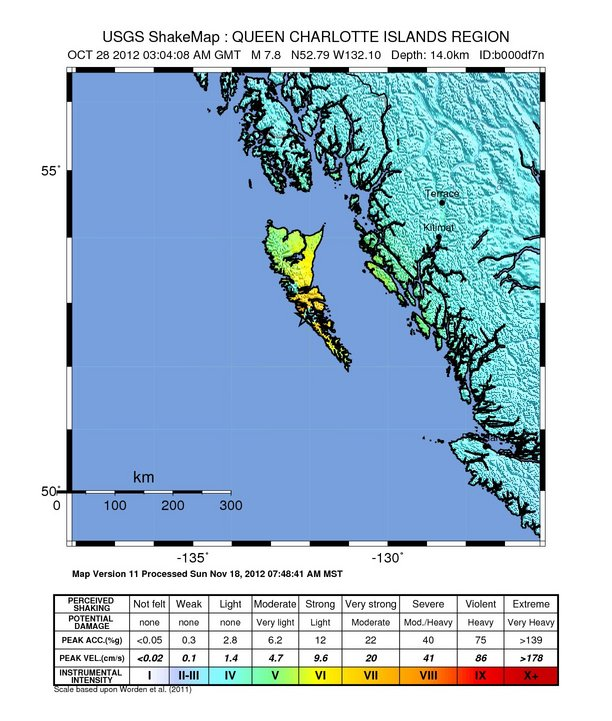
USGS ShakeMap for the event

Although the earthquake occurred on the Queen Charlotte Fault, a primarily strike-slip boundary between the Pacific plate and North American plate where the Pacific plate moves approximately north-northwest with respect to the North America plate at a rate of about 50 mm/yr, the 2012 quake exhibited a thrust mechanism, more characteristic of the Cascadia subduction zone to the south.

== Tsunami ==
A tsunami warning was issued for the North American Coast from the Alaskan Panhandle to Vancouver Island, but later limited to the North Coast region of British Columbia. Canadian authorities were questioned for issuing a tsunami warning nearly 40 minutes after the U.S. had issued their warning. The greatest wave heights recorded at tide gauges in Canada were 25 cm (9.8 in) at Langara Island and 22 cm (8.7 in) at Winter Harbour. In Tofino on Vancouver Island, the tsunami warning sirens were activated and residents in low-lying areas evacuated their homes. The maximum wave height recorded in Tofino was 9 cm (3.5 in). Tofino's tsunami warning system was activated after communication with the provincial coordinating centre was cut off.

In the U.S., Hawaii was also placed on alert, and over 100,000 people were evacuated to higher ground. The maximum wave height recorded at tide gauges in Hawaii was 79 cm (31 in). Other warnings were issued for the states of Oregon and California, but were subsequently lifted. Along the western coast of Haida Gwaii, the earthquake triggered tsunami waves with a maximum run-up height at 13 meters in Davidson Inlet. In Mike Inlet, the tsunami was measured at 7.6 meters, making it the largest tsunami generated by an earthquake in western Canadian history.

=== Damage ===
Despite the earthquake's large magnitude, no major structural damage was reported from any of the population centres in the vicinity. This can be explained by the remoteness of the tremor's epicentre. No casualties or major injuries were recorded from the quake, likely due to the sparsely populated nature of the region, but in Hawaii, one person died in a car crash near a road that was closed because of the tsunami threat near Oahu's northern coast. As a result of the earthquake and its aftershocks, the famed hot springs in Gwaii Haanas National Park on Hotspring Island dried up. In 2015 the hot springs began to come back.

=== Aftershocks ===
There were 94 aftershocks of magnitude 4.0 or greater lasting until November 7, as recorded by the USGS.

The largest of these numerous aftershocks was a 6.3 magnitude earthquake that occurred 36 kilometres (22 mi) to the west of the main tremor on the morning of October 28. This was followed on October 29 by a 6.2 aftershock 50 kilometres (31 mi) to the south of the original quake.

Four months after the mainshock, in January 2013, another magnitude 7.5 earthquake struck north of Haida Gwaii in southeastern Alaska. The earthquake had a pure strike-slip focal mechanism, consistent with a rupture along the Queen Charlotte Fault. This earthquake is not considered an aftershock, but was triggered by stress transfer caused by the October 2012 earthquake.

== See also ==
- List of earthquakes in 2012
- List of earthquakes in Canada
