= Yakutat Block =

Earth crust fragment in Alaska

Coordinates: 59.6751°N 141.7057°W

The Yakutat Block is a terrane in the process of accreting to the North American continent along the south-central coast of Alaska. It has been displaced about 600 km (370 mi) northward since the Cenozoic along the Queen Charlotte-Fairweather fault system. The block subducts between this fault system and the Alaska-Aleutian Subduction Zone. The thickness of the Yakutat Block varies, ranging from approximately 15 km in the west to 30 km in the east.

The Yakutat Block is bounded on the northeast by the Fairweather Fault, and on the north by a system of thrust and possibly strike-slip faults in the Chugach Mountains and Saint Elias Mountains. The Yakutat Block is bounded on its southwest side by an as yet undefined underwater geologic feature known as the Transition Zone. Global Positioning System (GPS) measurements indicate that the Yakutat block has a distinctive velocity relative to both the Pacific Plate and the North American Plate. Thus it appears to be a terrane in the process of accreting rather than a block already sutured on to the Pacific or North American plate.

The observed offshore seismic structure of the block resembles that of an oceanic plateau. The western part of the block subducts with the Pacific Plate at a very low angle, exhibiting buoyancy caused by its composition.

A few deep earthquakes have been recorded in the Wrangell volcanic region, which lies approximately above the subducted region of the block. This seismic activity has led some geologists to believe that there is a block or plate fragment that has torn off in the subsurface here, but analysis of S and P wave velocities has led others to argue against this theory. The most current studies propose that there is a subducting material here, but that it is likely connected to the Yakutat Block.

Relative to North America, the Yakutat Block moves at a rate of about 45 mm per year (1.8 in) to the north northwest, along the Fairweather fault. There is about 20 mm per year (0.79 in) of contraction between the Yakutat block and the Pacific plate, which is probably accommodated on an offshore structure. South of Yakutat Bay, the boundary between the Yakutat block and the North American plate is once again along the Fairweather Fault. North of Yakutat Bay, between Yakutat Bay and the Copper River/Wrangell Mountains region, about 40 mm per year (1.6 in) of contraction is taken up by compression, accommodated by faults within the continental crust. The convergence rate is among the highest in the world within continental crust, surpassing even that which is occurring between the Indo-Australian Plate and the Eurasian Plate which is lifting the Himalayas.
