= 1958 Lituya Bay earthquake and megatsunami =

Geologic events off the Alaska coast

1958 Lituya Bay earthquake
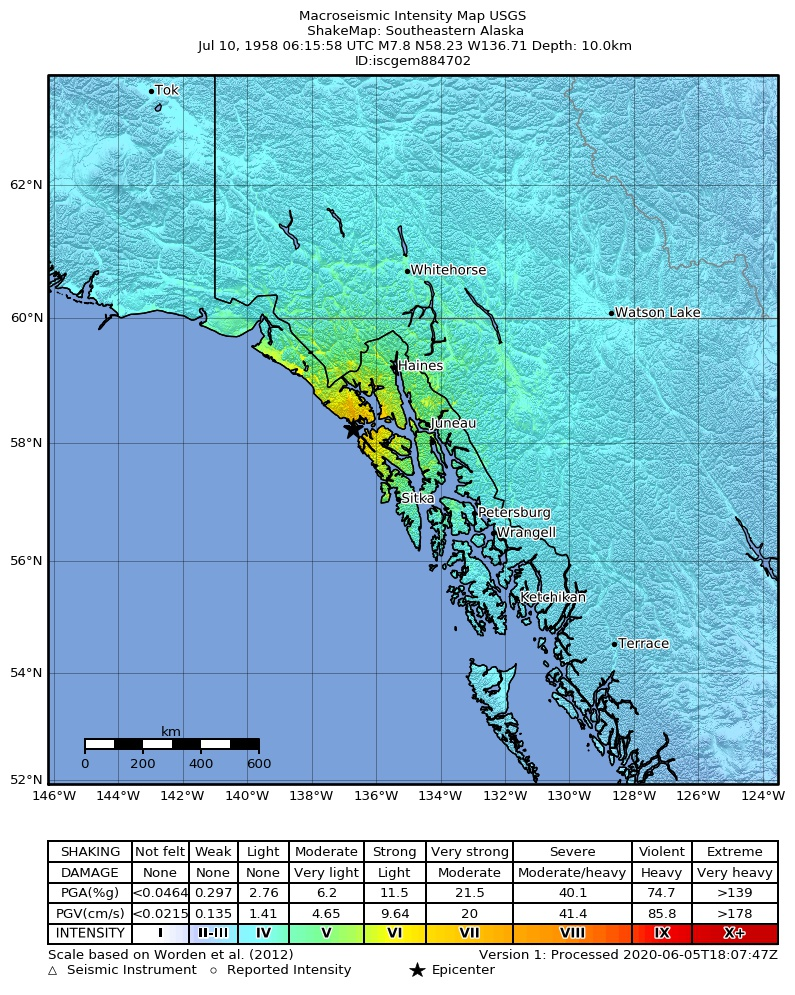
- USGS ShakeMap

- Location within Alaska
- UTC time: 1958-07-10 06:15:58
- ISC event: 884702
- USGS-ANSS: ComCat
- Local date: July 9, 1958
- Local time: 22:15 PST
- Magnitude: 7.8–8.3 M_{w}
- Depth: 35 km (22 mi)
- Epicenter: 58.370°N 136.665°W
- Fault: Fairweather Fault
- Type: Strike-slip
- Areas affected: Lituya Bay, Alaska
- Max. intensity: MMI XI (Extreme)
- Tsunami: 524 m (1,719 ft) run-up
- Casualties: 5 dead

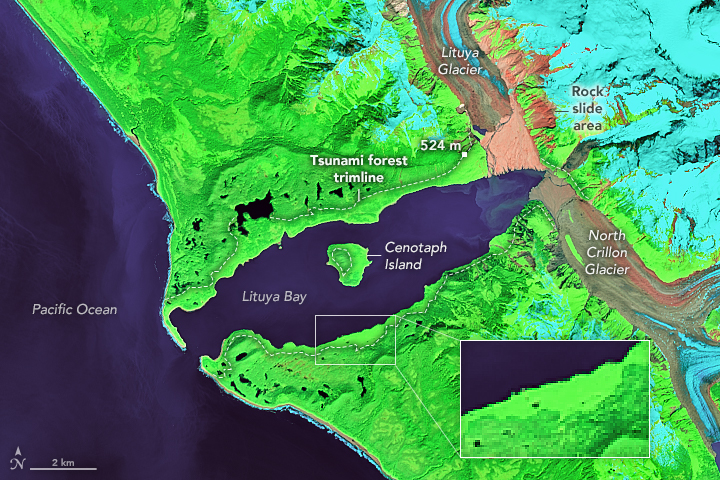
False-color Landsat 8 image of Lituya Bay, 2020. The damaged trimline is still imprinted in the forest. The lighter green areas along the shore indicate places where forests are younger than older trees (darker areas) that were not affected by the tsunami.

An earthquake occurred in Lituya Bay, Alaska, on July 9, 1958, at 22:15:58 PST (July 10 at 06:15:58 UTC) with a moment magnitude of 7.8 to 8.3 and a maximum Mercalli intensity of XI (Extreme). The strike-slip earthquake took place on the Fairweather Fault and triggered a rockslide of 30 million cubic meters (40 million cubic yards) and about 90 million tons into the narrow inlet of the bay. The impact was heard 80 kilometers (50 mi) away, and the sudden displacement of water resulted in a megatsunami that washed out trees to a maximum elevation of 524 meters (1,719 feet) at the entrance of Gilbert Inlet. This is the largest and most significant megatsunami in modern times; it forced a re-evaluation of large-wave events and the recognition of impact events, rockfalls, and landslides as causes of very large waves.

== Event outline ==
Lituya Bay is a fjord located on the Fairweather Fault in the northeastern part of the Gulf of Alaska. It is a T-shaped bay with a width of 2 miles (3 km) and a length of 7 miles (11 km). Lituya Bay is an ice-scoured tidal inlet with a maximum depth of 722 feet (220 m). The narrow entrance of the bay has a depth of only 33 feet (10 m). The two arms that create the top of the T-shape of the bay are the Gilbert and Crillon inlets and are a part of a trench on the Fairweather Fault.

In the past 172 years, Lituya Bay has had four tsunamis over 100 ft (30 m): 1854 (395 ft or 120 m), 1899 (200 ft or 60 m), 1936 (490 ft or 150 m), and 1958 (1,720 ft or 520 m).

Near the crest of the Fairweather Mountains sit the Lituya and the North Crillon glaciers. They are each about 12 miles (19 km) long and 1 mile (1.6 km) wide with an elevation of 4,000 feet (1,200 m). The retreats of these glaciers form the present "T" shape of the bay, the Gilbert and Crillon inlets.

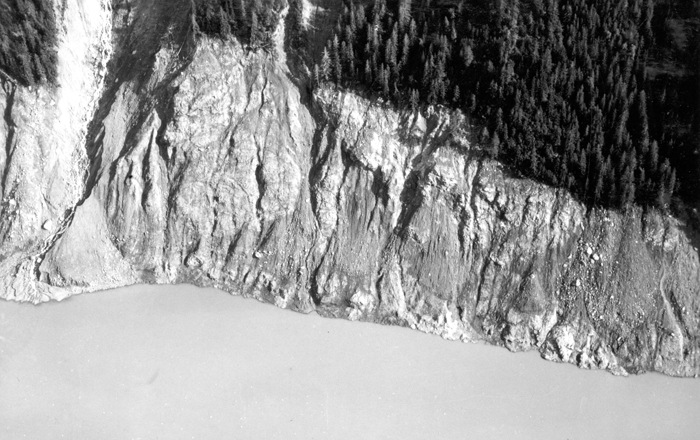
Part of the south shore of Lituya Bay showing the trimline, with bare rock below

=== Earthquake ===
The major earthquake that struck on the Fairweather Fault had a moment magnitude of 7.8 and a maximum perceived intensity of XI (Extreme) on the Mercalli intensity scale. The epicenter of the quake was at latitude 58.37° N, longitude 136.67° W near the Fairweather Range, 7.5 miles (12.1 km) east of the surface trace of the Fairweather fault, and 13 miles (21 km) southeast of Lituya Bay. This earthquake was the strongest in over 50 years for this region, since the Cape Yakataga earthquake on September 3, 1899, which was estimated to be magnitude 8.2 on the Richter scale. The shock was felt in southeastern Alaskan cities over an area of 400,000 square miles (1,000,000 km^{2}), as far south as Seattle, Washington, and as far east as Whitehorse, Yukon, Canada.

=== Rockfall ===
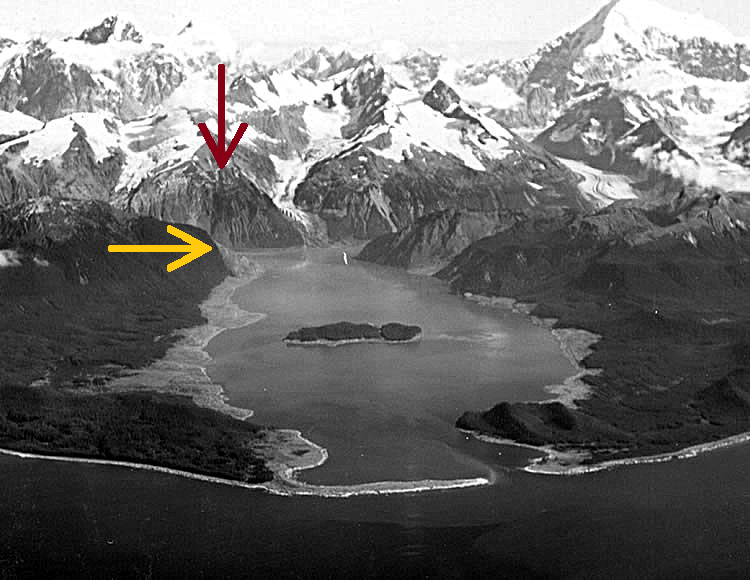
Damage from the 1958 Lituya Bay megatsunami can be seen in this oblique aerial photograph of Lituya Bay, Alaska as the lighter areas at the shore where trees have been stripped away. The red arrow shows the location of the landslide, and the yellow arrow shows the location of the high point of the wave sweeping over the headland.

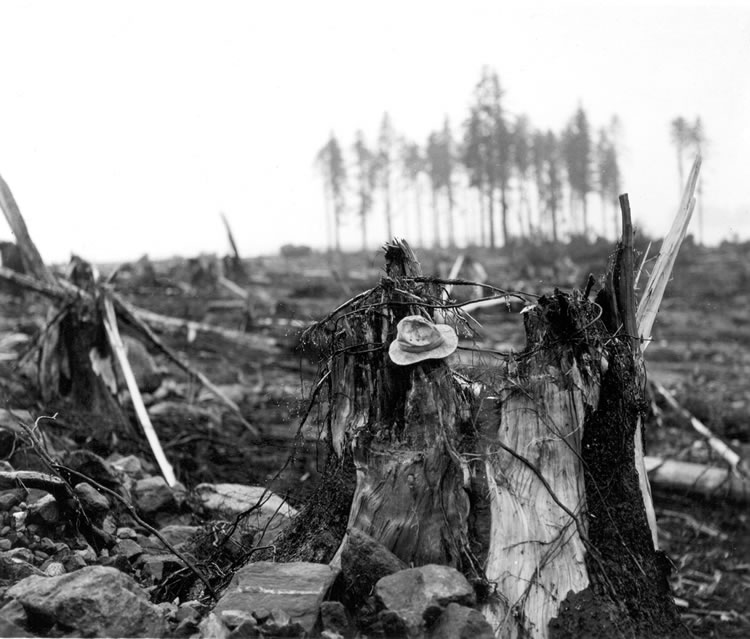
Damage to a tree at the mouth of the bay from the wave. Hat placed on stump for scale.

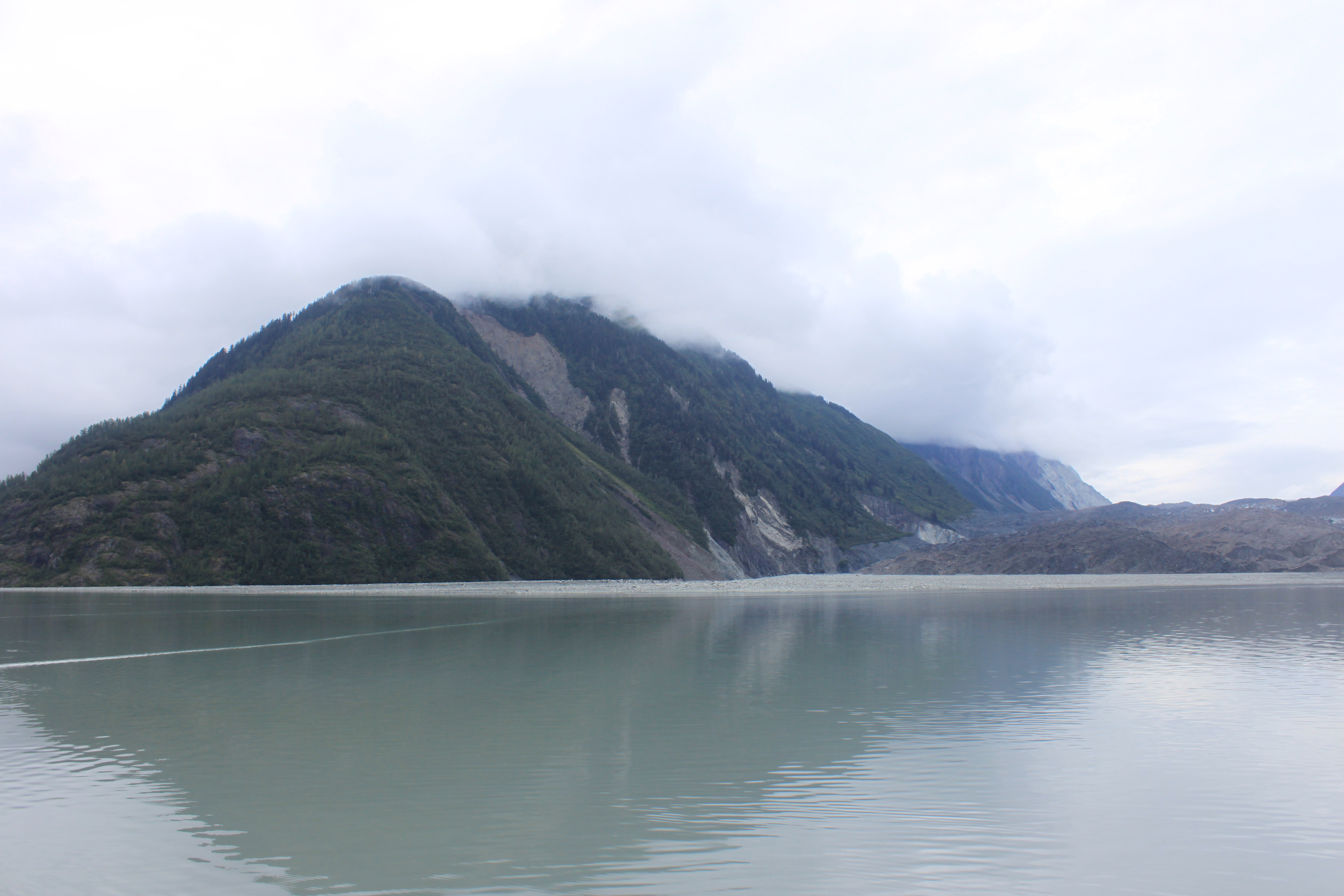
The effects of the tsunami still visible in 2010. Differently-aged vegetation grows on the ridge separating Lituya Glacier from the main part of the bay. The orientation is looking north from the head of the bay, with Lituya Glacier to the right.

Diagram of the 1958 Lituya Bay megatsunami showing the landslide movement, wave movement, and areas devastated by the wave with the use of arrows.

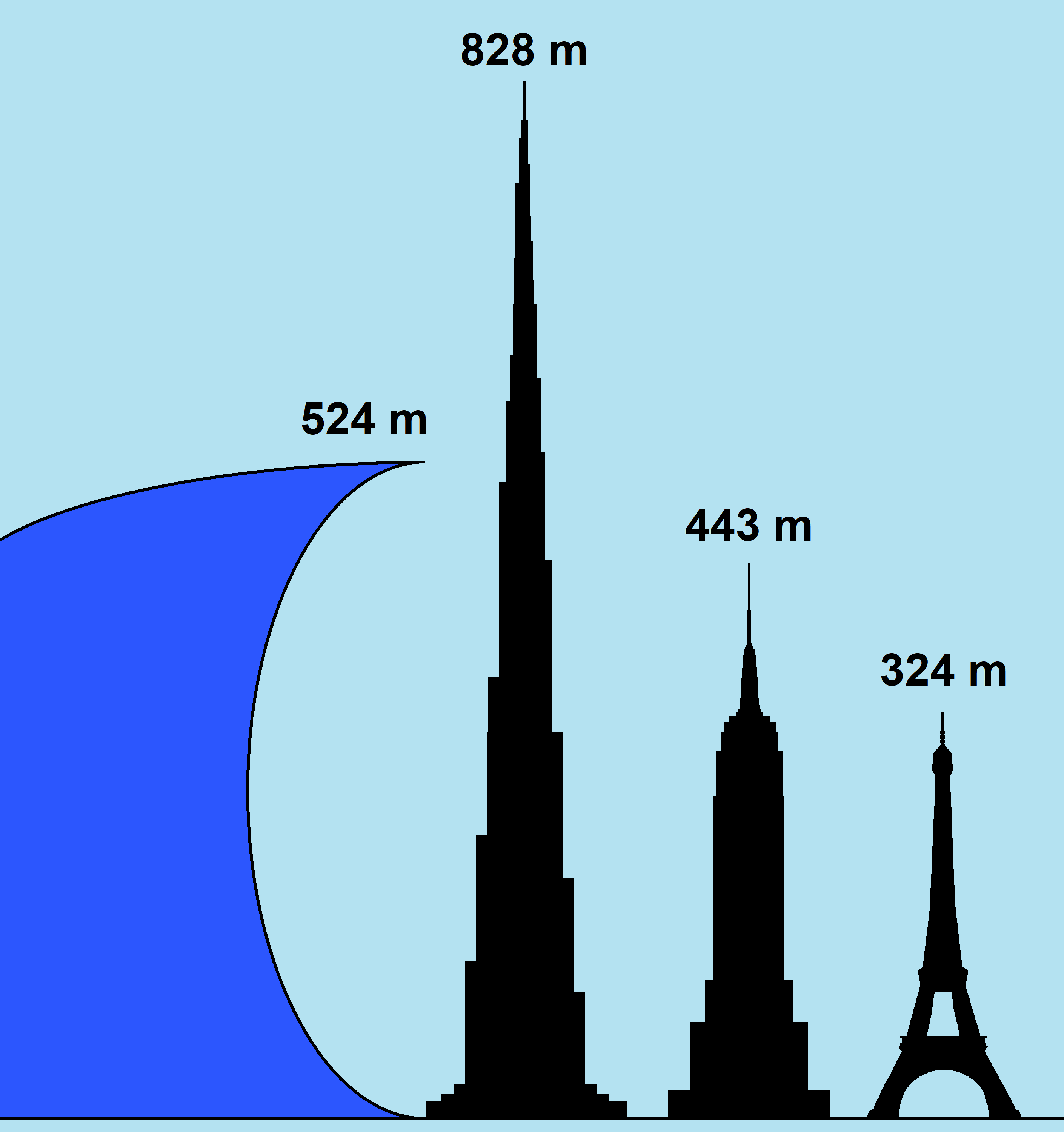
Height of megatsunami, compared with Burj Khalifa, Empire State Building and Eiffel Tower (note: this is the run up height of the wave and not the height of the wave as it hit the shore).

The earthquake caused a subaerial rockfall in the Gilbert Inlet. Over 30 million cubic meters of rock fell from a height of several hundred meters into the bay, creating a megatsunami. The impact of the rockslide included the creation of wave run up that shaved up to 400m of ice off the front of the Lituya Glacier and eroded or completely eradicated its rocky deltas. After the earthquake it was observed that a subglacial lake, located northwest of the bend in the Lituya Glacier at the head of Lituya Bay, had dropped 100 ft (30 m). This proposed another possible cause to the production of the 100 ft (30 m) wave which caused destruction as high as 1,720 ft (520 m) above the surface of the bay as its momentum carried it upslope. The wave caused damage to the vegetation up the headlands around the area where the rockfall occurred, up to a height of 524 meters, as well as along the shoreline of the bay. It is possible that a good amount of water drained from the glacial lake through a glacial tunnel flowing directly in front of the glacier, though neither the rate of drainage nor the volume of water drained could produce a wave of such magnitude. Even if a large enough drainage were to take place in front of the Gilbert Glacier, the run-off would have been projected to be on the opposite side in Crillon Inlet. After these considerations it was determined that glacial drainage was not the mechanism that caused the giant wave.

=== Megatsunami ===
The Lituya Bay megatsunami caused damage at higher elevations than any other tsunami, being powerful enough to push water up the tree covered slopes of the fjord with enough force to clear trees to a reported height of 524 m (1,719 ft). A 1:675 recreation of the tsunami found the wave crest was 150 m (490 ft) tall. Five people were killed, many people were injured, and many homes destroyed. Two people on a fishing boat died from a wave in the bay. Two more people, a fishing boat captain and his seven-year-old son, were struck by the wave and lifted high into the air by the swell. Remarkably, both survived with minimal injuries. In Yakutat, the only permanent settlement close to the epicenter at the time, infrastructure such as bridges, docks, and oil lines all sustained damage. A wave tower collapsed and a cabin was damaged beyond repair. Sand boils and fissures occurred near the coast southeast of there, and underwater cables that supported the Alaska Communication System were cut. Lighter damage was also reported in Pelican and Sitka. It ripped limbs off trees and swept many away, decimating the shoreline's surrounding forest and leaving the high tide line barren and with few upright surviving trees except on the northern and southern edges. The megatsunami flooded the entire bay and created a damage line up to 213 m (699 ft) around the outline of the bay, with evidence of this damage line still visible from space to this day.

== Eyewitness accounts ==
=== Swanson account ===
At 22:15 hours PST on July 9, 1958, which was still daylight at that time of year, an earthquake with a magnitude of 7.8 struck the Lituya Bay area. The tide was ebbing at about plus 1.5 m and the weather was clear. Anchored in a cove near the west side of the entrance of the bay, Bill and Vivian Swanson were on their boat fishing when the earthquake hit:

With the first jolt, I tumbled out of the bunk and looked toward the head of the bay where all the noise was coming from. The mountains were shaking something awful, with slide of rock and snow, but what I noticed mostly was the glacier, the north glacier, the one they call Lituya Glacier. I know you can't ordinarily see that glacier from where I was anchored. People shake their heads when I tell them I saw it that night. I can't help it if they don't believe me. I know the glacier is hidden by the point when you're in Anchorage Cove, but I know what I saw that night, too. The glacier had risen in the air and moved forward so it was in sight. It must have risen several hundred feet. I don't mean it was just hanging in the air. It seems to be solid, but it was jumping and shaking like crazy. Big chunks of ice were falling off the face of it and down into the water. That was six miles away and they still looked like big chunks. They came off the glacier like a big load of rocks spilling out of a dump truck. That went on for a little while—it's hard to tell just how long—and then suddenly the glacier dropped back out of sight and there was a big wall of water going over the point. The wave started for us right after that and I was too busy to tell what else was happening up there.

=== Ulrich account ===
When the earthquake struck, Howard G. Ulrich and his 7-year-old son were in Lituya Bay aboard their boat, the Edrie. They were anchored in a small inlet on the southern side of the bay. The two had gone out on the water at 20:00 hours PST and when the earthquake hit, the resulting rocking of his boat woke Ulrich up. He observed the wave's formation from the deck, hearing a very loud smash at the base of Lituya Bay. In his record of the wave he notes the appearance of it and how it formed:

The wave definitely started in Gilbert Inlet, just before the end of the quake. It was not a wave at first. It was like an explosion, or a glacier sluff. The wave came out of the lower part, and looked like the smallest part of the whole thing. The wave did not go up 1,800 feet, the water splashed there.

The wave made its way to his boat 2–3 minutes after he saw it and carried the Edrie down to the southern shore and then back near the center of the bay. Ulrich was able to control the boat once the main wave passed, maneuvering through subsequent waves up to 20 ft high until he could finally exit the bay.

== Evidence of past events ==
Four or five megatsunamis are believed to have occurred at Lituya Bay during a 150-year period:

- Reports by early explorers of the loss of all trees and vegetation along the shore, and cut tree-lines. One example is the log of the French Count de Lapérouse who was the first European person to discover the bay in 1786.
- "At least one and possibly two waves" between 1854 and 1916, based on photographic evidence.
- A further event that erased the above evidence and uprooted trees over 150 meters (490 feet) up the sides of the bay, in 1936.
- The 1958 event.

== Ongoing debate ==
There is an ongoing debate in scholarly circles regarding whether the megatsunami was a result of the rockfall generated by the earthquake, or a result of the earthquake itself. Various analyses to determine the true cause have been conducted.

=== 1999 analysis ===
The mechanism giving rise to megatsunamis was analyzed for the Lituya Bay event in a study presented at the Tsunami Society in 1999.

Although the earthquake which caused the megatsunami was very energetic and involved strong ground movements, several possible mechanisms were not likely or able to have caused the resulting megatsunami. Neither water drainage from a lake, nor landslide, nor the force of the earthquake itself led to the megatsunami, although all of these may have contributed.

Instead, the megatsunami was caused by a massive and sudden impulsive impact when about 40 million cubic yards of rock several hundred meters above the bay was fractured from the side of the bay, by the earthquake, and fell "practically as a monolithic unit" down the almost vertical slope and into the bay. The rockfall also caused air to be dragged along due to viscosity effects, which added to the volume of displacement, and further impacted the sediment on the floor of the bay, creating a large crater. The study concluded that:

The giant wave runup of 1,720 feet (520 m) at the head of the Bay and the subsequent huge wave along the main body of Lituya Bay which occurred on July 9, 1958, were caused primarily by an enormous subaerial rockfall into Gilbert Inlet at the head of Lituya Bay, triggered by dynamic earthquake ground motions along the Fairweather Fault.

The large mass of rock, acting as a monolith (thus resembling high-angle asteroid impact), struck with great force the sediments at bottom of Gilbert Inlet at the head of the bay. The impact created a large crater and displaced and folded recent and Tertiary deposits and sedimentary layers to an unknown depth. The displaced water and the displacement and folding of the sediments broke and uplifted 1,300 feet (400 meters) of ice along the entire front of the Lituya Glacier at the north end of Gilbert Inlet. Also, the impact and the sediment displacement by the rockfall resulted in an air bubble and in water splashing action that reached the 1,720-foot (520 m) elevation on the other side of the head of Gilbert Inlet. The same rockfall impact, in combination with the strong ground movements, the net vertical crustal uplift of about 3.5 feet [1.1 meters], and an overall tilting seaward of the entire crustal block on which Lituya Bay was situated, generated the giant solitary gravity wave which swept the main body of the bay.

This was the most likely scenario of the event – the "PC model" that was adopted for subsequent mathematical modeling studies with source dimensions and parameters provided as input.

Computer-generated video of Lituya Bay Tsunami generated by a rockslide

Subsequent mathematical modeling at the Los Alamos National Laboratory (Mader, 1999, Mader & Gittings, 2002) supported the proposed mechanism – as there was indeed sufficient volume of water and an adequately deep layer of sediments in the Lituya Bay inlet to account for the giant wave runup and the subsequent inundation. The modeling reproduced the documented physical observations of runup.

=== 2010 analysis ===
A 2010 model examined the amount of infill on the floor of the bay, which was many times larger than that of the rockfall alone, as well as the energy and height of the waves. Scientists concluded that there had been a "dual slide" involving a rockfall which also triggered a release of 5 to 10 times its volume of sediment trapped by the adjacent Lituya Glacier, a ratio comparable with other events where this "dual slide" effect is known to have happened. Lituya Bay has a history of megatsunami events, but the 1958 event was the first for which sufficient data was captured and was responsible for the deaths of 5 people.

A subsequent analysis to the 1999 study which examined the wider impact of the event found that the rockfall itself was inadequate to explain the resulting accounts and evidence. In particular, the amount of sediment apparently added to the bay, judging by the sea-floor shape, was much greater than could be explained by the rockfall alone, or even the rockfall and sediment disturbed by it, and the energy of the resulting waves from the rockfall and stirred-up sediment would not have been sufficient. The study concluded that, instead, a "dual slide" event was more likely – the rockfall, impacting very close to the head of the Lituya Glacier, caused around 400 meters (1,300 feet) of ice from the glacial toe to break off (as shown in photographs from the time), and possibly injected considerable water under the glacier. The glacier, lightened, rose before stabilizing in the water, and a large amount of trapped infill (subglacial and proglacial sediment) that was trapped under the glacier and had already been loosened by the earthquake was released as an almost immediate and many times larger second slide. The debris released was estimated by the study as being between 5 and 10 times the volume of the initial rockfall, a bulking ratio comparable with that of other events such as the September 2002 Kolka-Karmadon rock ice slide (estimated ratio between 5 and 10), the November 1987 Parraguirre landslide (est. ratio 2.5) and the May 1970 Huascarán landslide (est. ratio 4). This additional volume would explain the large changes in the underwater shape of the sea floor in the bay, and the additional energy of waves, especially at the western end of the bay. The paper's authors suggest that core samples may show a 70-meter (230-foot) deep layer of reworked sediment if this model is correct.

== See also ==
- Icy Bay (Alaska) for a very similar event in 2015
- Tracy Arm for the second largest tsunami in 2025
- List of earthquakes in 1958
- List of earthquakes in Alaska
- List of earthquakes in the United States
- List of tsunamis
- Lituya Mountain
