= Explorer plate =

Northeast Pacific tectonic plate

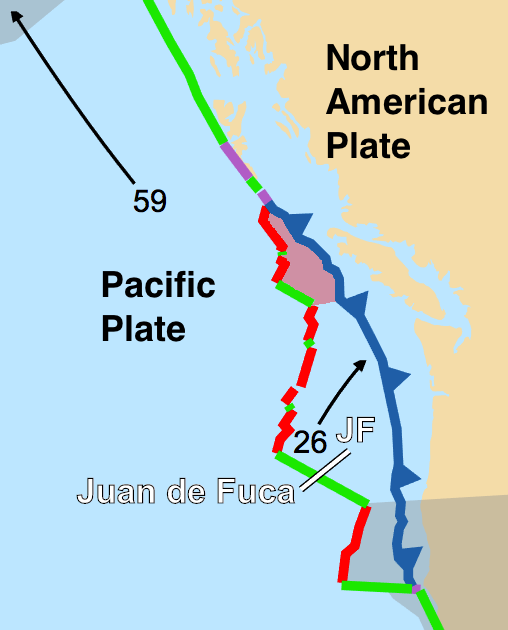
- Type: Microplate
- Coordinates: 49.5°N 129.5°W
- Approximate area: 18,000 km^{2} (6,900 sq mi)
- Movement^{1}: Northeast
- Speed^{1}: Up to 20 mm/year
- Features: Pacific Ocean
- ^{1}Relative to the African plate

The Explorer plate is an oceanic tectonic plate beneath the Pacific Ocean off the west coast of Vancouver Island, Canada, which is partially subducted under the North American plate. Along with the Juan de Fuca plate and Gorda plate, the Explorer plate is a remnant of the ancient Farallon plate, which has been subducted under the North American plate. The Explorer plate separated from the Juan de Fuca plate roughly 4 million years ago. In its smoother, southern half, the average depth of the Explorer plate is roughly 2,400 metres (7,900 ft) and rises up in its northern half to a highly variable basin between 1,400 metres (4,600 ft) and 2,200 metres (7,200 ft) in depth.

== Boundaries ==
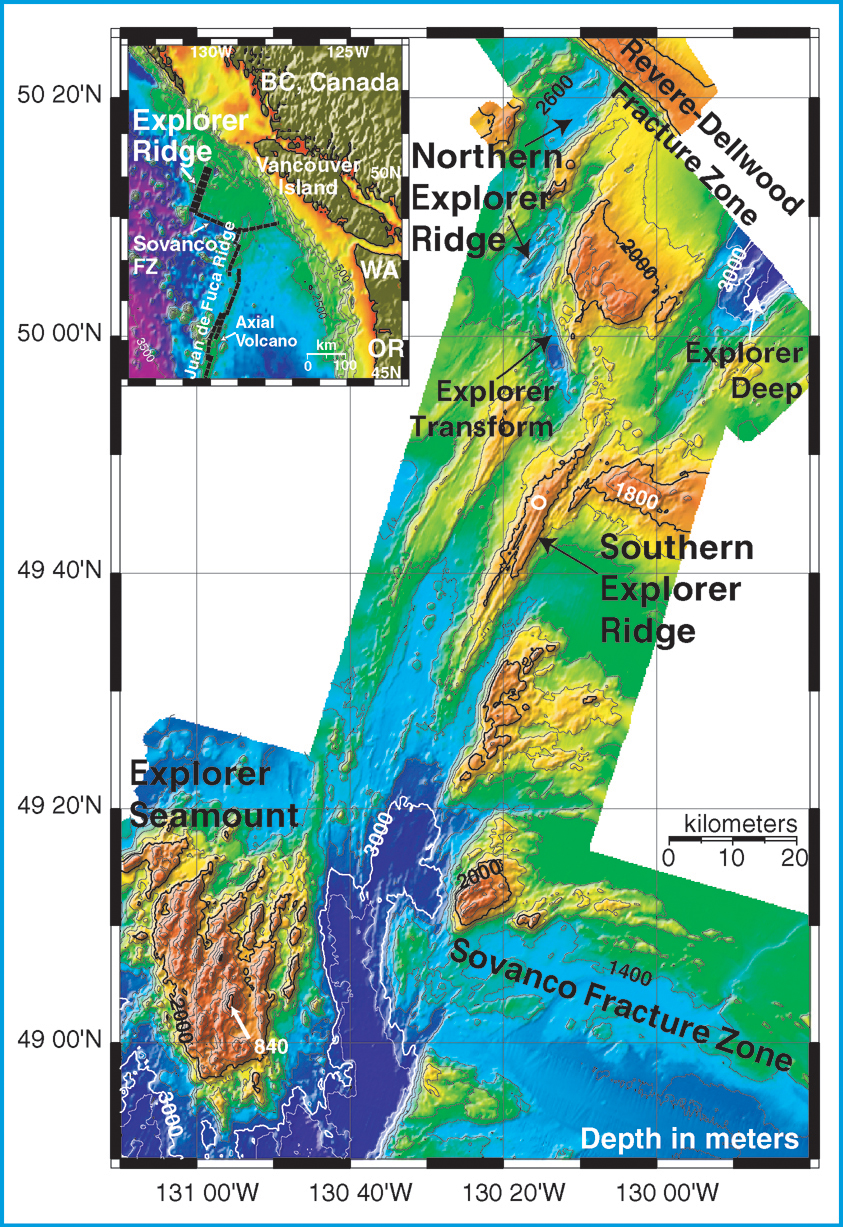
Bathymetric profile of Explorer Ridge region

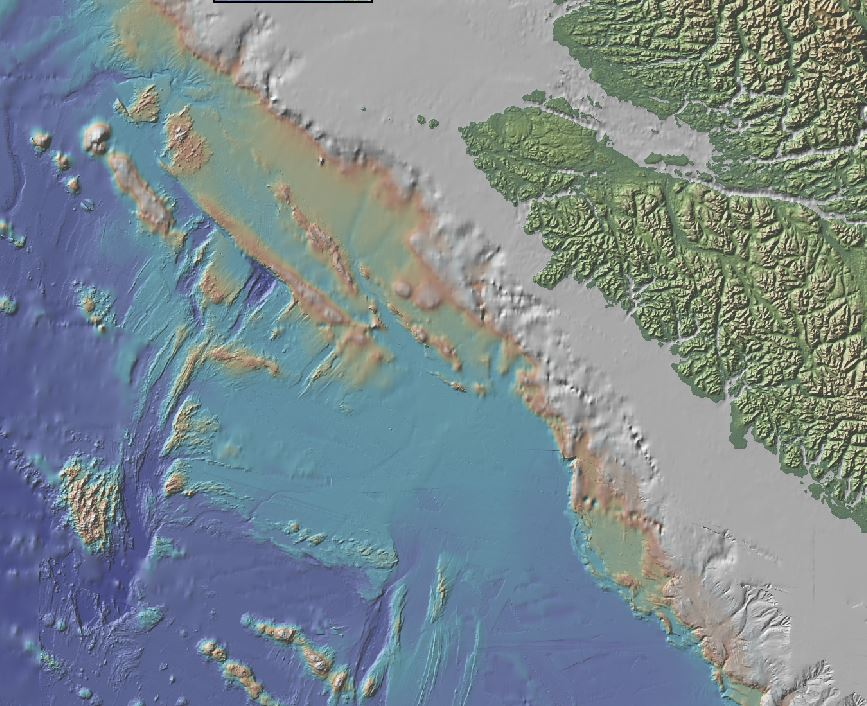
Bathymetric profile of the Explorer plate region

The eastern boundary of the Explorer plate is being subducted under the North American plate. The southern boundary is a collection of transform faults, the Sovanco fracture zone, separating the Explorer plate from the Pacific plate. To the southeast is another transform boundary, the Nootka Fault, which separates the Explorer plate from the Juan de Fuca plate and forms a triple junction with the North American plate. To the northwest is a divergent boundary with the Pacific plate forming the Explorer Ridge, and the Winona Basin located within the northwest boundaries and the Pacific continental shelf. The Queen Charlotte triple junction is located where the Pacific plate and North American plate meets with the Explorer plate.

== Formation and evolution ==
Upon breaking apart 4 million years ago, the Juan de Fuca plate continued moving northeast at 26 mm/year (1 in/year) while the Explorer plate's velocity changed, stalling or moving slowly north up to 20 mm/year. The Nootka Fault boundary between the Juan de Fuca plate and the Explorer plate has varied in length and direction since their separation. The formation of the Nookta Fault and the shearing of plate boundaries has caused a clockwise rotation, reorienting the Sovanco fracture zone northwards along the North American plate and slowing the Explorer plate's subduction. The Sovanco fracture zone originated as a spreading center offset more than 7 million years ago which shows southward movement from the influence of the Explorer ridge and results in uneven spreading eastward unto the Explorer plate.

== Current state of subduction ==
The subducted portion of the plate extends downward to more than 300 km (186 mi) depth, and laterally as far as mainland Canada. The relative buoyancy of the subducting plate and the underlying mantle may be inhibiting the Explorer plate's ability to descend further into the mantle.

There is an ongoing debate regarding the process of subduction of the Explorer plate and how the boundary between the Explorer plate and the North American plate are defined:

1. The Explorer plate has stopped and may eventually accrete, fusing with the North American plate as the subduction has fully stopped and will eventually become a plate boundary between the North American plate and Pacific plate rather than continuing its subduction.
2. The Explorer plate consists of two parts with half being fused to the North American plate and the other half remaining a microplate system.
3. The Explorer plate has slowed to a terminal speed of 20 mm/year, and will continue until the entire plate is subducted.

== Seismic activity ==
As a part of the Pacific Ring of Fire, the Explorer plate has a high level of seismic activity. However, the activity consists of low-magnitude events; no earthquake above magnitude 6.5 has been recorded in the region, though a swarm of several dozen magnitude 5–6 earthquakes occurred just north of the Seminole Seamount in 2008. The Explorer plate is the most seismically active area of Canada, but is anomalous as a subduction zone since most of the seismic activity occurs around the plate's perimeter rather than at the subduction interface. Events are generally centered around the southern and north-western areas where the borders of the plate are in contact with other plates; however, the newer ocean crust created at the Explorer and Juan de Fuca ridges reduces the rigidity of the region and contributes to the low magnitude of events in the region.

== See also ==
- Geology of the Pacific Northwest
