= Nootka Fault =

Fault off the coast of British Columbia, Canada

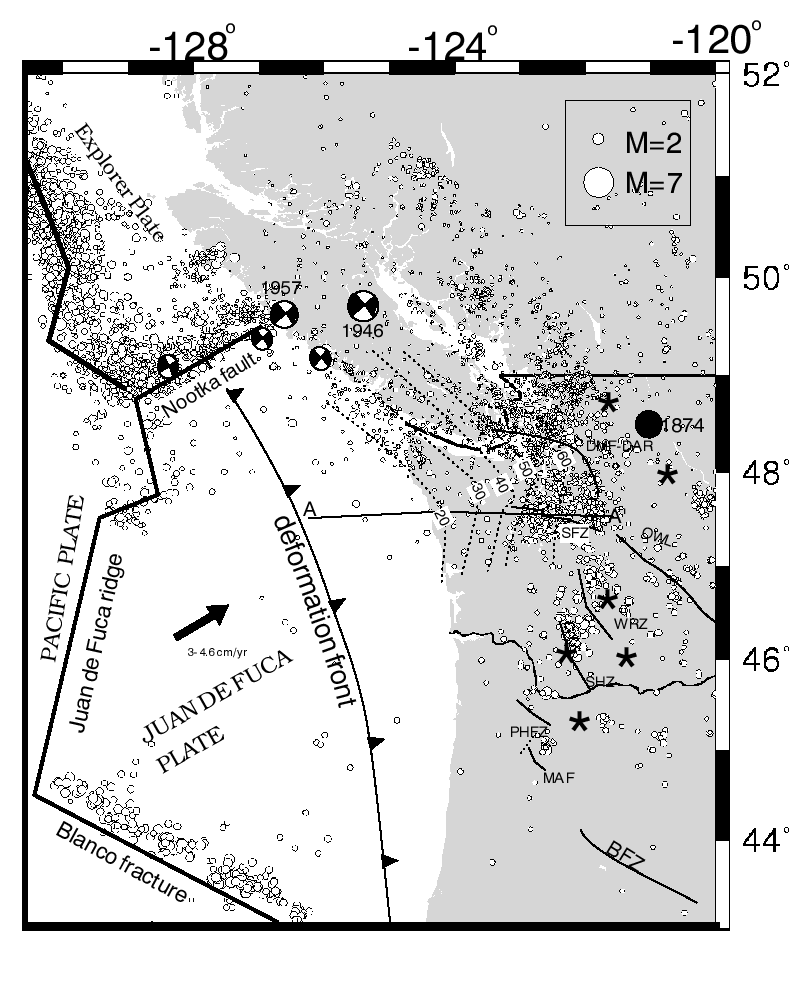
- The Nootka Fault, upper left
- Location: Nootka Island
- Country: Canada

Tectonics
- Status: Active
- Type: transform fault

The Nootka Fault is an active transform fault running southwest from Nootka Island, near Vancouver Island, British Columbia, Canada.

== Geology ==
The Nootka Fault lies between the Explorer plate in the north and Juan de Fuca plate in the south. These are remnants of the once vast Farallon plate. The fault is at the triple junction of the North American plate, Explorer plate, and Juan de Fuca plate.

Near the Nootka Fault is an active undersea mud volcano named Maquinna.

== Footnotes ==
Bibliography

- Hyndman, R. D.; Riddihough, R. P.; Herzer, R. (September 1979), "The Nootka Fault Zone – a new plate boundary off western Canada", Geophysical Journal International, 58 (3): 667–683, Bibcode:1979GeoJ...58..667H, doi:10.1111/j.1365-246X.1979.tb04801.x
