= 1949 Queen Charlotte Islands earthquake =

Magnitude 8.1 earthquake in the Canadian Pacific Northwest

- Location within British Columbia
- UTC time: 1949-08-22 04:01:18
- ISC event: 896789
- USGS-ANSS: ComCat
- Local date: August 21, 1949
- Local time: 20:01 PDT
- Magnitude: 8.0 M_{w} 8.1 M_{s}
- Depth: 10.0 km (6.2 mi)
- Epicenter: 53.62°N 133.27°W
- Type: Strike-slip
- Areas affected: Canada
- Max. intensity: MMI VIII (Severe)
- Tsunami: 0.61 m (2 ft 0 in)
- Aftershocks: M_{w} 6.3 Aug 23 at 8:24:35 UTC
- Casualties: None

The 1949 Queen Charlotte Islands earthquake struck Haida Gwaii (at the time known as the Queen Charlotte Islands) and the Pacific Northwest coast at 8:01 p.m. PDT on August 21. The earthquake had a moment magnitude of 8.0 and a surface-wave magnitude of 8.1. The maximum Mercalli Intensity in the event was VIII (Severe).

The interplate earthquake began in the ocean bottom just off the rugged coast of Graham Island. It ruptured along the Queen Charlotte Fault both northward and southward more than 500 km (311 mi). Shaking was felt throughout British Columbia, parts of Washington, Oregon, Alberta, the Yukon, and Alaska. No deaths were reported in this earthquake.

== Earthquake ==
The 1949 Queen Charlotte Islands earthquake was caused by a rupture on the Queen Charlotte Fault, which forms part of the boundary between the Pacific and North American plates. This fault runs from northern Vancouver Island, west of Haida Gwaii, up to the Gulf of Alaska. The earthquake ruptured the fault for a distance more than 500 km (311 mi).

Because this quake occurred before the modern surface wave magnitude scale was developed and widely implemented, this earthquake may have only had the same overall intensity as the 2012 Haida Gwaii earthquake. In future there may be some research done to compare the two earthquake events.

This earthquake, larger than the 1906 San Francisco earthquake, is Canada's largest earthquake recorded by seismometers. However, the greatest known earthquake in Canadian history was the 1700 Cascadia earthquake, a megathrust earthquake that occurred along the Pacific Northwest coast from Northern California to southwestern British Columbia which reached an estimated magnitude 9 on the Richter scale.

== Damage ==
Although nobody was killed in this earthquake, people and animals were knocked off their feet and there were landslides and other damage. Chimneys tumbled, and an oil tank at Cumshewa Inlet collapsed.

In the service community of Terrace, over 300 km (185 mi) away on the mainland, cars were bounced around, and standing on the street was described as "like being on the heaving deck of a ship at sea". In the port city of Prince Rupert, around 200 km (125 mi) from the epicenter, windows were destroyed and buildings swung.

== See also ==
- List of earthquakes in 1949
- List of earthquakes in Canada
