= 1899 Yakutat Bay earthquakes =

Series of earthquakes in Alaska, USA

1899 Yakutat Bay Earthquakes
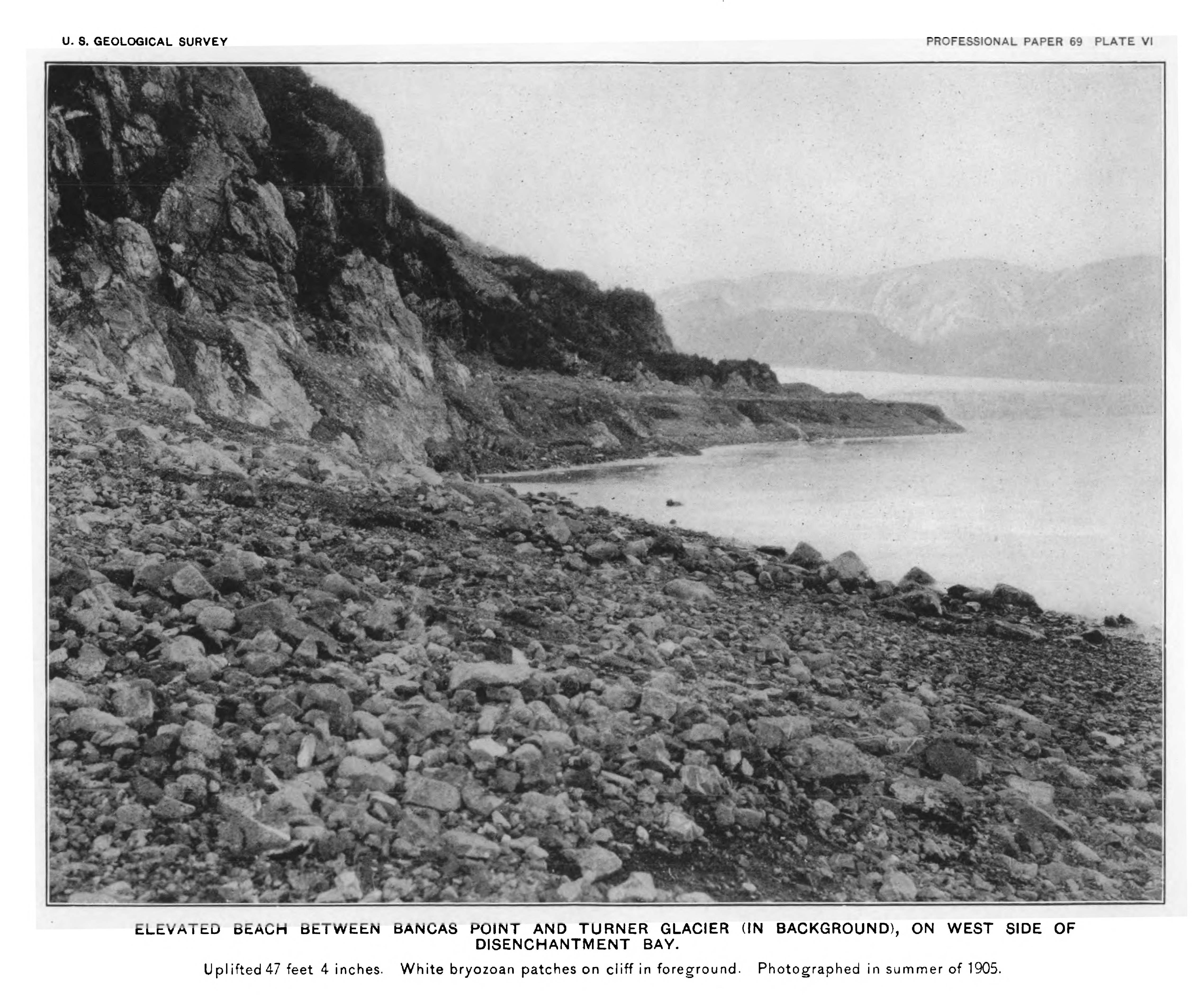
- A raised beach in an area of Yakutat Bay, Alaska, uplifted by 47 feet in the 1899 earthquakes. The white patches on the cliff in the foreground are the remains of bryozoa, which would have been in the inter-tidal zone when alive.

- Location within Alaska
- UTC time: 1899-09-10
- USGS-ANSS: ComCat
- Local date: September 10, 1899
- Local time: 12:22
- Magnitude: 8.2 M_{w}, 8.5 M_{s}, M 8.6
- Epicenter: 60.0°N 140.0°W
- Max. intensity: MMI XI (Extreme)

During September 1899 there was a series of severe earthquakes in the region around Yakutat Bay in Alaska. The most powerful of these occurred on September 3 and September 10 at about noon, local time. The area was sparsely populated and no fatalities were recorded, but the earthquakes were notable for the degree of elevation recorded, up to 47 feet, and for the effects on the glaciers in the region. Fieldwork on the effects of the earthquake was carried out between 1905 and 1910, and a summary report was published in 1912. The September 3rd large shock's magnitude is debated, but it ranges from 8.2–8.5. The second earthquake on September the 10th was also a comparably large shock, with magnitudes ranging from 8.2–8.6.

== Eyewitness accounts ==
The most dramatic accounts came from a group of prospectors whose camp was close to a glacial stream about a mile SE of the ice cliff of Hubbard Glacier. After the initial shock on the morning of September 10, they rigged up a seismograph using dangling knives, and counted 52 shocks before the most powerful shock occurred at noon. This was strong enough that the men could not stand, and some of them avoided being thrown about by holding on to the tent pole. The shock lasted several minutes, with the ground shaking like the swell of the sea. There was a lake above the camp, which burst its bank due to the shock, and deluged the site of the camp with water and debris. Shortly after this a wave of water 20 feet high came in from the sea. All escaped to the higher ground, though losing most of their provisions. After things had calmed down they returned to the campsite to find that one of their boats had survived intact. The next morning they found an empty damaged native canoe that they were able to repair, and with the two boats were able to make their way to the small settlement of Yakutat. This took several days, as they had to make their way through a mass of floating ice. When they reached Yakutat they found the place empty, and the whole village camped out on the hill behind the village.

== Uplift ==
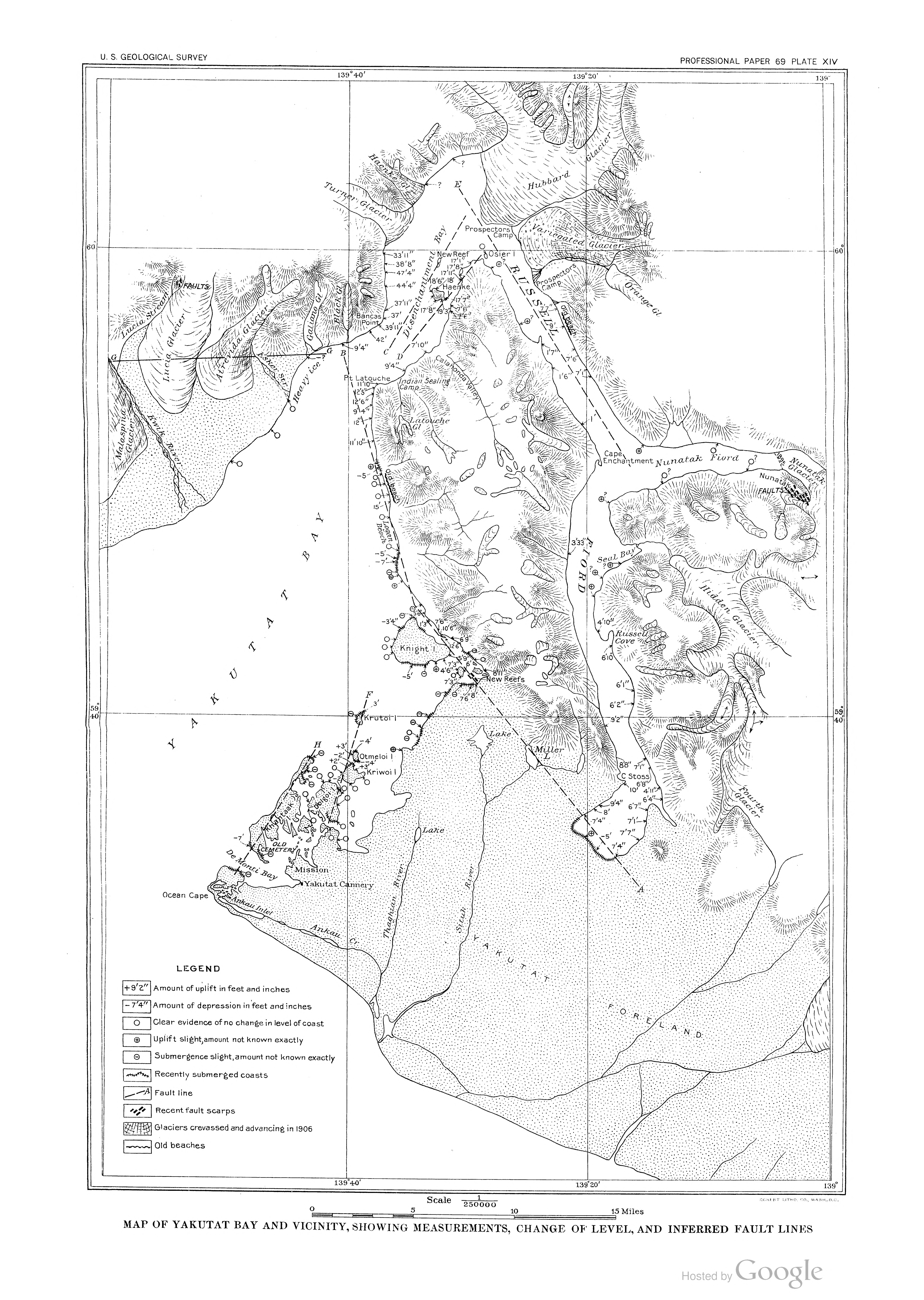
Map of the Earthquakes At Yakutat Bay showing measurements, change of level, and inferred fault lines

Field investigations by members of the US Geological Survey in subsequent years found evidence of substantial changes in ground level in the affected areas, mostly uplift. The evidence was of several types: physiographic, such as elevated sea-cliffs, sea-caves, and beaches as well as new reefs and islands; biologic, most conspicuously barnacles, whose shells were often found still attached to the rocks well above the highest tidal level, and the killing of trees by saltwater where depression had occurred; and human testimony, both comparison with reports of previous expeditions and the evidence of native american inhabitants who knew the coast well from their hunting activities. Taken together they found evidence for uplift of up to 47 feet (about 14 metres). This is more than had ever been reported up to that date

== Effects on glaciers ==
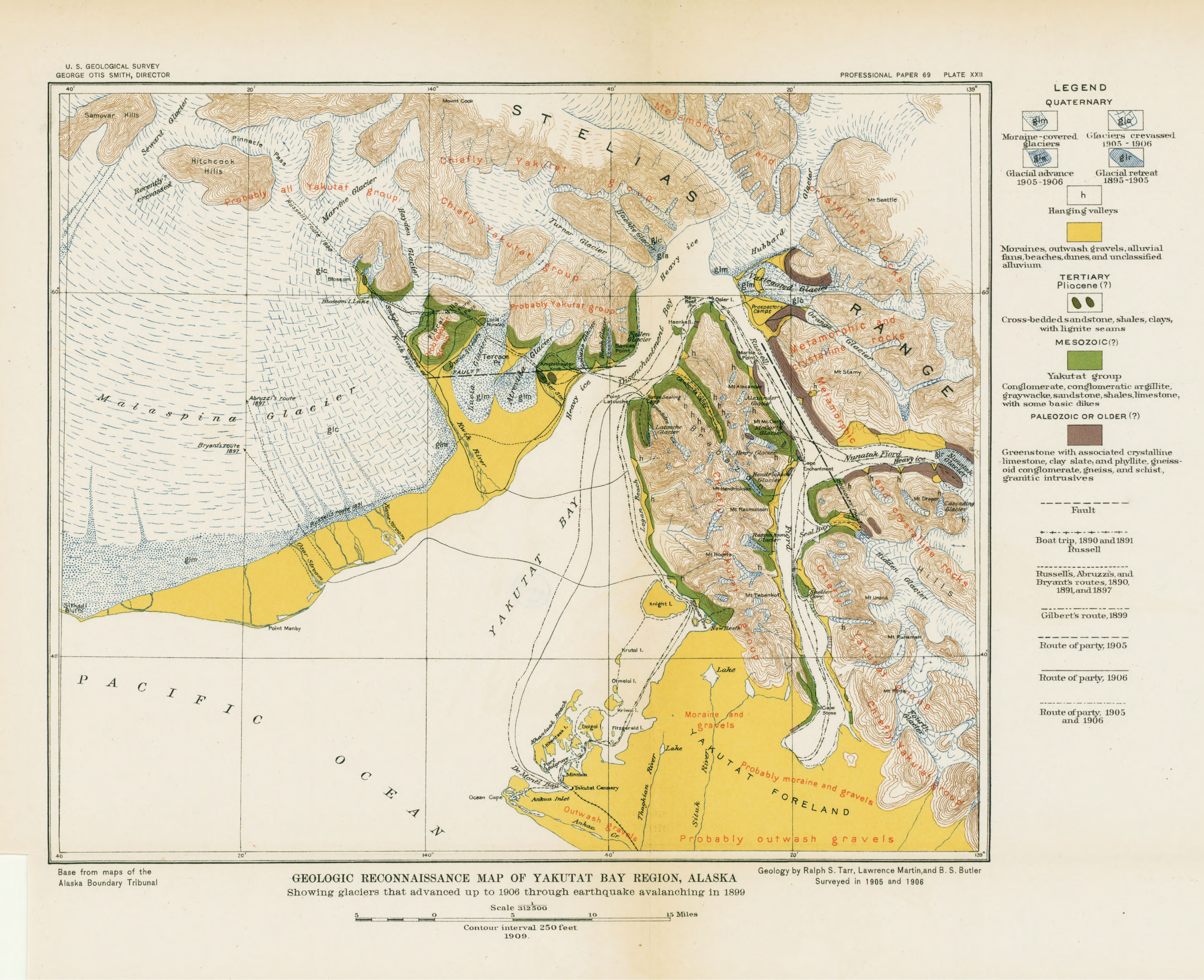
Map showing glaciers that advanced up to 1906 through earthquake avalanching in 1899

The immediate effect of the earthquake on the glaciers of the Yakutat Bay region was shattering of the ice at the margins of the glaciers. This led to a release of many icebergs (which caused difficulties to the prospectors on their way to safety, and to ships arriving in the region in the days after the earthquake) and to the formation of deep crevasses, which made traverse of the ice impossible in areas that had been previously passable. Longer-term effects noted in the fieldwork were substantial advances in many of the icebergs close to the earthquake zone. Tarr and Martin attribute this to earthquake-induced avalanches in the mountainous areas above the glaciers leading to an increase in the snow and ice deposited on the upper parts of the glacier. This additional load would work its way down the track of the glacier over a period of years. By contrast, Muir Glacier, about 100 miles SE of Yakutat Bay, receded substantially in the years after the earthquake. The reasons for this are less clear.

== Further afield ==
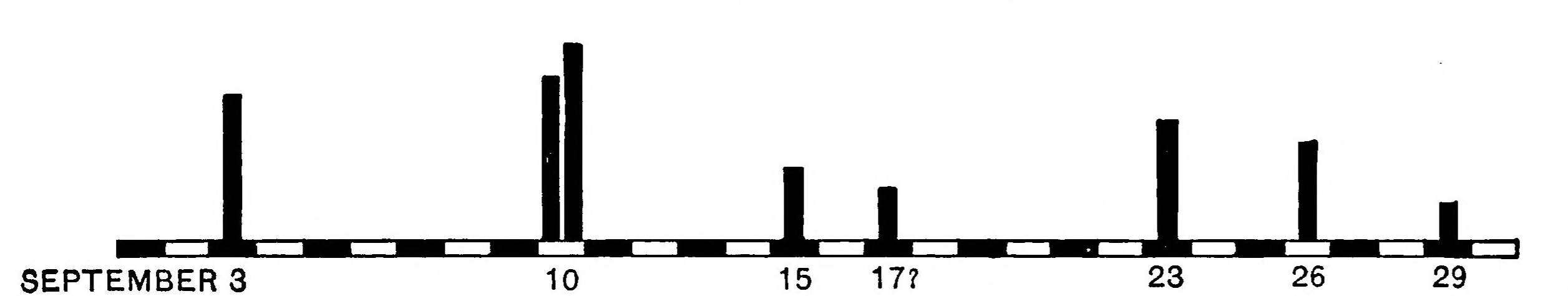
Figure showing the relative time intervals and the approximate relative intensities of the earthquakes of September, 1899 at Yakutat Bay.

The earthquake was clearly felt up to 250 miles from the centre of activity, and there were reports from up to 700 miles away that may have been of the same earthquake or of associated shocks. Seismographs throughout the world recorded the earthquake of September 10, as well as the earlier and later shocks during September. Records show that the time of the heaviest shock on September 10 was 12:22 pm local solar time, equivalent to 21:40:13 UTC. The magnitude of the earthquake has been estimated at 8.0-8.6, and the approximate location of the epicentre was 60 deg north, 140 deg west.

== See also ==
- List of historical earthquakes
- List of earthquakes in Alaska
- List of earthquakes in the United States
