= Cooperative Institute for Marine and Atmospheric Research =

US research institute

Coordinates: 21.297911°N 157.816114°W

- Established: 1977; 49 years ago
- Director: Dr. Douglas Luther
- Location: Honolulu, Hawaii, 96818, U.S.
- Website: www.soest.hawaii.edu/jimar/

The Cooperative Institute for Marine and Atmospheric Research (CIMAR) is an oceanic, atmospheric, and geophysical research institute that is sponsored jointly by the National Oceanic and Atmospheric Administration (NOAA) Office of Oceanic and Atmospheric Research (OAR) and the University of Hawaiʻi (UH). Formerly incorporated as JIMAR (Joint Institute for Marine and Atmospheric Research), it is one of 21 NOAA Cooperative Institutes (CIs).

The CIMAR research themes are:

- Ecosystem-Based Management
- Ocean Monitoring & Forecasting
- Ecosystem Monitoring
- Climate Science & Impacts
- Ecological Forecasting
- Air-Sea Interactions
- Protection & Restoration of Resources
- Tsunamis (and other long period ocean waves)
