= List of earthquakes in Alaska =

This is an incomplete list of earthquakes in Alaska.

Date	MMI	Mag.	Coordinates	Depth	Deaths	Injuries	Comments	Ref
2021-07-28	VIII	8.2 M_{w}	55.474°N 157.917°W	32.2 km			Limited damage / Tsunami	
2020-10-19	VII	7.6 M_{w}	54.66°N 159.68°W	33.3 km			Tsunami	
2020-07-22	VII	7.8 M_{w}	59.61°N 153.34°W	28.0 km				
2018-11-30	VIII	7.1 M_{w}	61.340°N 149.937°W	46.7 km		117	Road Damage	
2018-01-23	IV	7.9 M_{w}	56.058°N 149.097°W	10 km				
2016-01-24	VII	7.1 M_{w}	59.61°N 153.34°W	127.8 km				
2014-06-23	VI	7.9 M_{w}	51.80°N 178.76°W	107.5 km			Tsunami	
2002-11-03	IX	7.9 M_{w}	63.51°N 147.6°W	13 km		1		
1986-05-07	VI	8.0 M_{w}	51.52°N 174.78°E	19 km			Moderate damage / tsunami	
1975-02-02	IX	7.6 M_{s}	53°07′N 173°30′E	10 km		15		
1965-02-03	VI	8.7 M_{w}	51.29°N 178.55°W	36 km			Tsunami	
1964-03-27	XI	9.2 M_{w}	61.04°N 147.73°W	23 km	139		Tsunami	
1958-07-10	XI	7.8 M_{w}	58.37°N 136.67°W	35 km	5		Megatsunami	
1958-04-07	VIII	7.3 M_{w}	65.915°N 156.343°W	7 km			Damage to towns	
1957-03-09	VIII	8.6 M_{w}	51.5°N 175.63°W	25 km			Tsunami	
1946-04-01	VI	8.6 M_{w}	53.49°N 162.83°W	15 km	165–173		Tsunami	
1938-10-10	VII	8.2 M_{w}	55.178°N 158.181°E	35 km				
1906-08-17		8.35 M_{w}	50.6°N 178.36°E	–				
1899-09-10		8.0 M_{w} – 8.4 M_{s}	60.0°N 140.0°W	–			47 feet (14 metres) uplift	
1899-09-03		8.2 M_{w} – 8.5 M_{s}	60.0°N 140.0°W	–				
1585-06-11		9.25 M_{w}	Aleutian Islands		Unknown		Natives killed by a tsunami in Hawaii.	
Note: The inclusion criteria for adding events are based on WikiProject Earthquakes' notability guideline that was developed for stand-alone articles. The principles described also apply to lists. In summary, only damaging, injurious, or deadly events and those of scientific interest should be recorded.

== See also ==
- Geology of Alaska
