= Nicaragua earthquake =

Nicaragua earthquake may refer to:

- 1931 Nicaragua earthquake
- 1972 Nicaragua earthquake
- 1992 Nicaragua earthquake

== See also ==
- List of earthquakes in Nicaragua
