= Managua earthquake =

Managua earthquake may refer to:

- 1931 Nicaragua earthquake
- 1972 Nicaragua earthquake
- 2014 Nicaragua earthquake

== See also ==
- List of earthquakes in Nicaragua
