= 2012 El Salvador earthquake =

Earthquake and tsunami affeting Central America

- Location within Central America
- UTC time: 2012-08-27 04:37:19
- ISC event: 601626911
- USGS-ANSS: ComCat
- Local date: 26 August 2012
- Local time: 22:37 CST
- Magnitude: M_{w} 7.3
- Depth: 16.0 km (10 mi)
- Epicenter: 12.139°N 88.590°W
- Type: Thrust
- Areas affected: El Salvador and Nicaragua
- Max. intensity: MMI II (Weak)
- Tsunami: 6.32 m (21 ft)
- Foreshocks: Yes
- Aftershocks: Yes
- Casualties: 40 injured

A tsunamigenic earthquake occurred on 26 August 2012 at 22:37 CST with an epicenter off the coast of Usulután, El Salvador. It measured 7.3 on the moment magnitude scale (M_{w}) and had a focal depth of 16.0 kilometres (10 mi). It was felt along the country's coast and in San Salvador, although there was no damage. Along the San Juan del Gozo Peninsula, a tsunami triggered by the shock left 40 people injured. Waves were measured with a maximum run-up of 6.3 m (21 ft). The earthquake and tsunami was caused by a rupture on a subduction zone along the Middle America Trench.

== Tectonic setting ==
A convergent plate margin extends along the west coast of Central America where two tectonic plates collide. Oceanic lithosphere of the Cocos plate subducts beneath the continental crust of Central America. This continental crust is part of the Caribbean plate. Subduction occurs along the Middle America Trench, and the Cocos plate moves towards Central America at an estimated 8.23 ± 0.22 cm (3.240 ± 0.087 in) per year. The subduction zone is seismically active and has been responsible for large and tsunamigenic earthquakes when it ruptures. One of these large earthquakes affected Nicaragua in 1992, measuring M_{w} 7.6 and caused a destructive tsunami.

== Earthquake ==
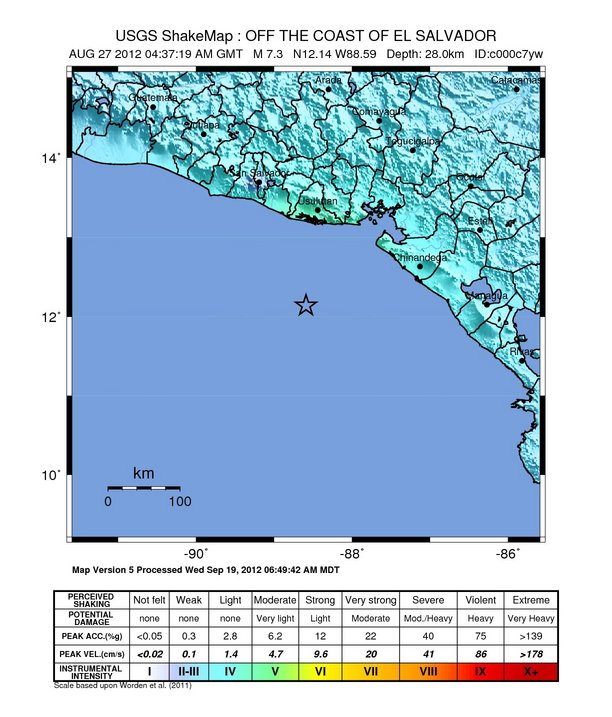
A USGS ShakeMap showing varying intensities of shaking caused by the earthquake

The earthquake occurred in the Pacific Ocean, more than 120 km (75 mi) south of El Salvador's Usulután department, on 26 August at 22:37 CST.

A 2013 study published in Earth and Planetary Science Letters determined that the earthquake ruptured a west–northwest striking, northeast dipping fault plane by applying seismic inversion on 83 broadband P-wave records. This rupture model corresponded to the shallow portion of the megathrust closest to the seafloor. The rupture extended along the megathrust from a depth of 23 km (14 mi) towards the trench and propagated through the fault at 2 km (1.2 mi) per second. The model determined that an approximately 50 km (31 mi) length of the megathrust produced slip of up to 1.2 m (3 ft 11 in). This event released energy slower and with a longer duration relative to the megathrust earthquakes of Guatemala and Costa Rica several months later; those exhibited a typical quick energy release. The study concluded that the El Salvador event displayed tsunami earthquake characteristic similar to the shock that affected Nicaragua in 1992.

Multiple eyewitnesses on the peninsula described the shaking as light. One compared it to a swaying boat lasting 30 to 40 seconds, another said suspended light fixtures swayed and corrugated metal roofing vibrated. A sea turtle hatchery worker at Corral de Mulas claimed the shaking persisted for two to three minutes. According to residents living in San Salvador, the earthquake was not perceived at all or it was felt weakly. Servicio Nacional de Estudios Territoriales evaluated the shaking in San Salvador to be II (Weak) on the Modified Mercalli intensity scale. Similarly, witnesses of the 1992 shock described weak shaking, a characteristic of tsunami earthquakes.

== Tsunami ==
Eight minutes after the earthquake, at 22:45, the Pacific Tsunami Warning Center (PTWC) issued an advisory along the Central American coasts. They evaluated the event as a slow earthquake at 22:47. Eleven minutes later, the PTWC raised their advisory to a tsunami warning after receiving strong evidence of its rupture characteristic. The warning was cancelled at 00:27 after there was no indication of significant damage. There was only two tide gauges at Acajutla and La Union; an amplitude of 14 cm (5.5 in) was recorded at the former location while no tsunami was detected on the latter gauge. No tide gauges were installed at the coast nearest to the epicenter. A 40 cm (16 in) tsunami was recorded at the Galapagos Islands three hours later. The tsunami impacted a sparsely populated part of the Salvadorian coast, while in Nicaragua, three coastal settlements experienced 0.5 m (1 ft 8 in) of flooding.

Along the coast of the San Juan del Gozo Peninsula, Usulután, close to the epicenter, the tsunami had greater coastal effects. Several conservationists were collecting sea turtle eggs along the beach when the tsunami struck. The Ministry of Natural Resources investigated 11 sites on the peninsula. These sites shared similar geomorphology; these beaches were steep-sloped and had black sand, atop the berm was a dune crest, and the terrain was relatively flat or slightly sloping beyond the berm. At a section of beach near La Maroma village, which hosted a sea turtle hatchery, the tsunami destroyed the walls of a ramada and tilted its wooden supports. A hatchery worker was carried by the tsunami for 90 m (300 ft) and left suspended on a tree, while another person was swept inland. A civil protection coordinator said 40 people at the beach were injured including three who required medical treatment. The ministry also found evidence that the tsunami flooded as far as 340 m (1,120 ft) inland.

A resident of El Retiro said two people and a horse were pulled down the beach by the tsunami. Another eyewitness in Corral de Mulas reported two waves with the second being the largest; they topped a fence post located 1 m (3 ft 3 in) above the dune crest and several meters inland. Tsunami overwash and inundation was evident in the area. Similarly, the tsunami scattered debris near the beaches of Ceiba Doblada. In other parts of Ceiba Doblada, the tsunami deposited sand onto the terrain. At Isla de Mendez, the tsunami had an estimated height of 6.32 m (20.7 ft) and penetrated 350 m (1,150 ft) inland. A 15 km (9.3 mi) stretch east and west of the area experienced 3–6 m (9.8–19.7 ft) tsunami waves. Some 25 km (16 mi) west, such as in the resort town of Costa del Sol, there was no damage.

== See also ==
- List of earthquakes in 2012
- List of earthquakes in El Salvador
- List of earthquakes in Nicaragua
