= April 2014 Nicaragua earthquake =

Earthquake in Central America

- Location within Central America
- UTC time: 2014-04-10 23:27:45
- ISC event: 604451431
- USGS-ANSS: ComCat
- Local date: April 10, 2014
- Local time: 17:27
- Magnitude: 6.1 M_{w}
- Depth: 13.0 km (8.1 mi)
- Epicenter: 12.403°N 86.378°W
- Areas affected: Nicaragua
- Total damage: 1,500 homes damaged
- Max. intensity: MMI VI (Strong)
- Casualties: 1 dead, 266 injured

The April 2014 Nicaragua earthquake occurred on April 10 at 17:27 local time. The earthquake hit about 50 kilometres (31 mi) north of the capital Managua. The shock measured 6.1 on the moment magnitude scale and had a maximum Mercalli intensity of VI (Strong).

The earthquake resulted in the death of one person and 266 injured. Over 1,500 houses were damaged, and tremors continued for many hours afterwards. The town of Nagarote and nearby villages in the León Region were the most affected by the earthquake.

In less than a day, another earthquake hit Nicaragua, this time near the city of Granada, at 3:29 local time. The second quake registered at a 6.6 magnitude, however, it did not result in any casualties.

== See also ==
- List of earthquakes in 2014
- List of earthquakes in Nicaragua
- Economy of Nicaragua
- Tourism in Nicaragua
- Types of earthquake
