= Types of earthquake =

This is a list of different types of earthquake.

== A ==
- Aftershock, a smaller earthquake that occurs after a previous large earthquake, in the same area of the main shock.

== B ==
- Blind thrust earthquake, an earthquake which occurs along a thrust fault that does not show signs on the Earth's surface.

== C ==
- Cryoseism, a seismic event that may be caused by a sudden cracking action in frozen soil or rock saturated with water or ice.

== D ==
- Deep-focus earthquake, an earthquake with a depth exceeding 300 kilometres (190 mi).
- Doublet earthquake, an earthquake that consists of at least two or more mainshocks of nearly identical magnitude, separated by a period of time.

== E ==
- Earthquake swarm, events where a local area experiences sequences of many earthquakes striking in a relatively short period of time.

== F ==
- Foreshock, an earthquake that occurs before a larger seismic event (the mainshock) and is related to it in both time and space.

== H ==
- Harmonic tremor, a sustained release of seismic and infrasonic energy typically associated with the underground movement of magma, the venting of volcanic gases from magma, or both.

== I ==
- Induced seismicity, typically minor earthquakes and tremors that are caused by human activity that alters the stresses and strains on the Earth's crust.
- Intermediate-depth earthquake, an earthquake that occurs in the depth range 70 km to 300 km.
- Interplate earthquake, an earthquake that occurs at the boundary between tectonic plates.
- Intraplate earthquake, an earthquake that occurs within the interior of a tectonic plate.

== M ==
- Megathrust earthquake, an earthquake occurring at subduction zones at destructive convergent plate boundaries, where one tectonic plate is forced underneath another.

== R ==
- Remotely triggered earthquakes, a result of the effects of other earthquakes at considerable distance, outside of the immediate aftershock zones.

== S ==
- Slow earthquake, a discontinuous, earthquake-like event that releases energy over a period of hours to months, rather than the seconds to minutes characteristic of a typical earthquake.
- Submarine earthquake, an earthquake that occurs underwater at the bottom of a body of water, especially an ocean.
- Supershear earthquake, an earthquake in which the propagation of the rupture along the fault surface occurs at speeds in excess of the seismic shear wave (S-wave) velocity, causing an effect analogous to a sonic boom.
- Strike-slip earthquake, an earthquake where two pieces of crust slide horizontally past each other.

== T ==
- Tsunami earthquake, an earthquake that triggers a tsunami of a magnitude that is very much larger than the magnitude of the earthquake as measured by shorter-period seismic waves.

== V ==
- Volcano tectonic earthquake, an earthquake induced by the movement (injection or withdrawal) of magma.
