= 1992 Nicaragua earthquake =

Earthquake and tsunami off the west coast of Nicaragua

- Location within Central America
- UTC time: 1992-09-02 00:16:01
- ISC event: 270936
- USGS-ANSS: ComCat
- Local date: 1 September 1992
- Local time: 18:16
- Magnitude: 7.7 M_{w}
- Depth: 44.8 km (27.8 mi)
- Epicenter: 11.742°N 87.340°W
- Fault: Cocos-Caribbean plate
- Type: Thrust
- Areas affected: Nicaragua
- Total damage: $20–30 million
- Max. intensity: MMI III (Weak)
- Tsunami: Yes
- Casualties: At least 116 killed by the tsunami

The 1992 Nicaragua earthquake occurred off the coast of Nicaragua at 6:16 p.m. on 1 September. Some damage was also reported in Costa Rica. At least 116 people were killed and several more were injured. The earthquake was caused by movement on a convergent plate boundary. It created a tsunami disproportionately large for its surface-wave magnitude.

== Tectonic setting ==
Nicaragua lies above the convergent boundary where the Cocos plate is being subducted beneath the Caribbean plate. The convergence rate across this boundary is about 73 mm per year. There have been many large earthquakes in this part of the plate boundary, including events in 1982, 2001, 2012 (El Salvador, Costa Rica and Guatemala) and 2014. The 2001 and 2014 events were a result of normal faulting within the subducting Cocos plate, with the others representing faulting along the plate interface.

== Earthquake ==
This event was the first tsunami earthquake to be recorded using modern broadband instruments. The initial surface-wave magnitude, which uses only waves of a period of 20 seconds, was estimated at 7.0–7.2. The part of the Middle America Trench off Nicaragua contains relatively little sediment, allowing the slip to propagate up-dip all the way to the trench bottom, which tends to generate large tsunamis. The trench sediment here has been subducted and this soft material lies along the plate interface. The rupture speed along such a zone is significantly slower than for most subduction zone thrust earthquakes, while the focus of the earthquake was much shallower than the typical subduction zone earthquake. Using longer period seismic waves, magnitudes have been calculated in the range 7.6–7.7 M_{w}, consistent with the size of the observed tsunami.

== Damage and casualties ==
The first shock of the earthquake occurred at 00:16 GMT and was followed by several strong aftershocks. The quake was most widely felt in the Chinandega and León departments of Nicaragua, though it was also felt elsewhere in Nicaragua at El Crucero, Managua and San Marcos and at San José in Costa Rica. It was the strongest seismic event to hit Nicaragua since the earthquake of 1972.

At least 116 people were killed, most being children sleeping in their beds, with more than 68 missing and over 13,500 left homeless in Nicaragua. At least 1,300 houses and 185 fishing boats were destroyed along the west coast of Nicaragua. Total damage in Nicaragua was estimated at between 20 and 30 million U.S. dollars.

According to the Augusto César Sandino Foundation, the most affected were "inhabitants of small poor communities who live from diverse subsistence activities. Their houses, located beside the sea, were almost entirely destroyed. These people have lost their livelihoods, poor peasants who grow basic grains for their own consumption in marginal areas, and fisherpeople who have lost their fishing equipment, boats, storage sheds and warehouses. Their already extreme poverty has been exacerbated."

== Tsunami ==
Most of the casualties and damage were caused by a tsunami affecting the west coasts of Nicaragua and Costa Rica, and it was one of three tsunamis to occur within a span of six months. Runup heights were measured shortly after the earthquake and reached heights of up to 9.9 meters, though the average height was 3 to 8 meters. The tsunami was disproportionately large for its surface wave magnitude, or M_{s}, and the duration of the rupture process was 100 s, unusually long for its size. The moment magnitude was 7.6, larger than the 20-second M_{s} of 7; this M_{s}–M_{w} difference is a characteristic of tsunami earthquakes. Tide gauges were set up at Corinto and Puerto Sandino, which showed an impulsive tsunami originating 61 minutes after the earthquake. It ran inland 1,000 meters to Masachapa, the hardest hit major town of all, with nine fatalities.

== Relief efforts ==
From the onset of the disaster, authorities provided initial assistance. President Violeta Chamorro stated in her speech to the nation on 2 September 1992, that no international assistance was needed. However, the Red Cross did assist in some operations while the National Civil Defence carried out much of the relief operations, with wounded people being transported to the Hospital Leon and Lenin-Fonseca Hospital.

== See also ==
- List of earthquakes in 1992
- List of earthquakes in Nicaragua
- 1896 Sanriku earthquake – another example of a tsunami earthquake
