= List of earthquakes in Costa Rica =

Notable earthquakes in the history of Costa Rica include the following:

Name	Date	Epicentre	Mag.	MM	Depth	Notes	Deaths
2017 Costa Rica earthquake	2017-11-13; 02:28:24 UTC	16 km south east of Jaco	6.5	VIII	19.8 km	All casualties caused by heart attacks.	3
	2012-10-24; 00:45:34 UTC	10.121001°N 85.314004°W; 13 km east-northeast of Hojancha	6.6	VII	20.1 km	Largest aftershock of the 2012 Costa Rica earthquake.	
2012 Costa Rica earthquake	2012-09-05; 14:42:10 UTC	10.119900°N 85.347000°W; 11 km east of Nicoya	7.6	X	40.8 km		2
2009 Cinchona earthquake	2009-01-08; 19:21:34 UTC	10.197°N 84.159°W; 30 km north of San José	6.1	VII	4.5 km		40
	2004-11-20; 08:07:21 UTC	9.581°N 84.228°W offshore	6.4		16 km		8
	1999-08-20; 10:02:21 UTC	9.04°N 84.15°W offshore	6.9		20 km		–
	1996-09-04		5.8				
1991 Limon earthquake	1991-04-22; 21:56:51 UTC	9.685°N 83.073°W; Limon-Pandora area	7.6	X	10 km	According to the USGS: "Forty-seven people killed, 109 injured, 7,439 homeless and severe damage (IX) in the Limon-Pandora area. Intensity X was observed in some zones of liquefaction within the epicentral area. 27 people killed, 454 injured, 2,400 homeless and 866 buildings destroyed (VII-VIII) in the Guabito-Almirante-Bocas del Toro area, Panama."	125
	1990-04-28		5.9				
	1990-03-25; 13:22:55 UTC	9.919°N 84.808°W; Entrance to the Gulf of Nicoya	7.0	VIII	22 km	Heavy damage (MM VIII) in the area of Puntarenas, some 60 buildings damaged (MM VII) in the San José area.	1
	1983-04-02	Golfito	7.2	VIII	26 km	Subduction of the Cocos plate under the Caribbean plate. Over 51 aftershocks reported with ML > 3,6.	1
	1974-02-28		5.8				
	1966-04-09		5.7				
1910 Costa Rica earthquakes	1910-05-04	Cartago	6.4				700
1822 Costa Rica earthquake	1822-05-07	near Caribbean Coast	7.6	IX			Unknown
Note: The inclusion criteria for adding events are based on WikiProject Earthquakes' notability guideline that was developed for stand alone articles. The principles described also apply to lists. In summary, only damaging, injurious, or deadly events should be recorded.

== See also ==
- Geology of Costa Rica
