= 2012 Constitución earthquake =

Earthquake in central Chile

- Location within Chile
- UTC time: 2012-03-25 22:37:06
- ISC event: 600841739
- USGS-ANSS: ComCat
- Local date: 25 March 2012
- Local time: 19:37 (UTC-4)
- Magnitude: 7.1 M_{w}
- Depth: 40.7 km (25.3 mi)
- Epicenter: 35.200°S 72.217°W
- Type: Thrust
- Areas affected: Chile
- Max. intensity: MMI VIII (Severe)
- Casualties: 1 dead

The 2012 Constitución earthquake was recorded on March 25, 2012, at 7:37 pm local time. It had a moment magnitude of 7.1 and its epicenter was located 23 km (14 mi) northeast of the city of Constitución, in the Maule Region, Chile. According to experts, it was a strong and late aftershock of the Great Chile earthquake of February 27, 2010.

The earthquake was felt from Coquimbo to the Los Lagos Region, with the Maule Region being the most affected and causing high commotion in the O'Higgins and Bio-bío regions, which were affected by the earthquake of 2010.

== Tectonic setting ==
The earthquake occurred as the result of shallow thrust faulting on or near the subduction interface between the Nazca and South American plates. At the location of this event, the Nazca plate moves east-northeast relative to South America at a velocity of about 74 mm/yr. The Nazca plate, oceanic in origin, subducts eastward beneath the South American plate at a shallow angle from the Peru-Chile Trench. It is seismically active to depths of approximately 200 km (124 mi) adjacent to the epicenter of the March 25th earthquake, though farther north seismicity continues to depths exceeding 600 km (370 mi).

In historical times the Chilean coast has suffered many megathrust earthquakes along this plate boundary, including the strongest earthquake ever measured, which is the 1960 Valdivia earthquake. More recently, the boundary ruptured during the 2015 Illapel earthquake in northern Chile.

== Earthquake ==
Modified Mercalli intensities in selected locations
| MMI | Locations |
| MMI VIII (Severe) | Cauquenes; Constitución; Pelluhue; Talca |
| MMI VII (Very strong) | Cobquecura; Parral; Pelarco; Villa Alegre |
| MMI VI (Strong) | Curicó; San Clemente |
| MMI V (Moderate) | Rancagua; Chillán |
| MMI IV (Light) | Santiago; Valparaíso; Mendoza |
| MMI III (Weak) | Buenos Aires; San Juan |

The earthquake occurred at 19:37 local time, having a maximum Mercalli intensity of VIII (Severe). The earthquake was felt in the Chilean capital Santiago with an MMI intensity of IV (Light). It was said to be an aftershock of the 2010 Chile earthquake.

== Impact ==
In the Maule Region, the most affected area was that of the city of Constitución, the closest to the epicenter. In the city, the earthquake destroyed a supermarket, and caused serious damage to a school, affecting 850 students. The earthquake also damaged the city's hospital. In addition, many residents were left without power or drinking water. About a thousand people evacuated from their homes to higher ground due to fear of a tsunami. In Talca, the capital of the region, the earthquake caused damage to several schools, resulting in classes being temporarily suspended. The city's mall was instantly evacuated by people, both visitors and local workers. In Parral, one person died from a heart attack. In Curicó, eight homes collapsed due to the earthquake.

Moderate damage was reported in the cities of Chillán, Concepción and Rancagua, where six homes were destroyed, two in O'Higgins, four in Ñuble and one in Lota.

In the cities of Valparaíso, Santiago, Temuco and Puerto Montt and smaller towns, the earthquake only caused only minor damage, however, the ceiling of a cinema collapsed and debris fell from the Votive Temple of Maipú.

== See also ==
- List of earthquakes in 2012
- List of earthquakes in Chile
