= 2012 Yiliang earthquakes =

Earthquakes in China

2012 Yunnan earthquakes
- Location within Yunnan
- UTC time: Multiplet earthquake: A: 2012-09-07 03:19:42; B: 2012-09-07 03:58:00; C: 2012-09-07 04:06:03; D: 2012-09-07 04:16:30; E: 2012-09-07 05:12:48
- ISC event: A: 601696464
- USGS-ANSS: A: ComCat; B: ComCat; C: ComCat; D: ComCat; E: ComCat
- Local date: 7 September 2012
- Local time: A: 11:19 CST; D: 04:16 CST
- Magnitude: Doublet earthquake: A: 5.5 M_{ww}; B: 4.8 mb; C: 4.2 mb; D: 5.3 M_{wc}; E: 4.7 mb
- Depth: A: 10.0 km (6.2 mi) B: 10.0 km (6.2 mi) C: 10.0 km (6.2 mi) D: 10.0 km (6.2 mi) E: 15.0 km (9.3 mi)
- Epicenter: 27.582°N 103.990°E
- Areas affected: China
- Casualties: 81 killed, 821 injured

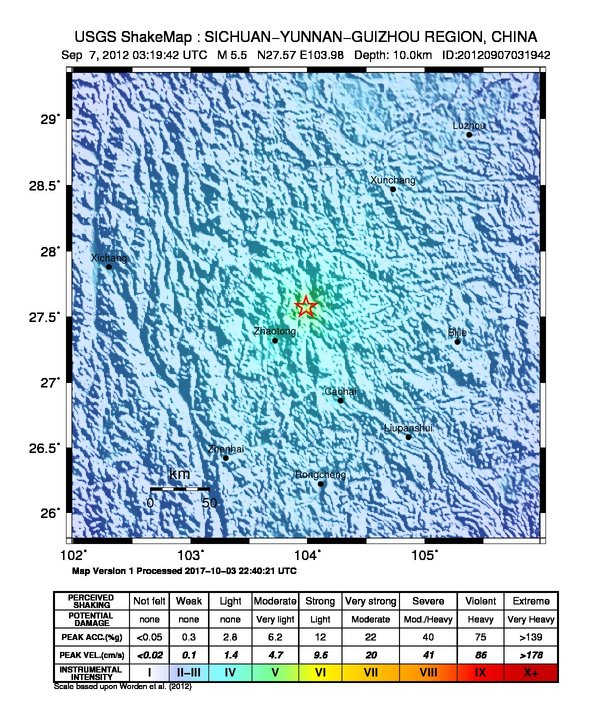
2012 Yiliang earthquake - intensity

On 7 September 2012, a series of earthquakes occurred in Yiliang County, Zhaotong, Yunnan. The two main shocks occurred at 11:19 and 12:16 China Standard Time (03:19 and 04:16 UTC). The earthquakes left 81 people dead and 821 injured. According to the officials, at least 100,000 people were evacuated and more than 20,000 houses were damaged.

== Earthquakes ==
There were two shocks with magnitudes exceeding 5, and they constituted an earthquake doublet.

Date	Time (UTC)	Magnitude	Latitude	Longitude	Depth
September 7, 2012	03:19	M_{w} 5.6	27.532°N	103.960°E	15.1 km
September 7, 2012	04:16	M_{w} 5.3	27.582°N	103.990°E	9.8 km

The two largest tremors were reported to be the major events in a sequence that included over 60 aftershocks. In addition to Yunnan and Guizhou, the shaking could be felt in Sichuan and Chongqing.

== Effects ==
The earthquakes caused landslides that blocked roads in the area of the hardest hit region, the town of Luozehe (洛泽河) in Yunnan Province, as well as cutting off utilities and communications. The affected areas are densely populated and mountainous.

Eighty-one people were killed, more than 800 people were injured, and more than 6,600 houses were flattened, while many thousands more were damaged. In neighbouring Guizhou Province, collapsed houses were reported in Weining County, and houses were damaged in Hezhang County. At least 30,265 households were left without power; 28,158 were restored by midday on 9 September 2012. Telecommunication in the affected area was restored roughly to the state before the earthquake by midday on 9 September 2012. Direct economic losses were estimated at 3.5 billion yuan (US$552 million).

In Zhaotong, 96 highways were cut off by the earthquake. According to the Communications Bureau of Zhaotong Prefecture, frequent aftershocks and landslides could cut off restored road access.

Premier Wen Jiabao flew to Yiliang and spoke to victims of the earthquakes. He also visited hospitals and tent settlements set up for the displaced.

== Relief efforts ==
The Red Cross has sent jackets, quilts, tents, rice, and cooking oil to the affected area. Sichuan Province sent medical personnel and ambulances to Yunnan for support. The central government of China allocated a fund of 1.05 billion yuan (US$165 million) on 8 September 2012 for relief and reconstruction.

== See also ==
- List of earthquakes in 2012
- List of earthquakes in Yunnan
- List of earthquakes in China

== Sources ==
- ANSS. "Sichuan 2012a: M 5.5 - Sichuan-Yunnan-Guizhou region, China". Comprehensive Catalog. U.S. Geological Survey.
- ANSS. "Sichuan 2012b". Comprehensive Catalog. U.S. Geological Survey.
- ANSS. "Sichuan 2012c". Comprehensive Catalog. U.S. Geological Survey.
- ANSS. "Sichuan 2012d". Comprehensive Catalog. U.S. Geological Survey.
- ANSS. "Sichuan 2012e". Comprehensive Catalog. U.S. Geological Survey.
- International Seismological Centre. ISC-EHB Bulletin. Thatcham, United Kingdom.
