= 2012 Zohan earthquake =

Earthquake in Iran

- Location within Iran
- UTC time: 2012-12-05 17:08:13
- ISC event: 601996088
- USGS-ANSS: ComCat
- Local date: December 5, 2012
- Local time: 20:38 IRST
- Magnitude: 5.8 M_{w}
- Depth: 14.4 km (8.9 mi)
- Epicenter: 33.490°N 59.554°E
- Areas affected: Iran
- Max. intensity: MMI VII (Very strong)
- Aftershocks: at least 12
- Casualties: 8 dead, 23 injured, 1 missing

The 2012 Zohan earthquake occurred on December 5 at 20:38 IRST with a moment magnitude of 5.8 and a maximum perceived intensity of VII (Very strong) on the Mercalli intensity scale. The shock occurred near the city of Zohan, Qayen and Birjand in South Khorasan province, Iran. It struck 42 km ESE from Qayen. At least 8 people were killed and 23 people were injured.

== See also ==
- List of earthquakes in 2012
- List of earthquakes in Iran
