= Norwalk/Nagarote Sister City Project =

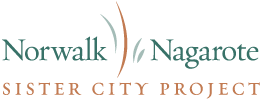
Logo of the Norwalk/Nagarote Sister City Project

The Norwalk/Nagarote Sister City Project (N/NSCP) is a partnership between the people of Nagarote, Nicaragua, and the Greater Norwalk Area of Connecticut, focusing on sustainable community development and breaking the cycle of poverty for the most disadvantaged children and youth in Nagarote.

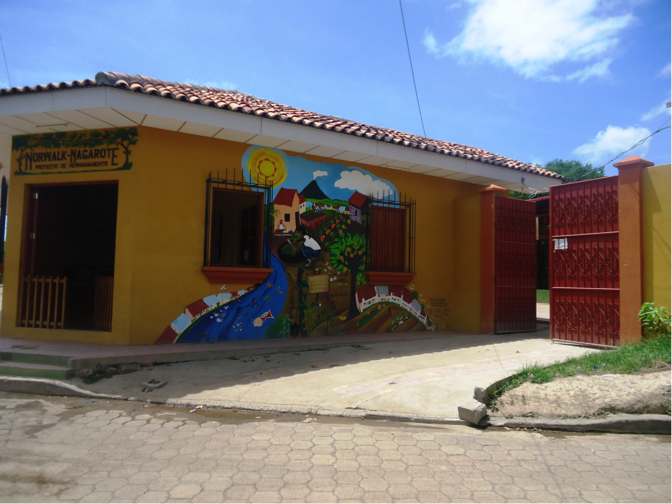
Photo of Norwalk/Nagarote Sister City Project community center in Nagarote, Nicaragua.

Since its founding in 1986, N/NSCP created Nagarote’s public library, provided an ambulance, built houses for hurricane victims, and provided relief after the earthquake of 2014. In 2003, the Project initiated its Youth Afterschool Program that offers classes in English, computers, sewing, theater, martial arts, sustainable farming and community service. In 2011, N/NSCP built a community center, classrooms and offices in Nagarote. In 2014, N/NSCP sponsored 82 scholarships for students from first grade through college; provided support for 52 students at the Jeronimo Lopez preschool; administered a Youth Afterschool Program to 167 at-risk teens; and ran an afterschool program for 98 children ages 6 to 11.

N/NSCP also operates a model sustainable farm in Nagarote which grows the fruits and vegetables used in their programs, and which also serves as a laboratory for classes on sustainable farming and environmental issues.

N/NSCP has a board of directors based in Norwalk, Connecticut, and an advisory board of local community leaders in Nagarote. The project is operated in Nagarote by a staff field director and approximately 20 full- and part-time local residents. N/NSCP is a 501(c)3.
