= 1677 Bōsō earthquake =

- Location within Japan
- Local date: November 4, 1677
- Local time: 20:00
- Magnitude: 8.3–8.6 M_{w}
- Epicenter: 35°N 141.5°E
- Fault: Japan Trench
- Type: Megathrust
- Max. intensity: JMA 4
- Tsunami: Yes
- Casualties: 569

The Bōsō Peninsula in Japan was struck by a major tsunami on 4 November 1677, caused by an earthquake at the southern end of the Japan Trench. It was felt onshore with only a maximum of 4 on the JMA intensity scale, but had an estimated magnitude of 8.3–8.6 M_{w}. The disparity between the maximum intensity and the magnitude estimated from the tsunami suggest that this was a tsunami earthquake. There no records of significant damage caused by the shaking, but the resulting tsunami caused widespread damage and an estimated 569 people were killed.

== See also ==
- List of earthquakes in Japan
- List of historical earthquakes
