= 1822 Costa Rica earthquake =

Earthquake in Latin America

- Location within Costa Rica
- Local date: 7 May 1822
- Magnitude: M_{s} 7.6
- Epicenter: 9.5°N 83.0°W
- Max. intensity: MMI IX (Violent)
- Tsunami: Yes
- Casualties: Unknown

The 1822 Costa Rica earthquake had an estimated surface-wave magnitude of 7.5–7.6 and struck the nation's Caribbean coast. The earthquake largely affected the country's east coast and generated a tsunami. Thrust faulting was inferred as a plausible mechanism for the earthquake and its damage pattern was similar to a 1991 shock of similar magnitude. Damage was also recorded in neighbouring countries.

== Tectonic setting ==
At the west coast of Costa Rica, the east-moving Cocos Plate subducts beneath the Caribbean Plate which the country is situated on. Ongoing subduction occurs at the Middle America Trench where the subduction rate varies between 70 mm (2.8 in) and 95 mm (3.7 in) annually from Guatamela to Costa Rica. The Panama block, a microplate, lies southeast of the country; its boundary with the Caribbean Plate, the Panama Thrust Bent, is a destructive plate boundary that stretches from Colombia to Limon, near the east coast of Costa Rica. In Costa Rica, the Panama Thrust Bent causes the Caribbean Plate to underthrust beneath the Cordillera de Talamanca. A study of aftershocks following the 1991 shock suggests a near horizontal décollement at 15 km (9.3 mi) depth with steeper splays branching from the base to the surface. The northwesternmost boundary of the Panama Block is a northwest–southeast striking left-lateral fault system.

== Earthquake ==
The presence of tsunami observations along the Caribbean coast suggests possible reverse-faulting associated with the shock. A surface-wave magnitude of 7.5–7.6 and possibly larger was inferred from isoseismal information for the felt area of Modified Mercalli intensity VI (Strong). The isoseismal information also indicated a probable epicenter near the Caribbean coast. The Modified Mercalli intensity at the epicenter area was estimated at IX (Violent). Damage was severe in the central and western part of the country, and in eastern Panama. Coastal uplift was also reported in Panama. Damage patterns and observed uplift were similar to another earthquake in 1991; the 1822 earthquake has been suggested to have ruptured the same area of the back-arc region.

== Effects ==
Three distinct "shocks" were reported in Matina; deep fissures appeared in the ground and ejected black sand and water. Severe inundation also occurred along rivers. Destruction in Cartago was reported as near total. Houses and walls in the city were damaged; the San Miguel Hospital was severely affected and officials had to demolish barracks, parishes and the Church and convent of San Francisco. Damage was also reported in Panama and Nicaragua. Among the affected infrastructure of San José was the city's tobacco factory. A Scottish merchant in the area documented swaying trees and frightened wildlife during the earthquake.

An unknown number of people died and were injured in the country's central valley region. The earthquake struck Costa Rica during a period of unrest in the country which recently gained independence the year prior. Residents and those in power interpreted the earthquake as a sign for society sought order and resolution. In Cartago, residents helped in restoring the city. Reconstruction and post-disaster assistance continued until 1829.

Reports of a tsunami in Bocas del Toro between 1820 and 1830 may correspond to the tsunami of 7 May 1822. A historic document also described "rivers and bay grew and caused floods"; flooding and "bay grew" may be interpreted as the tsunami causing a flood. The reports of liquefaction and tsunami were also compared with the 1991 earthquake.

== See also ==
- List of earthquakes in Costa Rica
