= 2012 Afghanistan earthquakes =

Earthquakes in Afghanistan in 2012

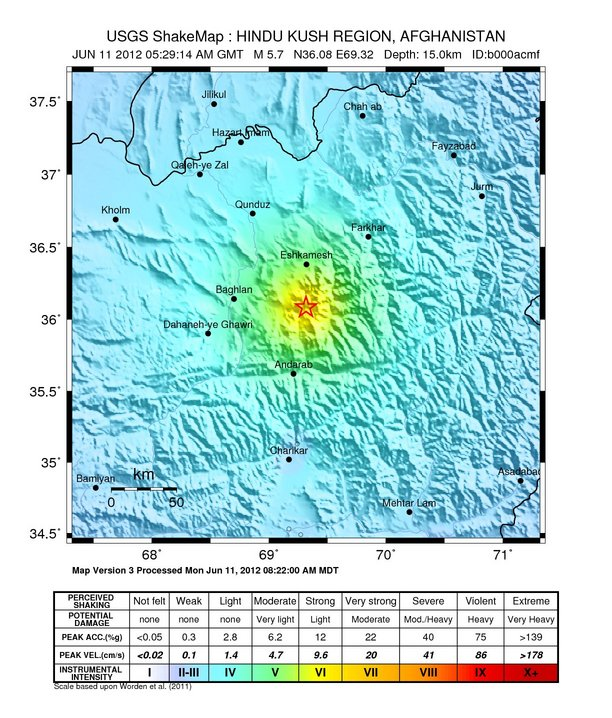

- Location within Afghanistan
- UTC time: Doublet earthquake:
- A: 2012-06-11 05:02:14
- B: 2012-06-11 05:29:11
- ISC event
- A: 601474949
- B: 601112970
- USGS-ANSS
- A: ComCat
- B: ComCat
- Local date: 11 June 2012
- Local time
- A: 9:32 a.m.
- B: 9:57 a.m.
- Magnitude
- A: 5.4 mb
- B: 5.7 M_{ww}
- Depth: A: 29 km (18 mi); B: 16 km (10 mi)
- Epicenter: A: 36.039°N 69.401°E; B: 36.023°N 69.351°E
- Areas affected: Afghanistan
- Total damage: Hundreds of buildings destroyed
- Max. intensity: MMI V (Moderate)
- Landslides: Yes
- Casualties: 75 killed, 13 injured

On 11 June 2012, two moderate earthquakes struck northern Afghanistan, causing a large landslide. The landslide buried the town of Sayi Hazara, trapping 71 people. After four days of digging, only five bodies were recovered and the search was called off. Overall, 75 people were killed and 13 others were injured.

== Tectonic setting ==
Afghanistan is situated within the broad and complex zone of collision between the Arabian plate, the Indian plate and the Eurasian plate. The western part of the country is subdivided into the North Afghan Platform to the north and a series of accreted terranes to the south. The North Afghan Platform has remained relatively tectonically stable since the Variscan Orogeny during the Late Palaeozoic, when it became part of Eurasia. To the south there is a collage of continental fragments and magmatic arcs that have been progressively accreted, particularly in the Mesozoic period. The boundary between these two crustal areas is the major right-lateral strike-slip Harirud (or Herat) Fault, which is far less seismically active than the Chaman Fault that runs through the east of the country. To the north of the Harirud Fault, the near parallel Band-e Turkestan Fault does show signs of recent activity, also in a right-lateral sense.

== Earthquakes ==
The first earthquake struck at 09:32 local time (05:02 UTC), registering a magnitude of 5.4 at 15 kilometres (9.3 mi) depth. A second quake struck 25 minutes later, measuring 5.7 magnitude. The epicenter of both quakes was approximately 160 kilometres (99 mi) southwest of Fayzabad. The quakes could be felt 170 kilometres (110 mi) away in the capital of Kabul.

== Damage ==
The quakes caused a large portion of a mountain in the Hindu Kush region to break off. An estimated, one hectare of land was covered in up to 100 metres (330 ft) of debris by the landslide in the Burka District of Baghlan Province. The village of Sayi Hazara was hardest hit, buried under 30 to 100 meters of rock from the landslide.

== Rescue efforts ==
According to Baghlan provincial governor Munshi Majeed, Sayi Hazara was completely destroyed by the landslide. He said there was little hope in finding any survivors in the 23 homes buried when a large portion of the nearby mountain broke free and inundated the village. Only one home survived. Rescue workers worked throughout 11 June and into the night, but heard no human noises. Baghlan Provincial Council member Haji Wakil told reporters, "The mountain was too big and strong... There is silence and silence alone." Majeed added, "This is a human tragedy. An entire village was lost... Two bulldozers are now there to recover the dead bodies but the amount of stones and debris that has hit the village makes the chances of survivors very slim." At the time of the earthquake, most adult males were away from the village working farmland, so the victims are mostly women and children. As of 13 June, only two bodies had been recovered. "We have to dig and find the 69 other bodies," said provincial spokesperson Mahmood Haqmal. "It is not an easy task, but the government has promised that they... will stay until they find the last bodies."

On 14 June, the search was called off after only five bodies were recovered. The government said the area would be turned into a permanent memorial for the 66 people whose bodies were not found. Religious leaders recommended the area be renamed "Martyrs Hill" in honor of the dead. In total, more than 800 people helped with rescue efforts before the search was ended.

In addition to Sayi Hazara, four other areas, across three districts, in Baghlan Province reported damage. In Nahrin district, three people were killed, while in Guzargahi Nur, one person lost his life. The United Nations and the Afghan Red Crescent Society have sent humanitarian aid to the area.

== See also ==
- List of earthquakes in 2012
- List of earthquakes in Afghanistan
