= 2000 Nicaragua earthquake =

Earthquake in Nicaragua

- Location within Central America
- UTC time: 2000-07-06 19:30:20
- ISC event: 1747177
- USGS-ANSS: ComCat
- Local date: July 6, 2000
- Local time: 1:30 pm
- Magnitude: 5.4 M_{w}
- Depth: 33 kilometres (21 mi)
- Epicenter: 11.884°N 85.988°W
- Type: Strike-slip
- Areas affected: Masaya, Nicaragua
- Max. intensity: MMI VIII (Severe)
- Casualties: 7 dead, 42 injured

The 2000 Nicaragua earthquake occurred at 19:30 UTC on July 6. It had a magnitude of 5.4 on the moment magnitude scale and caused 7 deaths and 42 injuries. 357 houses were destroyed and 1,130 others were damaged in the earthquake.

== Tectonic setting ==
The Pacific coast of Nicaragua lies above the convergent plate boundary where the Cocos plate is subducting beneath the Caribbean plate, at a rate of 83 mm per year. The direction of convergence is significantly oblique to the plate boundary, leading to an element of left lateral strike-slip movement within the overriding plate. Unlike the obliquely convergent boundary in Sumatra, where the strike-slip element is accommodated by displacement along the trench parallel Great Sumatran fault, no major NW-SE trending fault structure is known in Nicaragua. The most commonly mapped faults are SW-NE trending left lateral in type. The focal mechanisms of earthquakes in this part of Nicaragua are consistent with both orientations of faulting, due to the ambiguity inherent in interpreting the active fault planes for strike-slip events. The SW-NE faulting is thought to represent so-called "bookshelf faulting", which accommodates the oblique movement along the plate boundary, combined with clockwise rotation of the intervening blocks.

== Earthquake ==
The earthquake was preceded by a magnitude 2.0 foreshock, occurring one minute earlier. The mainshock was followed by many aftershocks, including a magnitude 5.2 event on July 7. The aftershocks had almost died away when, on July 25, a magnitude 4.8 earthquake occurred to the northwest of the July 6 event, with its own short aftershock sequence. The mainshock had a focal mechanism consistent with left lateral faulting on a fault plane striking SSW-NNE and dipping steeply to the ESE. Surface ruptures associated with this earthquake sequence near Laguna de Apoyo and Masaya were mainly orientated SW-NE matching the inferred fault orientation. The perceived shaking reached between VII to VIII on the Mercalli intensity scale close to Laguna de Apoyo and up to VI in Managua and Masaya.

== Damage ==
The mainshock caused widespread damage in the epicentral area, particularly near the northern rim of Laguna de Apoyo, causing the deaths of 7 people and injuring another 42. A total of 357 houses were destroyed with a further 1,130 damaged by the earthquake. Most of the houses in the affected area were of poor construction, typical for rural parts of Nicaragua. The strongest of the aftershocks caused further damage due to their shallow focal depth.

The shaking caused many landslides, particularly on the slopes of the Laguna de Apoyo crater walls.

== See also ==
- List of earthquakes in 2000
- List of earthquakes in Nicaragua
