= 2012 Sanriku earthquake =

Earthquake in Japan

- 三陸沖地震
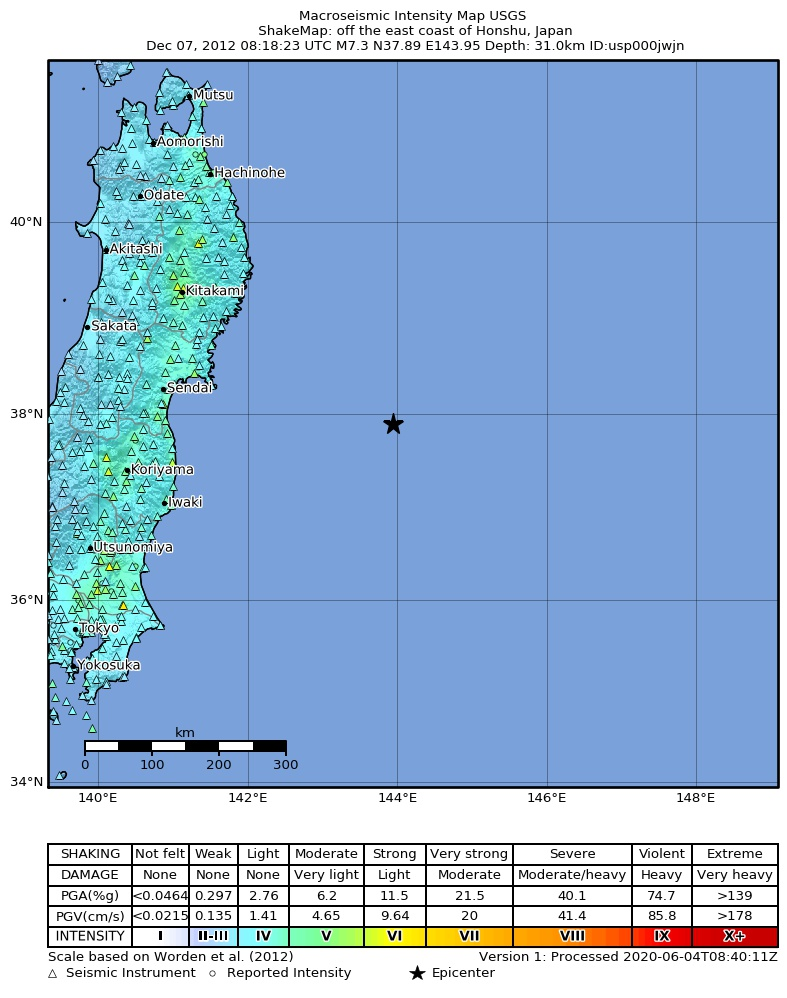

- Location within Japan
- UTC time: 2012-12-07 08:18:23
- ISC event: 607215270
- USGS-ANSS: ComCat
- Local date: December 7, 2012
- Local time: 17:18:23
- Duration: about 1 minute
- Magnitude: 7.3 M_{w}
- Depth: 31.0 km (19 mi)
- Epicenter: 37.890°N 143.949°E
- Type: Reverse fault
- Areas affected: Japan
- Max. intensity: MMI V (Moderate) JMA 5−
- Tsunami: 1.0 m (3.3 ft) in Ishinomaki, Miyagi
- Casualties: 3 dead, 14 injured

The 2012 Sanriku earthquake (三陸沖地震, Sanriku oki jishin) occurred near the city of Kamaishi, Japan, on December 7 at 17:18 JST. The magnitude 7.3 shock generated a small tsunami, with waves up to 1 m high, that hit Ishinomaki in Miyagi Prefecture. It occurred at a depth of 36 km within the Pacific plate and was the result of reverse faulting, about 20 kilometres (12 mi) east of the Japan Trench.

== Damage ==
=== Tsunami ===
The 1 metre (3.3 ft) tsunami caused a mountain of sandbags to collapse in Ishinomaki. An old man went missing and was found dead on December 14 after he sailed out to sea to try to evacuate from the tsunami in Kuji.

=== Shaking ===
Some pipeworks were damaged in an old people's facility in Saitama. Some boards in a roof of an elementary school in Ichikai shifted. An elderly lady died of shock at her home in Marumori, and a man died of shock after trying to evacuate from where he was working in Iitate, causing a total of 3 deaths. This earthquake also caused 14 injuries.

== Previous earthquakes in Kamaishi ==
In 2001 and 2008, there were a series of micro earthquakes that could have started the tectonic plate movement that triggered the 2012 Kamaishi earthquake. These small series of earthquakes were a magnitude of about 3–4.9. According to studies, the shocks moved from the outer and deeper limits into the mainshock epicenter. These small earthquakes were a precursor that began the tectonic movement for the 2012 earthquake.

== See also ==
- List of earthquakes in 2012
- List of earthquakes in Japan
