= Episodic tremor and slip =

Seismological phenomenon observed in some subduction zones

Episodic tremor and slip (ETS) is a seismological phenomenon observed in some subduction zones that is characterized by non-earthquake seismic rumbling, or tremor, and slow slip along the plate interface. Slow slip events are distinguished from earthquakes by their propagation speed and focus. In slow slip events, there is an apparent reversal of crustal motion, although the fault motion remains consistent with the direction of subduction. ETS events themselves are imperceptible to human beings and do not cause damage.

== Discovery ==
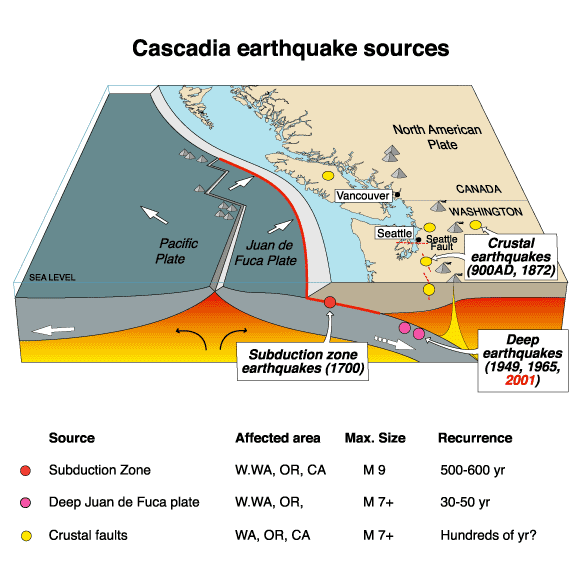
Structure of the Cascadia subduction zone. The Juan de Fuca plate is subducting northeastward under the North American plate.

Nonvolcanic, episodic tremor was first identified in southwest Japan in 2002. Shortly afterwards, the Geological Survey of Canada coined the term "episodic tremor and slip" to characterize observations of GPS measurements in the Vancouver Island area. Vancouver Island lies in the eastern, North American region of the Cascadia subduction zone. ETS events in Cascadia were observed to reoccur cyclically with a period of approximately 14 months. Analysis of measurements led to the successful prediction of ETS events in following years (e.g., 2003, 2004, 2005, and 2007). In Cascadia, these events are marked by about two weeks of 1 to 10 Hz seismic trembling and non-earthquake ("aseismic") slip on the plate boundary equivalent to a magnitude 7 earthquake. (Tremor is a weak seismological signal only detectable by very sensitive seismometers.) Recent episodes of tremor and slip in the Cascadia region have occurred down-dip of the region ruptured in the 1700 Cascadia earthquake.

Since the initial discovery of this seismic mode in the Cascadia region, slow slip and tremor have been detected in other subduction zones around the world, including Japan and Mexico. Slow slip is not accompanied by tremor in the Hikurangi Subduction Zone.

Every five years a year-long quake of this type occurs beneath the New Zealand capital, Wellington. It was first measured in 2003, and has reappeared in 2008 and 2013.

== Characteristics ==
=== Slip behaviour ===
GPS measurements from Victoria, British Columbia show periodic reversals in crustal deformation in the North American region of the Cascadia subduction zone.

In the Cascadia subduction zone, the Juan de Fuca plate, a relic of the ancient Farallon plate, is actively subducting eastward underneath the North American plate. The boundary between the Juan de Fuca and North American plates is generally "locked" due to interplate friction. A GPS marker on the surface of the North American plate above the locked region will trend eastward as it is dragged by the subduction process. Geodetic measurements show periodic reversals in the motion (i.e., westward movement) of the overthrusting North American plate. During these reversals, the GPS marker will be displaced to the west over a period of days to weeks. Because these events occur over a much longer duration than earthquakes, they are termed "slow slip events".

Slow slip events have been observed to occur in the Cascadia, Japan, and Mexico subduction zones. Unique characteristics of slow slip events include periodicity on timescales of months to years, focus near or down-dip of the locked zone, and along-strike propagation of 5 to 15 km/d. In contrast, a typical earthquake rupture velocity is 70 to 90% of the S wave velocity, or approximately 3.5 km/s.

Because slow slip events occur in subduction zones, their relationship to megathrust earthquakes is of economic, human, and scientific importance. The seismic hazard posed by ETS events is dependent on their focus. If the slow slip event extends into the seismogenic zone, accumulated stress would be released, decreasing the risk of a catastrophic earthquake. However, if the slow slip event occurs down-dip of the seismogenic zone, it may "load" the region with stress. The probability of a great earthquake (moment magnitude scale $M_w \geq 8.0$) occurring has been suggested to be 30 times greater during an ETS event than otherwise, but more recent observations have shown this theory to be simplistic. One factor is that tremor occurs in many segments at different times along the plate boundary; another factor is that rarely have tremor and large earthquakes been observed to correlate in timing.

=== Tremor ===
Slow slip events are frequently linked to non-volcanic seismological "rumbling", or tremor. Tremor is distinguished from earthquakes in several key respects: frequency, duration, and origin. Seismic waves generated by earthquakes are high-frequency and short-lived. These characteristics allow seismologists to determine the hypocentre of an earthquake using first-arrival methods. In contrast, tremor signals are weak and extended in duration. Furthermore, while earthquakes are caused by the rupture of faults, tremor is generally attributed to underground movement of fluids (magmatic or hydrothermal). As well as in subduction zones, tremor has been detected in transform faults such as the San Andreas.

In both the Cascadia and Nankai subduction zones, slow slip events are directly associated with tremor. In the Cascadia subduction zone, slip events and seismological tremor signals are spatially and temporally coincident, but this relationship does not extend to the Mexican subduction zone. Furthermore, this association is not an intrinsic characteristic of slow slip events. In the Hikurangi Subduction Zone, New Zealand, episodic slip events are associated with distinct, reverse-faulted microearthquakes.

Two types of tremor have been identified: one associated with geodetic deformation (as described above), and one associated with 5 to 10 second bursts excited by distant earthquakes. The second type of tremor has been detected worldwide; for example, it has been triggered in the San Andreas Fault by the 2002 Denali earthquake and in Taiwan by the 2001 Kunlun earthquake.

== Geological interpretation ==
Tremor is commonly associated with the underground movement of magmatic or hydrothermal fluids. As a plate is subducted into the mantle, it loses water from its porespace and due to phase changes of hydrous minerals (such as amphibole). It has been proposed that this liberation of water generates a supercritical fluid at the plate interface, lubricating plate motion. This supercritical fluid may open fractures in the surrounding rock, and that tremor is the seismological signal of this process. Mathematical modelling has successfully reproduced the periodicity of episodic tremor and slip in the Cascadia region by incorporating this dehydration effect. In this interpretation, tremor may be enhanced where the subducting oceanic crust is young, hot, and wet as opposed to older and colder.

However, alternative models have also been proposed. Tremor has been demonstrated to be influenced by tides or variable fluid flow through a fixed volume. Tremor has also been attributed to shear slip at the plate interface. Recent contributions in mathematical modelling reproduce the sequences of Cascadia and Hikurangi (New Zealand), and suggest in-situ dehydration as the cause for the episodic tremor and slip events.

== See also ==
- Geodynamics
- Plate tectonics
- Seismology
- Slow earthquake
