= List of earthquakes in 2012 =

Earthquakes in 2012
Approximate epicenters of notable earthquakes in 2012
- 4.0–5.9 magnitude
- 6.0–6.9 magnitude
- 7.0–7.9 magnitude
- 8.0+ magnitude
- Strongest: 8.6 M_{w}Indonesia
- Deadliest: 6.4 M_{w}Iran; 304 deaths
- Total fatalities: 826

Number by magnitude
- 9.0+: 0
- 8.0–8.9: 2
- 7.0–7.9: 15
- 6.0–6.9: 129
- 5.0–5.9: 1,412

This is a list of earthquakes in 2012. Only earthquakes of magnitude 6 or above are included, unless they result in damage or casualties, or are notable for some other reason. All dates are listed according to UTC time. Two huge 8 magnitude earthquakes (8.6 and 8.2) struck Indonesia in April, but caused little damage, and no tsunami. The deadliest quake occurred in Iran, while other destructive tremors were observed in Guatemala, Philippines, and China.

== Compared to other years ==
Number of earthquakes worldwide for 2002–2012 []
Magnitude	2002	2003	2004	2005	2006	2007	2008	2009	2010	2011	2012
8.0–9.9	0	1	2	1	2	4	1	1	1	1	2
7.0–7.9	13	14	14	10	9	14	12	16	23	19	15
6.0–6.9	126	139	141	139	142	178	167	143	150	187	117
5.0–5.9	1,170	1,212	1,511	1,694	1,726	2,090	1,786	1,912	2,222	2,494	1,565
4.0–4.9	8,479	8,455	10,880	13,893	12,843	12,081	12,294	6,817	10,135	13,130	10,955
Total	9,788	9,823	12,551	15,738	14,723	14,367	14,261	8,891	12,536	15,831	12,660

== Overall ==
=== By death toll ===
Rank	Death toll	Magnitude	Location	MMI	Depth (km)	Date
1	306	6.4	Iran, East Azerbaijan	VIII (Severe)	11.0	August 11
2	139	7.4	Guatemala, Retalhuleu offshore	VII (Very strong)	41.6	November 7
3	113	6.7	Philippines, Central Visayas	VII (Very strong)	11.0	February 6
4	81	5.6	China, Yunnan	VI (Strong)	9.9	September 7
5	75	5.7	Afghanistan, Baghlan	V (Moderate)	15.0	June 11
6	38	6.8	Myanmar, Sagaing	VII (Very strong)	9.8	November 11
7	27	5.8	Italy, Emilia-Romagna	VIII (Severe)	9.0	May 29
8	10	8.6	Indonesia, Aceh offshore	VII (Very strong)	22.9	April 11

- Note: At least 10 casualties

=== By magnitude ===
Rank	Magnitude	Death toll	Location	Intensity	Depth (km)	Date
1	8.6	10	Indonesia, Aceh offshore	VII (Very Strong)	20.0	April 11
2	8.2	0	Indonesia, Aceh offshore	V (Moderate)	25.1	April 11
3	7.8	1	Canada, British Columbia	V (Moderate)	14.0	October 28
4	7.7	0	Russia, Sea of Okhotsk	V (Moderate)	625.9	August 14
5	7.6	1	Philippines, Eastern Visayas offshore	VII (Very Strong)	28.0	August 31
5	7.6	2	Costa Rica, Guanacaste	X (Extreme)	35.0	September 5
7	7.4	2	Mexico, Oaxaca	VIII (Severe)	20.0	March 20
7	7.4	139	Guatemala, Retalhuleu	VII (Very Strong)	24.0	November 7
9	7.3	0	El Salvador, Usulután offshore	II (Weak)	28.0	August 27
9	7.3	0	Colombia, Huila	V (Moderate)	170.0	September 30
9	7.3	3	Japan, Iwate offshore	V (Moderate)	31.0	December 7
12	7.2	0	Indonesia, Aceh offshore	IV (Light)	19.0	January 11
13	7.1	0	Vanuatu, Shefa	V (Moderate)	23.0	February 2
13	7.1	1	Chile, Maule	VIII (Severe)	40.7	March 25
13	7.1	0	Indonesia, Banda Sea offshore	V (Moderate)	155.0	December 10
16	7.0	0	Mexico, Baja California offshore	VI (Strong)	13.0	April 12

- Note: At least 7.0 magnitude

== By month ==
=== January ===
January
- Strongest: 7.2 M_{w} Indonesia
- Deadliest: 5.5 M_{w} Dominican Republic; 1 death
- Total fatalities: 1

Number by magnitude
- 9.0+: 0
- 8.0–8.9: 0
- 7.0–7.9: 1
- 6.0–6.9: 9
- 5.0–5.9: 163

Date	Country and location	M_{w}	Depth (km)	MMI	Notes	Casualties	
Date	Country and location	M_{w}	Depth (km)	MMI	Notes	Dead	Injured
1	Japan, Izu Islands offshore	6.8	365.3	V	-	-	-
5	Dominican Republic, Peravia, 5 km (3.1 mi) north northwest of Baní	5.5	39.8	V	One person died of a heart attack and minor damage in Santo Domingo.	1	-
9	Solomon Islands, Temotu offshore, 70 km (43 mi) west of Lata	6.4	28.0	VI	-	-	-
10	Indonesia, Aceh offshore, 352 km (219 mi) west of Sinabang	7.2	19.0	IV	Foreshock of the 2012 Indian Ocean earthquakes.	-	-
15	Antarctica, South Shetland Islands offshore	6.6	8.0	-	-	-	-
19	Iran, Razavi Khorasan, 9 km (5.6 mi) north northeast of Nishapur	5.1	8.3	VI	At least 238 people injured and minor damage in Razavi Khorasan province.	-	238
21	Mexico, Chiapas offshore, 46 km (29 mi) southwest of El Arenal	6.2	45.0	VI	-	-	-
23	Chile, Biobío, 24 km (15 mi) north northwest of Tomé	6.1	20.0	VI	-	-	-
27	Japan, Yamanashi, 9 km (5.6 mi) east northeast of Fujiyoshida	5.2	36.3	IV	One person injured in Tokyo.	-	1
30	Peru, Ica, 6 km (3.7 mi) east southeast of Pampa de Tate	6.4	43.0	VI	At least 119 people injured and several buildings damaged in Ica.	-	119

=== February ===
February
- Strongest: 7.1 M_{w} Vanuatu
- Deadliest: 6.7 M_{w} Philippines; 113 deaths
- Total fatalities: 113

Number by magnitude
- 7.0–7.9: 1
- 6.0–6.9: 8
- 5.0–5.9: 185

Date	Country and location	M_{w}	Depth (km)	MMI	Notes	Casualties	
Date	Country and location	M_{w}	Depth (km)	MMI	Notes	Dead	Injured
1	Indonesia, Bengkulu offshore, 15 km (9.3 mi) north northwest of Bengkulu	5.4	80.3	V	The roofs of some houses collapsed in Bengkulu.	-	-
2	Vanuatu, Shefa offshore, 125 km (78 mi) west of Port Vila	7.1	23.0	V	-	-	-
3	Vanuatu, 116 km WNW of Port-Vila	6.1	18.0	-	-	-	-
5	Vanuatu, 81 km WSW of Isangel	6.1	145.0	-	-	-	-
5	Vanuatu, 117 km WSW of Port-Vila	6.1	8.0	-	-	-	-
6	Philippines, near the islands of Negros and Cebu	6.7	11.0	VII	Further information: 2012 Negros earthquake	113	112
6	Philippines, near the island of Negros	6.0	9.0	VII	Aftershock of the 2012 Negros earthquake.	-	-
14	Solomon Islands, near Kirakira	6.4	51.0	V	-	-	-
26	Fiji, South of the Fiji Islands	6.0	10.0	-	-	-	-
26	Russia, southwestern Siberia	6.7	11.7	VII	-	-	-

=== March ===
March
- Strongest: 7.4 M_{w}, Mexico
- Total fatalities: 4

Number by magnitude
- 7.0–7.9: 2
- 6.0–6.9: 11
- 5.0–5.9: 116

- A magnitude 6.6 earthquake struck off New Caledonia on the March 3, at a depth of 15.2 km.
- (Argentina) A magnitude 6.1 earthquake struck northern Sasowa, near Añatuya, on March 5, at a depth of 550 km.
- A magnitude 6.7 earthquake struck Vanuatu, near Isangel, on March 9, at a depth of 31.7 km.
- A magnitude 6.9 earthquake struck near Kushiro, Hokkaido, Japan, on March 14, at a depth of 26.6 km.
- A magnitude 6.0 earthquake struck offshore Chiba Prefecture, Japan, on March 14, at a depth of 10 km. One person died of a heart attack.
- A magnitude 6.2 earthquake struck Papua New Guinea, near Kimbe, New Britain, on March 14, at a depth of 47.8 km.
- A magnitude 6.2 earthquake struck near Abepura, Indonesia, on March 20, at a depth of 67 km.
- A magnitude 7.4 earthquake struck Oaxaca, Mexico, on March 20, at a depth of 20 km, killing 2 people.
- A magnitude 6.6 earthquake struck New Guinea, Papua New Guinea on March 21, at a depth of 105.9 km.
- A magnitude 7.1 earthquake hit Chile, near Talca, on March 25, at a depth of 34.8 km. One person died of a heart attack.
- (France) A magnitude 6.0 earthquake struck maritime territory of Mexico, between Acapulco and Clipperton Island, on March 26, at a depth of 9 km.
- A magnitude 6.0 earthquake hit near the east coast of Honshū Japan, on March 27, at a depth of 10 km.

=== April ===
April
- Strongest: 8.6 M_{w}, Indonesia
- Total fatalities: 11

Number by magnitude
- 8.0–8.9: 2
- 7.0–7.9: 0
- 6.0–6.9: 17
- 5.0–5.9: 165

- A magnitude 6.0 earthquake struck near Cuajinicuilapa, Mexico on April 2, at a depth of 9.1 km.
- A magnitude 6.2 earthquake struck Papua New Guinea, near Taron, on April 6, at a depth of 85.4 km.
- A magnitude 8.6 earthquake hit Indonesia, off northern Sumatra, on April 11 at a depth of 20 km followed by several aftershocks including an 8.2. Ten people were killed and several others injured.
- A magnitude 6.0 earthquake struck near the southeast coast of Taiwan on April 11 at a depth of 10 km.
- A magnitude 6.5 earthquake hit Mexico, near Michoacán, on April 11, at a depth of 20 km.
- A magnitude 6.2 struck Baja California, Mexico on April 12 followed by a strong aftershock of 6.9.
- A magnitude 6.2 earthquake hit Drake Passage, near Argentina and Chile, on April 14, at a depth of 9.9 km.
- A magnitude 6.5 earthquake struck near Isangel, Vanuatu, on April 14 at a depth of 8.0 km.
- A magnitude 6.2 struck off the coast of Sumatra, Indonesia, on April 15 at a depth of 15.2 km.
- A magnitude 6.7 earthquake struck Chile, near Valparaíso, on April 17, at a depth of 37 km. One person died of a heart attack and another due to the loss of power at a local hospital.
- A magnitude 6.8 earthquake struck Papua New Guinea, about 137 km north of Lae, on April 17 at a depth of 208.2 km.
- (South Georgia and the South Sandwich Islands) A magnitude 6.2 earthquake struck east of the South Sandwich Islands, on April 17 at a depth of 1 km.
- A magnitude 6.6 earthquake struck near the north coast of Papua, Indonesia, on April 21 at a depth of 29.8 km.
- A magnitude 6.7 earthquake hit Tonga, near Neiafu, on April 28, at a depth of 129.4 km.

=== May ===
May
- Strongest: 6.7 M_{w}, Argentina
- Total fatalities: 29

Number by magnitude
- 6.0–6.9: 9
- 5.0–5.9: 99

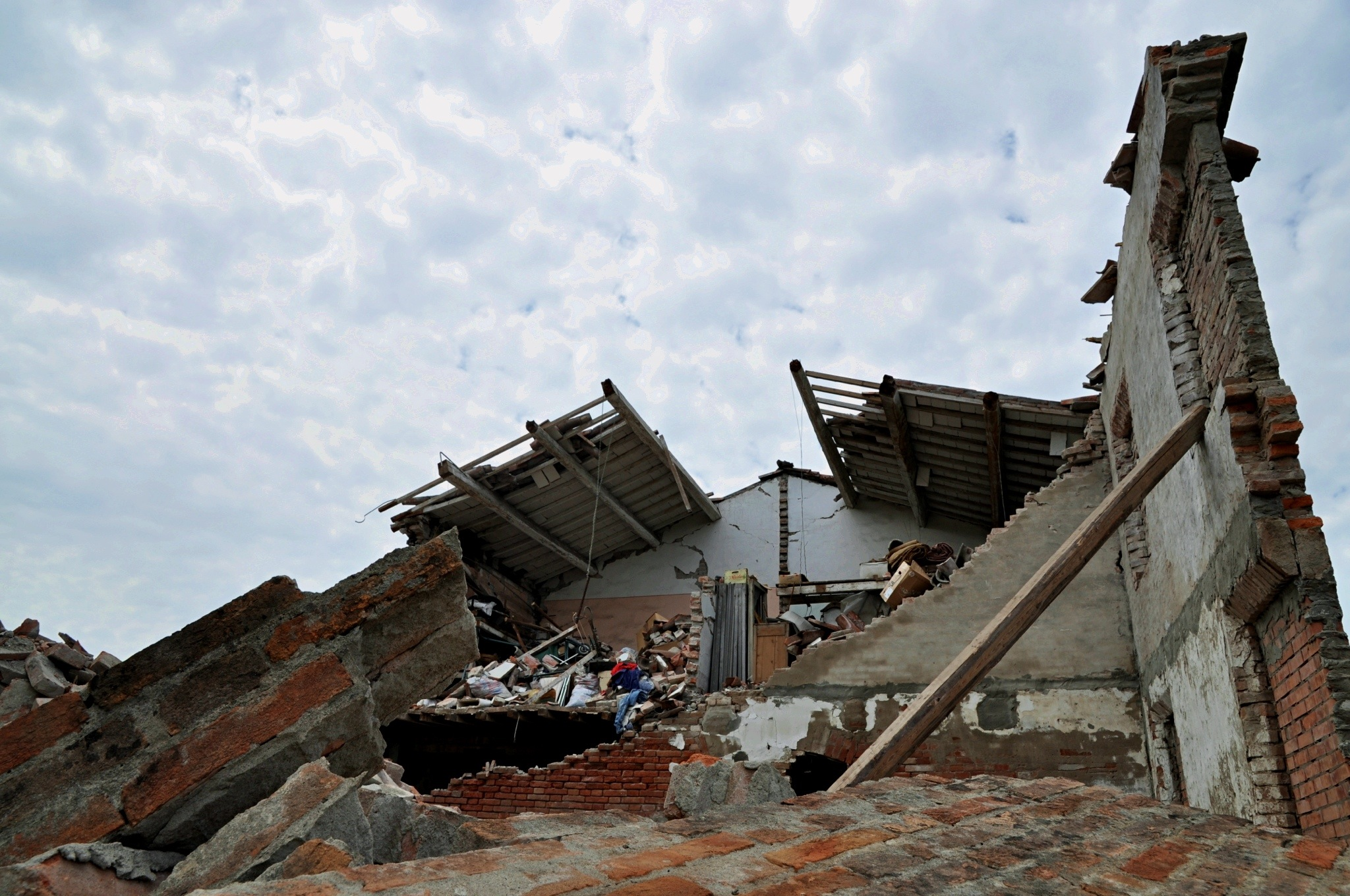
A destroyed house in Cento, Italy.

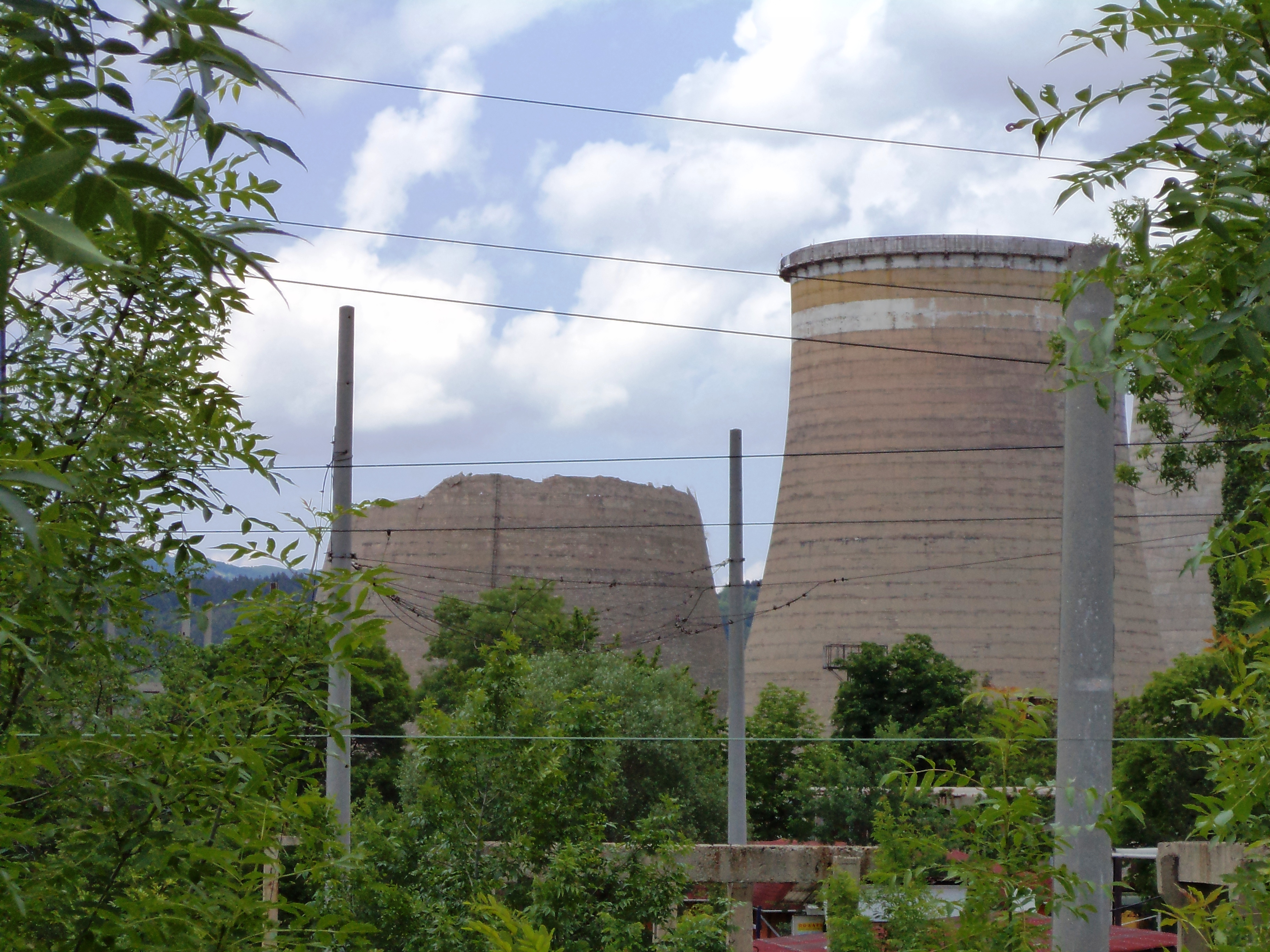
One of the three towers of the "Republika" Thermal Power Station in Pernik was heavily damaged in Bulgaria.

- A magnitude 6.0 earthquake struck offshore of Chiapas in Mexico on May 1, at a depth of 14 km.
- A magnitude 5.6 earthquake struck the western part of Azerbaijan on May 7, at a depth of 23 km. 35 people were injured as well as 3,100 buildings were damaged. Some damage also occurred in Georgia.
- A magnitude 5.9 earthquake struck Tajikistan on May 12, at a depth of 10 km. One person was killed.
- A magnitude 6.2 earthquake struck near the Peru-Chile border on May 14, at a depth of 98.3 km.
- A magnitude 6.0 earthquake struck the New Britain region of Papua New Guinea on May 16, at a depth of 154 km.
- A magnitude 6.2 earthquake struck about 600 km off the coast of Aisén Region of Chile on May 18, at a depth of 10 km.
- (Italy) A magnitude 6.0 earthquake struck Emilia region on May 20, at a depth of 6.3 km. Seven people died and over 50 others were injured.
- A magnitude 6.4 earthquake struck about 180 km off the east coast of Honshū Japan on May 20, at a depth of 15 km.
- A magnitude 5.6 earthquake struck 24 km west of Bulgaria's capital Sofia on May 22, at a depth of 10.0 km. A woman who suffered a heart attack was the only indirect fatality.
- A magnitude 6.1 earthquake struck about 100 km northeast of Hokkaido Japan on May 23, at a depth of 40.7 km.
- A magnitude 6.2 earthquake hit 600 km northwest of Tromsø Norway on May 24, at a depth of 8.8 km.
- A magnitude 6.0 earthquake struck about 225 km northwest of Iwo Jima, in the Bonin Islands region of Japan on May 26, at a depth of 472.6 km.
- A magnitude 6.7 earthquake struck about 117 km east of Santiago del Estero, Argentina on May 28, at a depth of 588 km.
- A magnitude 5.8 earthquake struck Medolla, Italy on May 29, at a depth of 10.2 km. Twenty people died.

=== June ===
June
- Strongest: 6.4 M_{w}, Panama; Japan
- Total fatalities: 79

Number by magnitude
- 6.0–6.9: 10
- 5.0–5.9: 88

- A magnitude 6.0 earthquake struck 8 km southeast of Yacuiba, Bolivia and 54 km north-northeast of Tartagal, Salta, Argentina on 2 June, at a depth of 519.6 km.
- A magnitude 6.3 earthquake struck southern pacific coast of Costa Rica Punta Burica, on June 3, at a depth of 10 km.
- A magnitude 6.2 earthquake struck in the Pacific Ocean 346 km south of David, Panama on 4 June, at a depth of 7 km.
- A magnitude 6.4 earthquake struck in the Pacific Ocean 323 km south of David, Panama on 4 June, at a depth of 5.9 km.
- A magnitude 6.0 earthquake struck Arequipa, Peru on 7 June, at a depth of 99.7 km.
- Two earthquakes measuring 5.4 and 5.7 struck Afghanistan on June 11, collapsing buildings and triggering landslides, one of which buried the village of Sayi Hazara. 75 people were reported dead as a result of the landslide.
- A magnitude 6.1 earthquake hit the Philippines near Dagupan, Luzon, on June 16, at a depth of 35.3 km.
- A magnitude 6.4 earthquake struck in the Pacific Ocean 28 km southeast of Ofunato, Japan on 18 June, at a depth of 36 km.
- A magnitude 6.0 quake struck 24 km northwest of Macquarie Island Australia, on June 22, at a depth of 9.9 km.
- (Russia) A magnitude 6.1 quake struck near the east coast of Kamchatka on June 24, at a depth of 17 km.
- A magnitude 5.5 earthquake struck the Sichuan–Yunnan border region of China on June 24, at a depth of 9.3 km (5.8 miles). At least four people died, and more than 150 others were injured.
- (China) A magnitude 6.3 earthquake struck Northern Xinjiang on June 30, at a depth of 10 km.

=== July ===
July
- Strongest: 6.7 M_{w} Mauritius
- Total fatalities: 2

Number by magnitude
- 7.0–7.9: 0
- 6.0–6.9: 11
- 5.0–5.9: 98

- A magnitude 6.3 earthquake struck New Zealand, near the Cook Strait, on 3 July at a depth of 236.1 km.
- A magnitude 6.3 earthquake struck near Vanuatu, on July 6, at a depth of 162.7 km.
- A magnitude 6.0 earthquake struck 268 km East of Kurilsk, Russia, on July 8, at a depth of 20 km.
- (Russia) A magnitude 6.0 earthquake struck Kuril Islands on July 20, at a depth of 22.7 km.
- (Russia) A magnitude 6.3 earthquake struck Kuril Islands on July 20.
- (China) A magnitude 4.9 earthquake struck Yangzhou on July 20, at a depth of 13.9 km. 1 death is confirmed.
- A magnitude 6.4 earthquake struck Simeulue, Indonesia, on July 25, at a depth of 22 km. One man died while fleeing his home.
- A magnitude 6.5 earthquake struck Solomon Islands, on July 25, at a depth of 22.9 km.
- A magnitude 6.7 earthquake struck 386 km (240 mi) NE of Rodrigues, 976 km (606 mi) ENE of Mauritius on July 26, at a depth of 9.8 km.
- A magnitude 6.5 earthquake struck near New Ireland, Papua New Guinea on July 26, at a depth of 43.4 km.
- (Mexico) A magnitude 6.0 earthquake struck Guatemala's Pacific Coast (Ocos) and felt in Chiapas, México on July 29, 2012, at a depth of 35.5 km.

=== August ===
August
- Strongest: 7.7 M_{w}, Russia
- Total fatalities: 313

Number by magnitude
- 7.0–7.9: 3
- 6.0–6.9: 10
- 5.0–5.9: 112

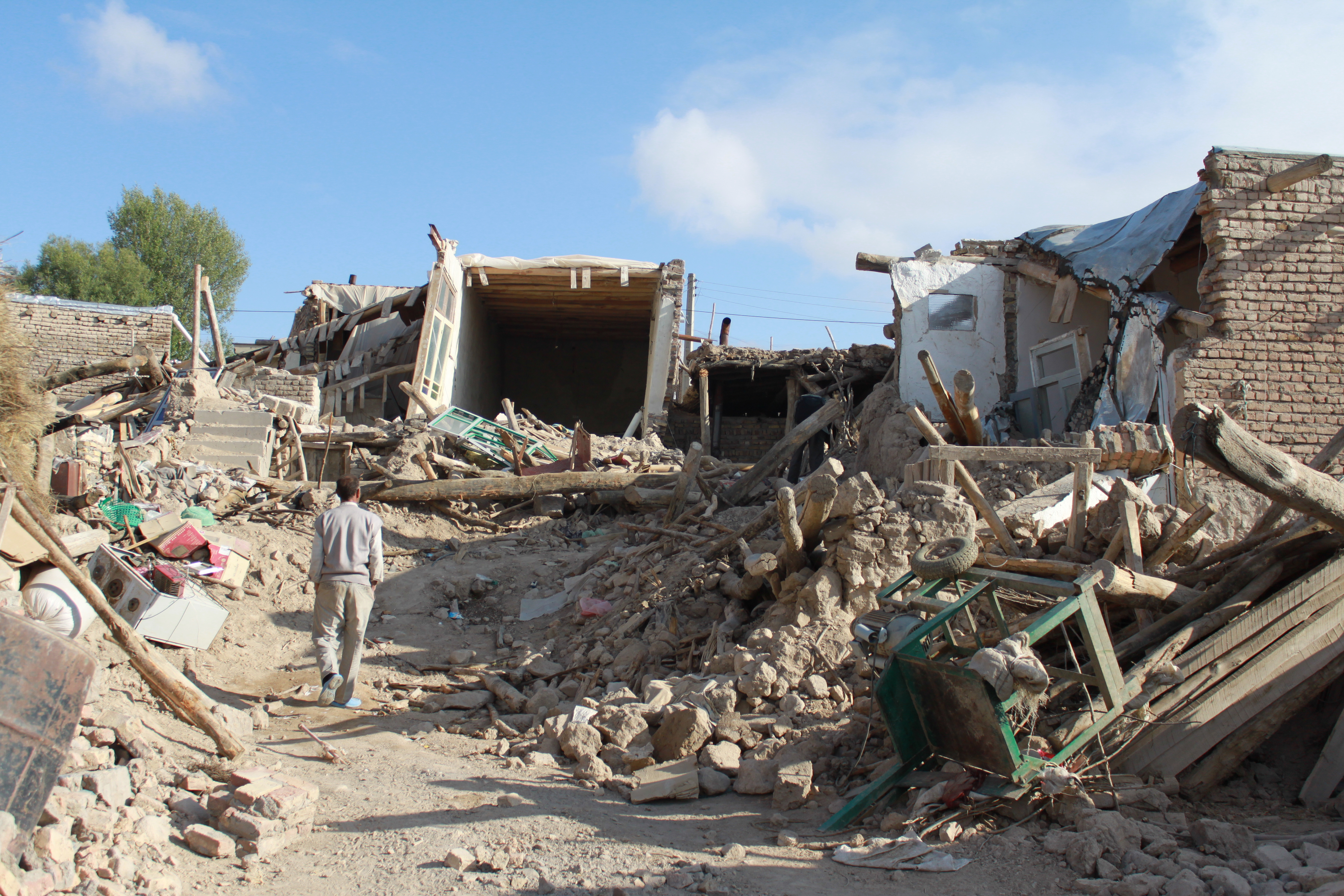
Many villages were completely destroyed in Iran by earthquakes.

- A magnitude 6.1 earthquake struck Central Peru on August 2, at a depth of 143.3 km.
- A magnitude 6.3 earthquake struck near New Ireland, Papua New Guinea, on August 2, at a depth of 70.6 km.
- (United States) A magnitude 6.2 earthquake struck 96 km southeast of Nikolski, Alaska on August 10, at a depth of 13.1 km.
- A magnitude 6.4 earthquake hit Iran, near Ahar, on August 11, at a depth of 11.0 km.
- A magnitude 6.2 earthquake hit Iran, near Ahar, on August 11, at a depth of 12.0 km.
- (Russia) A magnitude 7.7 earthquake hit the Sea of Okhotsk on August 14, at a depth of 625.9 km.
- A magnitude 6.3 earthquake struck Sulawesi, Indonesia, on August 18, at a depth of 19.9 km, killing six people.
- A magnitude 6.2 earthquake struck Papua New Guinea, on August 19, at a depth of 77.3 km.
- (Indonesia) A magnitude 6.6 earthquake struck Molucca Sea, on August 26, at a depth of 91.9 km.
- A magnitude 7.3 earthquake struck offshore El Salvador, on August 26, at a depth of 28 km. It generated a 6-meter-high tsunami, injuring more than 40 people.
- (Norway) A magnitude 6.8 earthquake struck Jan Mayen, on August 30, at a depth of 9.9 km.
- A magnitude 7.6 earthquake struck offshore the Philippines, near Guiuan, Samar on August 31, at a depth of 28 km. One person was killed and another injured.

=== September ===
September
- Strongest: 7.6M_{w}, Costa Rica
- Total fatalities: 2

Number by magnitude
- 7.0–7.9: 2
- 6.0–6.9: 7
- 5.0–5.9: 111

- A magnitude 6.4 earthquake hit Indonesia, near South of Java, on September 3, at a depth of 8.8 km.
- A magnitude 6.0 earthquake struck 190 km northwest of Sola, Vanuatu, on September 5, at a depth of 17.6 km.
- A magnitude 7.6 earthquake struck Nicoya Peninsula in the province of Guanacaste, Costa Rica, on September 5, at a depth of 35.0 km.
- Two quakes measuring 5.6 struck China's Yunnan Province on September 7, at a depth of 9.9 km. At least 81 deaths and 821 injuries were reported, with more than 20,000 homes damaged.
- A magnitude 6.1 earthquake struck off the north coast of Papua, Indonesia, on September 8, at a depth of 14.1 km.
- A magnitude 6.0 earthquake struck off the Kuril Islands, Russia, on September 9, at a depth of 58.7 km.
- A magnitude 6.2 earthquake struck the Kepulauan Mentawai Region, Indonesia, on September 14, at a depth of 19.8 km.
- A magnitude 6.3 earthquake struck the La Paz Mexico, on September 26, at a depth of 10.1 km.
- (United States) A magnitude 6.4 earthquake struck near the Tanaga Volcano, Alaska, on September 26, at a depth of 9.9 km.
- (Mexico) A magnitude 6.0 earthquake struck Pinotepa Nacional, Oaxaca, on September 29, at depth of 20 km.
- A magnitude 7.3 earthquake struck near Isnos, Colombia, on September 30, at a depth of 170 km.

=== October ===
October
- Strongest: 7.8 M_{w}, Canada
- Total fatalities: 2

Number by magnitude
- 7.0–7.9: 1
- 6.0–6.9: 13
- 5.0–5.9: 103

- (Japan) A magnitude 6.2 earthquake struck Miyako, on October 2, at depth of 9.7 km.
- A magnitude 6.0 earthquake struck offshore Mexico in the Gulf of California, on October 8, at depth of 9.9 km.
- A magnitude 6.3 earthquake struck offshore Indonesia in the Banda Sea, on October 8, at depth of 34.7 km.
- A magnitude 6.6 earthquake struck the Balleny Islands, Antarctica on October 9, at depth of 10.2 km.
- (Chile) A magnitude 6.2 earthquake struck Los Andes, on October 11.
- (Indonesia) A magnitude 6.7 earthquake struck Dobo, on October 12, at depth of 24.7 km.
- (Philippines) A magnitude 6.0 earthquake struck the Celebes Sea on October 17, at depth of 337.4 km.
- A magnitude 6.2 earthquake struck Vanuatu, on October 21, at depth of 35.6 km.
- A magnitude 6.0 struck Izu Islands, Japan, on October 23, at depth of 446 km.
- A magnitude 6.0 earthquake struck west of New Caledonia, on October 23, at a depth of 127 km.
- A magnitude 6.5 earthquake struck Hojancha, Costa Rica on October 24, at depth of 20.1 km.
- A magnitude 5.5 earthquake struck Mormanno, Italy, on October 25, at depth of 3.8 km. 1 indirect death was reported, along with moderate damage.
- A magnitude 7.8 earthquake struck the Haida Gwaii region, Canada, on October 28 at a depth of 20 km. One person died in a crash near a road that was closed because of a tsunami threat near Hawaii's northern coast. This was later followed by a magnitude 6.3 aftershock, at a depth of 8.2 km, and a magnitude 6.2 aftershock on October 29, at a depth of 10 km.

=== November ===
November
- Strongest: 7.4 M_{w}, Guatemala
- Total fatalities: 177

Number by magnitude
- 7.0–7.9: 1
- 6.0–6.9: 14
- 5.0–5.9: 85

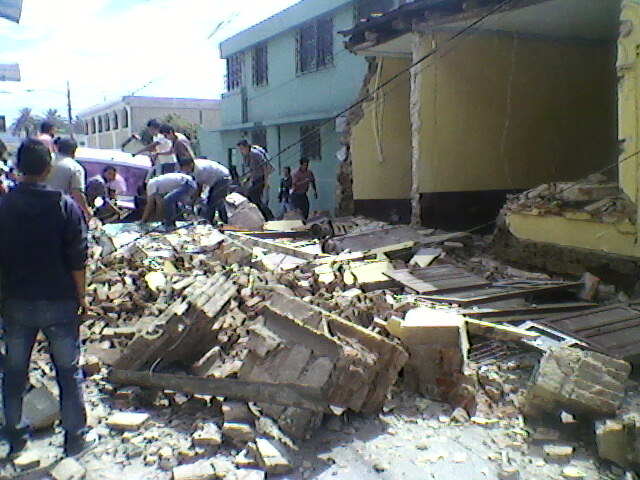
Heavy damage to buildings in San Marcos, Guatemala.

- A magnitude 6.2 earthquake struck Java, Indonesia, on November 1, at depth of 142 km.
- A magnitude 6.4 earthquake struck Burgos, Philippines, on November 2, at depth of 54.5 km.
- A magnitude 6.0 earthquake struck Carlsberg Ridge, In the Yemen's maritime territory, on November 6, at depth of 10.2 km.
- A magnitude 7.4 earthquake struck off the coast of Guatemala, near Mexico, on November 7, at depth of 24.0 km, with 139 people dead.
- A magnitude 6.3 earthquake struck off the Vancouver Island region, Canada, on November 8, at a depth of 16.6 km.
- A magnitude 6.8 earthquake struck near Shwebo, Myanmar, on November 11, at a depth of 9.8 km, with at least 38 dead or missing.
- A magnitude 6.0 earthquake struck Central Peru, on November 11, at a depth of 100 km.
- : A magnitude 6.0 earthquake struck Shwebo, Myanmar, on November 11, at a depth of 9.8 km.
- A magnitude 6.5 earthquake struck off the coast of Guatemala, near Mexico, on November 11, at depth of 27 km.
- : A magnitude 6.4 earthquake struck Gulf of Alaska, United States, on November 12, at depth of 12 km.
- A magnitude 6.0 earthquake struck off the coast of Aisén Region, Chile, on November 13, at a depth of 9.7 km.
- A magnitude 6.1 earthquake struck Vallenar, Chile, on November 14, at a depth of 61.8 km.
- A magnitude 6.1 earthquake struck Guerrero, Mexico, on November 15, at a depth of 60.9 km.
- A magnitude 6.5 earthquake struck the Kuril Islands, Russia, on November 16, at a depth of 29.1 km.
- A magnitude 6.1 earthquake struck northeast of Tonga, on November 17, at a depth of 9.8 km.

=== December ===
December
- Strongest: 7.3 M_{w}, Japan
- Total fatalities: 12

Number by magnitude
- 7.0–7.9: 2
- 6.0–6.9: 9
- 5.0–5.9: 98

- A magnitude 6.4 earthquake struck Vanuatu on December 2, at a depth of 34.1 km.
- A magnitude 5.6 earthquake struck Zohan, Iran on December 5, at a depth of 5.6 km, with 9 people dead or missing.
- A magnitude 7.3 earthquake struck off the coast of Honshu, Japan on December 7, at a depth of 36.1 km. A small tsunami of 1m was recorded. 3 people were confirmed dead.
- A magnitude 6.2 earthquake struck off the coast of Honshu, Japan on December 7, at a depth of 29.2 km.
- A magnitude 6.3 earthquake struck the North Island of New Zealand on December 7, at a depth of 167.2 km.
- A magnitude 7.1 earthquake struck in the Banda Sea near Indonesia on December 10, at a depth of 159.3 km.
- (Mexico) (United States) A magnitude 6.4 earthquake struck off the coast of Baja California near Ensenada on December 14, at a depth of 10.1 km.
- A magnitude 6.1 earthquake struck the New Britain region, Papua New Guinea on December 15, at a depth of 52 km.
- A magnitude 6.1 earthquake struck Sulawesi, Indonesia on December 17, at a depth of 18.5 km.
- A magnitude 6.8 earthquake struck Vanuatu on December 21, at a depth of 207.9 km.
- A magnitude 6.0 earthquake struck near Papua New Guinea on December 29, at a depth of 10.1 km.
