= Puerto Sandino =

- Town
- Location in Nicaragua
- Coordinates: 12°11′58″N 86°45′47″W
- Country: Nicaragua
- Department: León
- Municipality: Nagarote

Population (2017)
  - Total: 4,371

Puerto Sandino is a town on Nicaragua's Pacific Ocean coast, in the León Department. Prior to the Sandinista Revolution it was known as Puerto Somoza. Due to its crude oil supply line, it is a major port, and also plays a large role in Nicaragua's fishing industry. Puerto Sandino is an extremely popular location for surfing.

== U.S. attacks ==
While supporting the Contras in the 1980s, U.S. forces attacked Puerto Sandino on September 13 and October 14 of 1983. On March 28 and March 30, 1984, U.S. forces attacked patrol boats at Puerto Sandino.
