= Slow earthquake =

Discontinuous earthquake-like event

A slow earthquake, also known as a silent earthquake, is a discontinuous, earthquake-like event that releases energy over a period of hours to months, rather than the seconds to minutes characteristic of a typical earthquake. First detected using long term strain measurements, most slow earthquakes now appear to be accompanied by fluid flow and related tremor, which can be detected and approximately located using seismometer data filtered appropriately (typically in the 1–5 Hz band). That is, they are quiet compared to a regular earthquake, but not "silent" as described in the past.

Slow earthquakes should not be confused with tsunami earthquakes, in which relatively slow rupture velocity produces tsunami out of proportion to the triggering earthquake. In a tsunami earthquake, the rupture propagates along the fault more slowly than usual, but the energy release occurs on a similar timescale to other earthquakes.

== Causes ==
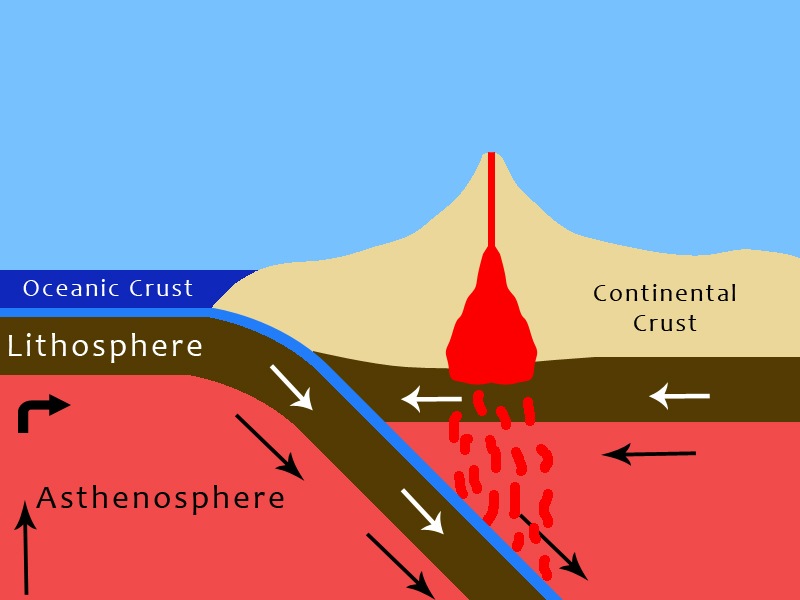
Common Cross Section of a Subduction Zone

Earthquakes occur as a consequence of gradual stress increases in a region, and once it reaches the maximum stress that the rocks can withstand a rupture generates and the resulting earthquake motion is related to a drop in the shear stress of the system. Earthquakes generate seismic waves when the rupture in the system occurs; the seismic waves consist of different types of waves that are capable of moving through the Earth like ripples over water. The causes that lead to slow earthquakes have only been theoretically investigated, by the formation of longitudinal shear cracks that were analysed using mathematical models. The different distributions of initial stress, sliding frictional stress, and specific fracture energy are all taken into account. If the initial stress minus the sliding frictional stress (with respect to the initial crack) is low, and the specific fracture energy or the strength of the crustal material (relative to the amount of stress) is high then slow earthquakes will occur regularly. In other words, slow earthquakes are caused by a variety of stick-slip and creep processes intermediated between asperity-controlled brittle and ductile fracture. Asperities are tiny bumps and protrusions along the faces of fractures. They are best documented from intermediate crustal levels of certain subduction zones (especially those that dip shallowly – SW Japan, Cascadia, Chile), but appear to occur on other types of faults as well, notably strike-slip plate boundaries such as the San Andreas fault and "mega-landslide" normal faults on the flanks of volcanos.

== Locations ==
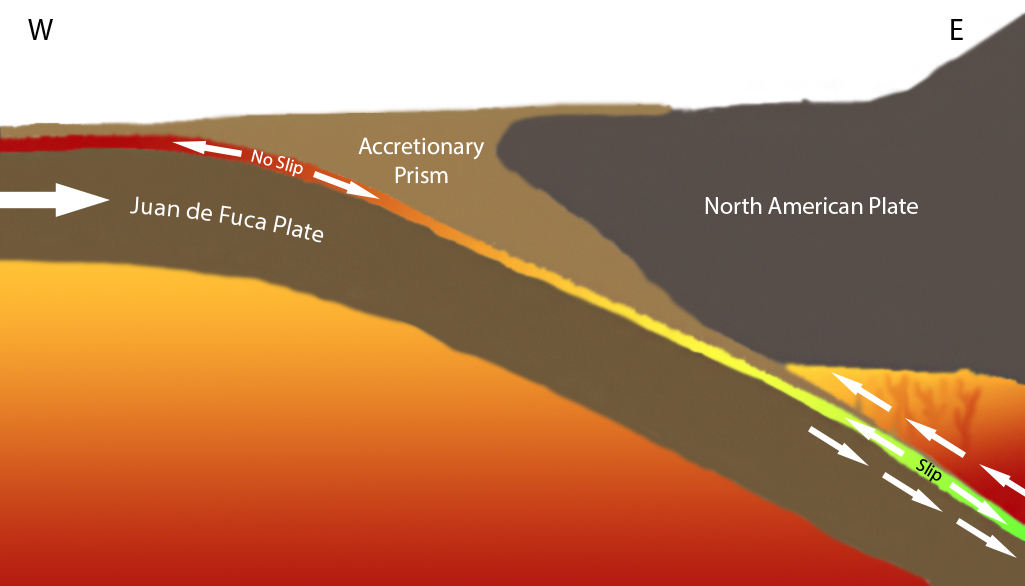
Cascadia Subduction Cross Section

Faulting takes place all over Earth; faults can include convergent, divergent, and transform faults, and normally occur on plate margins. As of 2013 some of the locations that have been recently studied for slow earthquakes include: Cascadia, California, Japan, New Zealand, Mexico, and Alaska. The locations of slow earthquakes can provide new insights into the behavior of normal or fast earthquakes. By observing the location of tremors associated with slow-slip and slow earthquakes, seismologists can determine the extension of the system and estimate future earthquakes in the area of study.

== Types ==
Teruyuki Kato identifies various types of slow earthquake:

- low frequency earthquakes (LFE)
- very low frequency earthquakes (VLF) and deep-low-frequency earthquakes
- slow slip events (SSE)
- episodic tremor and slip (ETS)

== Low frequency earthquakes ==
Plots of seismic events based on their average amplitudes and frequencies. Low frequency earthquakes are peaked between 1 and 3 Hz.

Low frequency earthquakes (LFEs) are seismic events defined by waveforms with periods far greater than those of ordinary earthquakes and abundantly occur during slow earthquakes. LFEs can be volcanic, semi-volcanic, or tectonic in origin, but only tectonic LFEs or LFEs generated during slow earthquakes are described here. Tectonic LFEs are characterized by generally low magnitudes (M<3) and have frequencies peaked between 1 and 3 Hz. They are the largest constituent of non-volcanic tremor at subduction zones, and in some cases are the only constituent. In contrast to ordinary earthquakes, tectonic LFEs occur largely during long-lived slip events at subduction interfaces (up to several weeks in some cases) called slow slip events (SSEs). The mechanism responsible for their generation at subduction zones is thrust-sense slip along transitional segments of the plate interface. LFEs are highly sensitive seismic events which can likely be triggered by tidal forces as well as propagating waves from distant earthquakes. LFEs have hypocenters located down-dip from the seismogenic zone, the source region of megathrust earthquakes. During SSEs, LFE foci migrate along strike at the subduction interface in concert with the primary shear slip front.

The depth occurrence of low frequency earthquakes is in the range of approximately 20–45 kilometers depending on the subduction zone, and at shallower depths at strike-slip faults in California. At "warm" subduction zones like the west coast of North America, or sections in eastern Japan this depth corresponds to a transition or transient slip zone between the locked and stable slip intervals of the plate interface. The transition zone is located at depths approximately coincidental with the continental Mohorovicic discontinuity. At the Cascadia subduction zone, the distribution of LFEs form a surface roughly parallel to intercrustal seismic events, but displaced 5–10 kilometers down-dip, providing evidence that LFEs are generated at the plate interface.

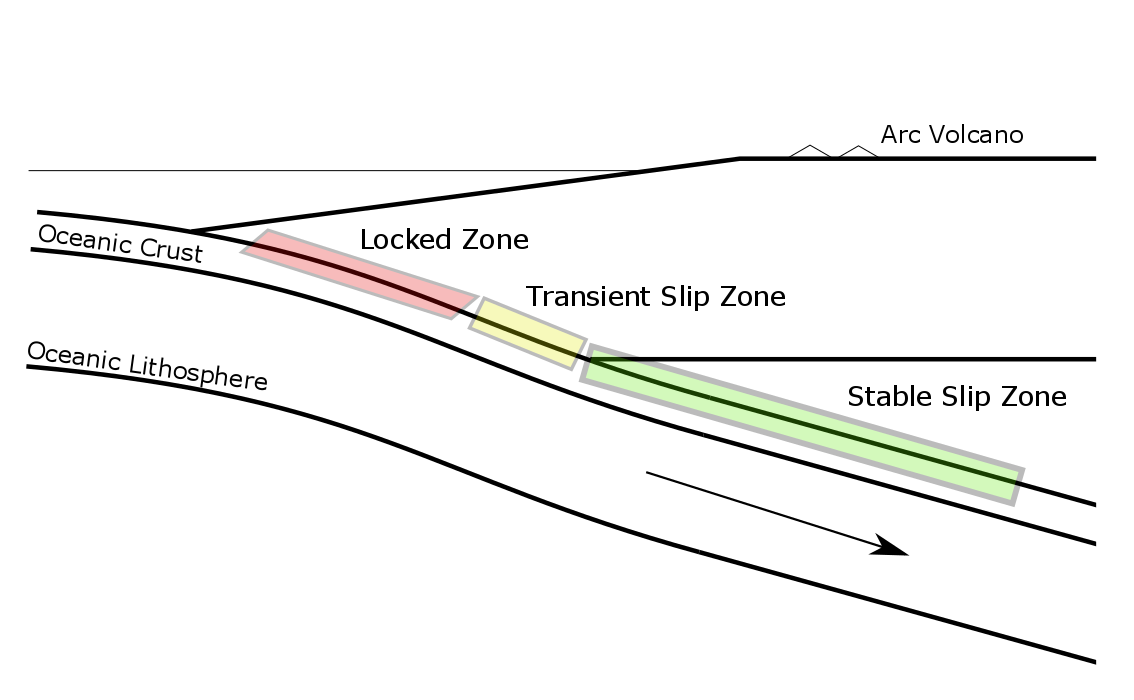
Subducting plate geometry and the kinematically defined interplate zones. The locked zone is the most shallow where the two plates are locked together, the transient slip zone is downdip of the locked zone and is the site of SSEs, and the stable slip zone is where the two plates are continuously slipping at their interface.

Low frequency earthquakes are an active area of research and may be important seismic indicators for higher magnitude earthquakes. Since slow slip events and their corresponding LFE signals have been recorded, none of them have been accompanied by a megathrust earthquake, however, SSEs act to increase the stress in the seismogenic zone by forcing the locked interval between the subducting and overriding plate to accommodate for down-dip movement. Some calculations find that the probability of a large earthquake occurring during a slow slip event are 30–100 times greater than background probabilities. Understanding the seismic hazard that LFEs might herald is among the primary reasons for their research. Additionally, LFEs are useful for the tomographic imaging of subduction zones because their distributions accurately map the deep plate contact near the Mohorovicic discontinuity.

=== History ===
Low frequency earthquakes were first classified in 1999 when the Japan Meteorological Agency (JMA) began differentiating LFE's seismic signature in their seismicity catalogue. The discovery and understanding of LFEs at subduction zones is due in part to the fact that the seismic signatures of these events were found away from volcanoes. Prior to their discovery, tremor events of this style were mainly associated with volcanism where the tremor is generated by partial coupling of flowing magmatic fluids. Japanese researchers first detected "low-frequency continuous tremor" near the top of the subducting Philippine Sea plate in 2002. After initially interpreting this seismic data as dehydration induced tremor, researchers in 2007 found that the data contained many LFE waveforms, or LFE swarms. Prior to 2007, tremor and LFEs were believed to be distinct events that often occurred together, but contemporarily LFEs are known to be the largest constituent forming tectonic tremor. LFEs and SSEs are frequently observed at subduction zones in western North America, Japan, Mexico, Costa Rica, New Zealand, as well as in shallow strike slip faults in California.

=== Detection ===
Low frequency earthquakes do not exhibit the same seismic character as regular earthquakes namely because they lack distinct, impulsive body waves. P wave arrivals from LFEs have amplitudes so small that they are often difficult to detect, so when the JMA first distinguished the unique class of earthquake it was primarily by the detection of S wave arrivals which were emergent. Because of this, detecting LFEs is nearly impossible using classical techniques. Despite their lack of important seismic identifiers, LFEs can be detected at low Signal-to-Noise-Ratio (SNR) thresholds using advanced seismic correlation methods. The most common method for identifying LFEs involves the correlation of the seismic record with a template constructed from confirmed LFE waveforms. Since LFEs are such subtle events and have amplitudes that are frequently drowned out by background noise, templates are built by stacking similar LFE waveforms to reduce the SNR. Noise is reduced to such an extent that a relatively clean waveform can be searched for in the seismic record, and when correlation coefficients are deemed high enough an LFE is detected. Determination of the slip orientation responsible for LFEs and earthquakes in general is done by the P wave first-motion method. LFE P waves, when successfully detected, have first motions indicative of compressional stress, indicating that thrust-sense slip is responsible for their generation. Extracting high quality P wave data out of LFE waveforms can be quite difficult, however, and is furthermore important for accurate hypocentral depth determinations. The detection of high quality P wave arrivals is a recent advent thanks to the deployment of highly sensitive seismic monitoring networks. The depth occurrence of LFEs are generally determined by P wave arrivals but have also been determined by mapping LFE epicenters against subducting plate geometries. This method does not discriminate whether or not the observed LFE was triggered at the plate interface or within the down-going slab itself, so additional geophysical analysis is required to determine where exactly the focus is located. Both methods find that LFEs are indeed triggered at the plate contact.

=== Low frequency earthquakes in Cascadia ===
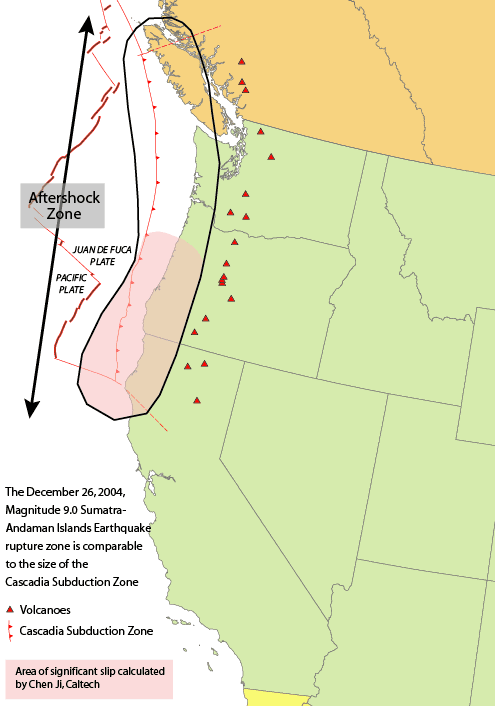
Cascadia subduction zone.

GPS data recording episodic slip events in the Cascadia from Albert Head Station, Victoria

The Cascadia subduction zone spans from northern California to about halfway up Vancouver Island and is where the Juan de Fuca, Explorer, and Gorda plates are overridden by North America. In the Cascadia subduction zone, LFEs are predominantly observed at the plate interface down-dip of the seismogenic zone. In the southern section of the subduction zone from latitudes 40°N to 41.8°N low frequency earthquakes occur at depths between 28 and 47 kilometers, whereas farther north near Vancouver Island the range contracts to approximately 25–37 kilometers. This depth section of the subduction zone has been classified by some authors as the "transient slip" or "transition" zone due to its episodic slip behavior and is bounded up-dip and down-dip by the "locked zone" and "stable-slip zone", respectively. The transient slip section of the Cascadia is marked by high Vp/Vs ratios (P wave velocity divided by S wave velocity) and is designated as a Low Velocity Zone (LVZ). Furthermore, the LVZ has high Poisson's ratios as determined by teleseismic wave observations. These seismic properties defining the LVZ have been interpreted as an overpressured region of the down-going slab with high pore fluid pressures. The presence of water at the subduction interface and its relation to the generation of LFEs is not fully understood, but hydrolytic weakening of the rock contact is likely important.

Where megathrust earthquakes (M>8) have been repeatedly observed in the shallow sections (<25 km depth) of the Cascadia subduction zone, low frequency earthquakes have recently been discovered to occur at greater depths, down-dip of the seismogenic zone. The first indicator of low frequency earthquakes in Cascadia was discovered in 1999 when an aseismic event took place at the subduction interface wherein the overriding North American plate slipped 2 centimeters south-west over a several-week period as recorded by Global Positioning System (GPS) sites in British Columbia. This apparent slow slip event occurred over a 50-by-300-kilometer area and took approximately 35 days. Researchers estimated that the energy released in such an event would be equivalent to a magnitude 6–7 earthquake, yet no significant seismic signal was detected. The aseismic character of the event led observers to conclude that the slip was mediated by ductile deformation at depth. After further analysis of the GPS record, these reverse slip events were found to repeat at 13- to 16-month intervals, and last 2 to 4 weeks at any one GPS station. Soon after, geophysicists were able to extract the seismic signatures from these slow slip events and found that they were akin to tremor and classified the phenomenon as episodic tremor and slip (ETS). Upon the advent of improved processing techniques, and the discovery that LFEs form part of tremor, low frequency earthquakes were widely considered a commonplace occurrence at the plate interface down-dip of the seismogenic zone in Cascadia.

Low frequency tremors in the Cascadia subduction zone are strongly associated with tidal loading. A number of studies in Cascadia find that the peak low frequency earthquake signals alternate from being in phase with peak tidal shear stress rate to being in phase with peak tidal shear stress, suggesting that LFEs are modulated by changes in sea level. The shear slip events responsible for LFEs are therefore quite sensitive to pressure changes in the range of several kilo-pascals.

=== Low frequency earthquakes in Japan ===
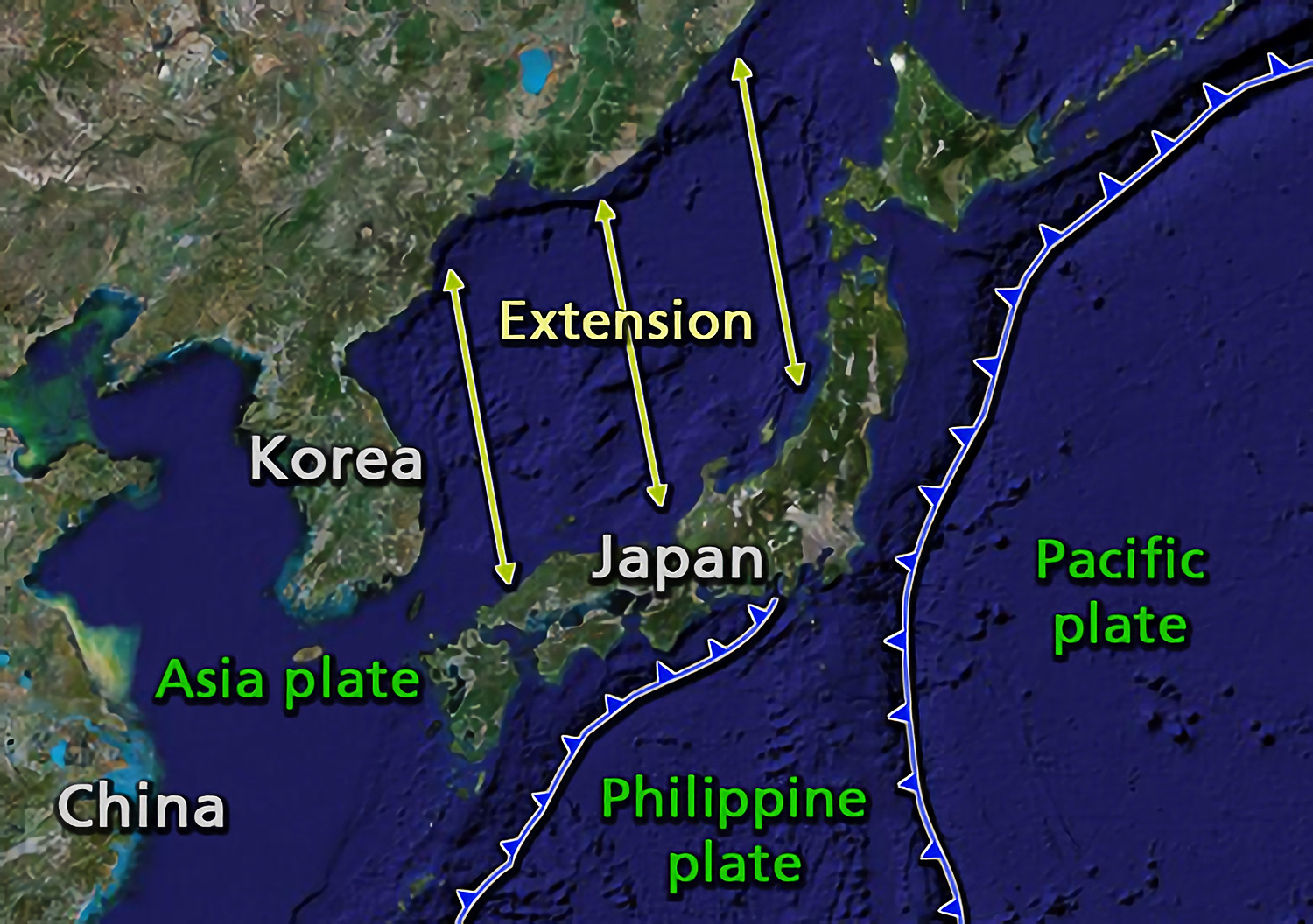
Japan subduction setting.

The discovery of LFEs originates in Japan at the Nankai trough and is in part due to the nationwide collaboration of seismological research following the Kobe earthquake of 1995. Low frequency earthquakes in Japan were first observed in a subduction setting where the Philippine Sea plate subducts at the Nankai trough near Shikoku. The low-frequency continuous tremor researchers observed was initially interpreted to be a result of dehydration reactions in the subducting plate. The source of these tremors occurred at an average depth of around 30 kilometers, and they were distributed along the strike of the subduction interface over a length of 600 kilometers. Similar to Cascadia, these low frequency tremors occurred with slow slip events that had a recurrence interval of approximately 6 months. The later discovery of LFEs forming tremor confirmed the widespread existence of LFEs at Japanese subduction zones, and LFEs are widely observed and believed to occur as a result of SSEs.

The distribution of LFEs in Japan are centered around the subduction of the Philippine Sea plate and not the Pacific plate farther north. This is likely due to the difference in subduction geometries between the two plates. The Philippine Sea plate at the Nankai trough subducts at shallower overall angles than does the Pacific plate at the Japan Trench, thereby making the Japan trench less suitable for SSEs and LFEs. LFEs in Japan have hypocenters located near the deepest extent of the transition zone, down-dip from the seismogenic zone. Estimates for the depth occurrence of the seismogenic zone near Tokai, Japan are 8–22 kilometers as determined by thermal methods. Furthermore, LFEs occur at a temperature range of 450–500 °C in Tokai, indicating that temperature may play an important role in the generation of LFEs in Japan.

== Very low frequency earthquakes ==
Very low frequency earthquakes (VLFs) can be considered a sub-category of low frequency earthquakes that differ in terms of duration and period. VLFs have magnitudes of approximately 3-3.5, durations around 20 seconds, and are further enriched in low frequency energy (0.03–0.02 Hz). VLFs predominantly occur with LFEs, but the reverse is not true. There are two major subduction zone settings where VLFs have been detected, 1) within the offshore accretionary prism and 2) at the plate interface down-dip of the seismogenic zone. Since these two environments have considerably different depths, they have been termed shallow VLFs and deep VLFs, respectively. Like LFEs, very low frequency earthquakes migrate along-strike during ETS events. VLFs have been found at both the Cascadia subduction zone in western North America, as well as in Japan at the Nankai trough and Ryukyu trench.

VLFs are produced by reverse fault mechanisms, similar to LFEs.

== Slow slip events ==
Slow slip events (SSEs) are long lived shear slip events at subduction interfaces and the physical processes responsible for the generation of slow earthquakes. They are slow thrust-sense displacement episodes that can have durations up to several weeks, and are thus termed "slow". In many cases, the recurrence interval for slow slip events is remarkably periodic and accompanied by tectonic tremor, prompting seismologists to term episodic tremor and slip (ETS). In the Cascadia, the return period for SSEs is approximately 14.5 months, but varies along the margin of the subduction zone. In the Shikoku region in southwest Japan, the interval is shorter at approximately 6 months, as determined by crustal tilt changes. Some SSEs have durations in excess of several years, like the Tokai SSE that lasted from mid-2000 to 2003.

Slow slip event's locus of displacement propagate along the strike of subduction interfaces at velocities of 5–10 kilometers per day during slow earthquakes in the Cascadia, and this propagation is responsible for the similar migration of LFEs and tremor.

== Episodic tremor and slip ==
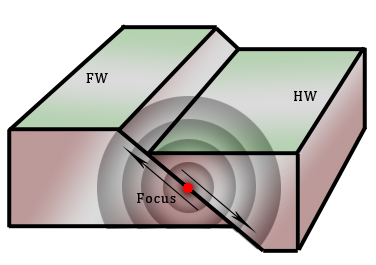
Earthquake FW-HW diagram

Slow earthquakes can be episodic (relative of plate movement), and therefore somewhat predictable, a phenomenon termed "episodic tremor and slip" or "ETS" in the literature. ETS events can last for weeks as opposed to "normal earthquakes" occur in a matter of seconds. Several slow-earthquake events around the world appear to have triggered major, damaging seismic earthquakes in the shallower crust (e.g., 2001 Nisqually, 1995 Antofagasta). Conversely, major earthquakes trigger "post-seismic creep" in the deeper crust and mantle.

Every five years a year-long quake of this type occurs beneath the New Zealand capital, Wellington. It was first measured in 2003, and has reappeared in 2008 and 2013. It lasts for around a year each time, releasing as much energy as a magnitude 7 quake.

== See also ==
- Aseismic creep
- Long period ground motion
