= Nagarote =

- Municipality
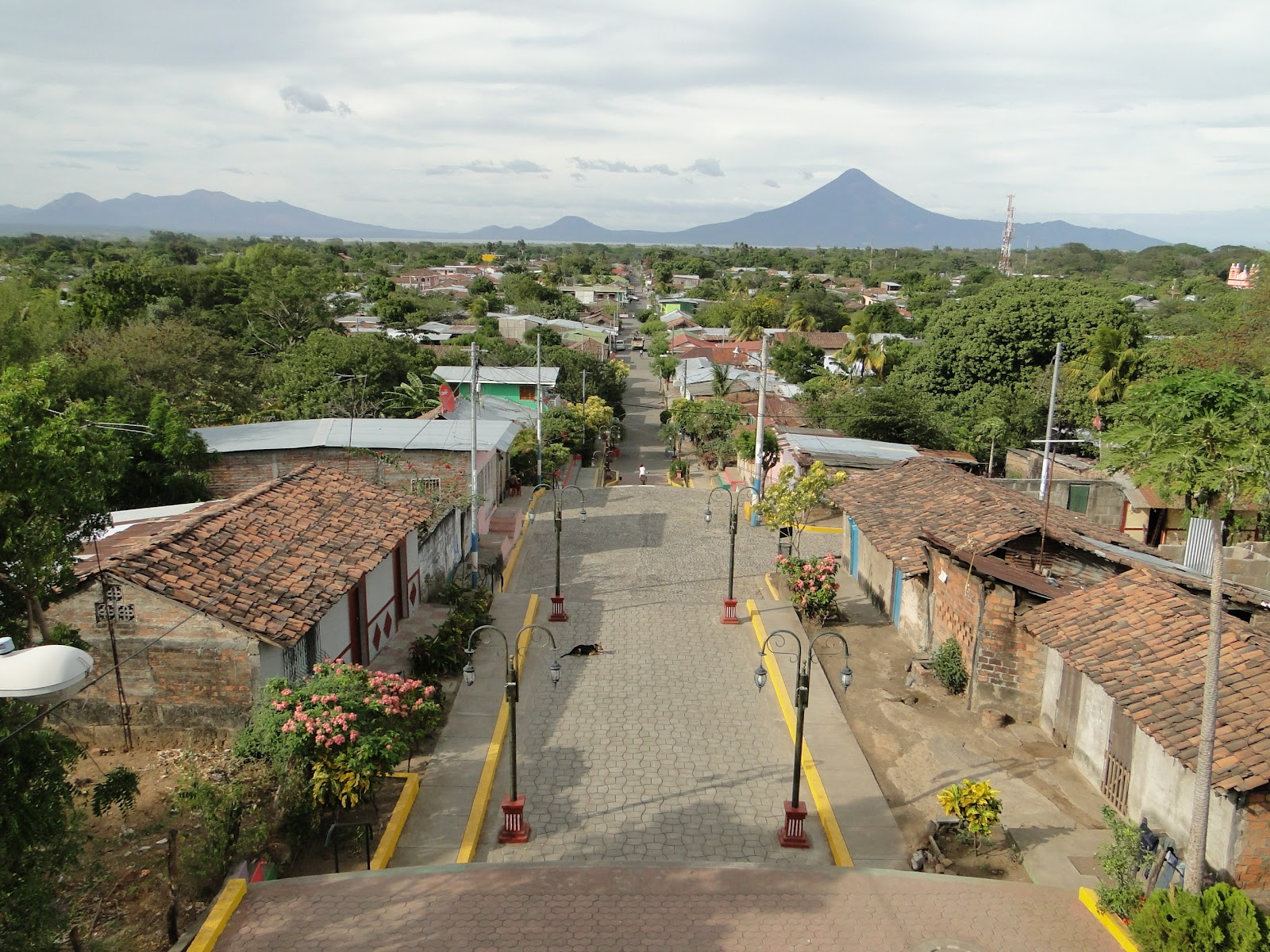

- Location in Nicaragua
- Coordinates: 12°16′0″N 86°34′0″W
- Country: Nicaragua
- Department: León Department

Area
  - Municipality: 598 km^{2} (231 sq mi)

Population (2022 estimate)
  - Municipality: 39,264
  - Density: 65.7/km^{2} (170/sq mi)
  - Urban: 25,827
- Time zone: UTC−6 (Central (CST))

Nagarote (Spanish pronunciation: [naɣaˈɾote]) is a town and a municipality in the León Department of Nicaragua.

The town of Nagarote has a population of 25,827 while the rural areas surrounding it has a population of 13,437. Nagarote is located 42 km (26 mi) from Managua.

== History ==
Nagarote formerly had a flourishing sea port called Puerto Sandino. This port was attacked in 1983, with much destruction to the facilities which effectively destroyed the port.

== Economy and tourism ==
Nagarote's economy is largely based on cattle ranching and agriculture. Its fertile soils give rise to crops such as soybeans, cotton, peanuts, corn, vegetables and tobacco. Salt is also produced in the municipality.

Nagarote is well known for its stunning natural surroundings. The coastline extends some 24 km and has wide open beaches and sparkling waters. Xolotlán Lake is also a tourist hot-spot during the summer months. Nagarote boasts some of the best beaches in Nicaragua. Over and above the natural attractions in the municipality of Nagarote, there are also several interesting historical attractions. One such site is the Paochial Temple of Nagarote. This marvelous structure was declared a National Monument in December 1955. The temple was constructed in 1575 in the style that was typical at the time. It is noted for is historical value and sheer stateliness. Another popular attraction is the famous tree of Nagarote. This large tree has been in existence for some 950 years. A remarkable natural structure, the tree has been a constant feature in a growing city. A park has been created around the tree.

== Festivals ==
At the end of July, celebrations dedicated to the city's patron Santiago Apostle take place. Celebrations begin on 24 July with bullfights, games and dancing. 26 July is called Santa Ana day. Celebrations end on 28 July.

== International relations ==
=== Twin towns – Sister cities ===
Nagarote is paired with Norwalk, Connecticut in the U.S. as the result of a sister city consortium to pair six U.S. communities with six in Nicaragua for the purposes of fostering community development, and operates as the Norwalk/Nagarote Sister City Project.

- (United States) Norwalk, Connecticut
