= 2012 Costa Rica earthquake =

Earthquake in Costa Rica

- Location within Central America
- UTC time: 2012-09-05 14:42:08
- ISC event: 601675877
- USGS-ANSS: ComCat
- Local date: September 5, 2012
- Local time: 08:42:08
- Magnitude: 7.6 M_{w}
- Depth: 40.2 km (25.0 mi)
- Epicenter: 9.996°N 85.318°W
- Areas affected: Costa Rica
- Total damage: US$44.8 million
- Max. intensity: MMI X (Extreme)
- Peak acceleration: 1.61 g (1580 cm/s^{2})
- Aftershocks: 1,650
- Casualties: 2 dead

The 2012 Costa Rica earthquake occurred at 08:42 local time (14:42 UTC) on September 5. The epicenter of the 7.6 M_{w} earthquake was in the Nicoya Peninsula, 11 kilometers east-southeast of Nicoya. A tsunami warning was issued shortly afterwards, but later cancelled. Two people are known to have died, one from a heart attack and another, a construction worker, crushed by a collapsing wall. It was the second strongest earthquake recorded in Costa Rica's history, following the 1991 Limon earthquake.

== Geology ==
Costa Rica lies above the convergent plate boundary where the Cocos plate is subducting beneath the Caribbean plate at a rate of 9 cm per year. Off the Nicoya Peninsula, the Cocos plate is subducting along the Middle America Trench, and the Nicoya Peninsula is unique in being one of the few landmasses along the Pacific Rim located directly above the seismogenic zone of a subduction megathrust fault. The earthquake is thought to have occurred as a result of thrust faulting on the plate interface. The earthquake has a maximum slip of about 2.5 m. The 1950 earthquake essentially the same part of the plate boundary as the 2012 earthquake.

The same area was struck by a M7.7 earthquake in 1950 but had been quiet before the recent earthquake, and the segment of the plate boundary was known as the Nicoya Peninsula seismic gap. In the intervening period, up to 2010, there was an estimated 5 m of missing displacement. Studies determined that the earthquake recurrence interval for the Nicoya Peninsula was about 50 years. The Volcanological and Seismological Observatory of Costa Rica (OVSICORI) stated that the earthquake had released 40% of the energy accumulated during the 8 years before it and did not exclude the possibility of an earthquake of equal or larger magnitude.

== Earthquake ==
The earthquake was felt all over Costa Rica as well as in Nicaragua, El Salvador, and Panama. The maximum intensity reached MM X or higher in Nosara near the epicenter. The shaking had intensities of MM VIII in Santa Cruz and MM V in San José. The recorded acceleration in Fraijanes, Alajuela was larger than that of Nicoya, Guanacaste. A tsunami warning was issued for neighbouring countries along the Pacific Coast shortly afterwards, but later cancelled.

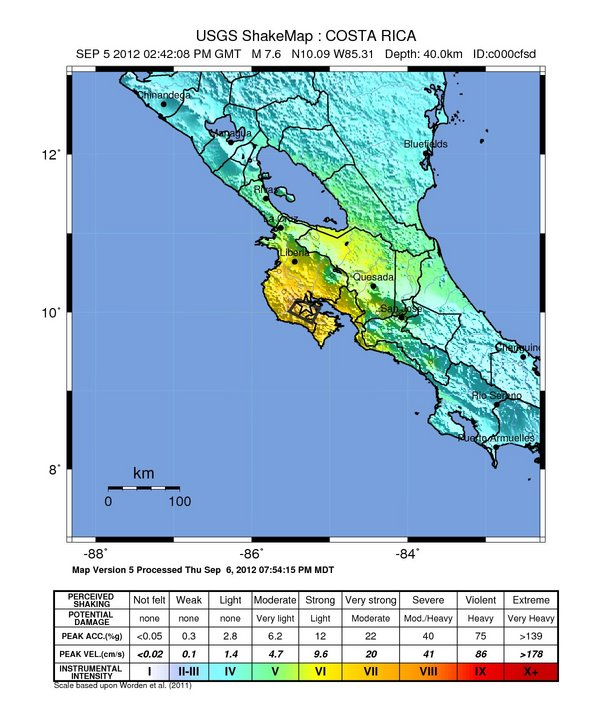
USGS ShakeMap for the event

In neighbouring Nicaragua, the Nicaraguan Institute of Territorial Studies began monitoring the seven active volcanoes in the country, expecting that the strong earthquake could activate them. The country's highest volcano, San Cristóbal Volcano (1,745 metres), erupted on September 8, sending an ash cloud to 5,000 metres and forcing the evacuation of 3,000 people from five communities in the area.

=== Aftershocks ===
Some 1,650 aftershocks occurred in the following five days, including one of 5.4 magnitude, or M_{w} 5.7 by USGS, about 13 km southeast of Playa Sámara on September 8 at 20:29 UTC (14:29 local time), according to OVSICORI, with no further damage or casualties reported.

The most powerful aftershock since the September earthquake, lasting at least 30 seconds and measuring magnitude 6.6, struck at 00:45 UTC on 24 October 2012 (18:45 on 23 October, locally) near the town of Hojancha in the Nicoya Peninsula. In San José, people rushed to the streets out of fear. A thunderous sound accompanying the aftershock was reported by residents in Matapalo.

=== Damage ===
There were reports of homes destroyed in the cantons of Hojancha, Nicoya, Nandayure, and Santa Cruz of the province of Guanacaste. Building damage was reported in San José, including broken windows, cracks on walls, and materials detached from the buildings. In the city center of San José, many people stopped working and grouped on the streets waiting for safety checks for the buildings. In total, at least 169 houses were damaged. Cracks were found at the dyke protecting Filadelfia from the Tempisque River. The Hospital Monseñor Sanabria in Puntarenas suffered damage, and the building was partially closed.

School classes were cancelled for one day in stricken areas and students were evacuated. Fifty-five thousand people were deprived of running water in the provinces of Puntarenas and Guanacaste. A water tank in Filadelfia collapsed. Power losses were reported in some areas in and around the capital city San José and in the Nicoya Peninsula and the Chira Island. GSM and 3G services were interrupted in some places near the epicentre.

== Relief and reconstruction ==
Following the earthquake, the Ministry of Public Education announced that 56 schools in the country would have to be demolished and rebuilt at a preliminary cost of ₡3 billion (US$6 million). The final bill will be higher, however, because many other schools suffered lesser damage which also requires repair. The Costa Rican Red Cross deployed emergency teams with about 205 members and 66 vehicles. According to a preliminary estimation from the Costa Rican government, the earthquake caused a loss of about ₡22.36 billion (US$44.8 million). Facing the damage, the president of Costa Rica expressed the need of a loan from the World Bank.

== See also ==
- List of earthquakes in 2012
- List of earthquakes in Costa Rica
