= Geology of Costa Rica =

The geology of Costa Rica is part of the Panama Microplate, which is slowly moving north relative to the stable Caribbean Plate.

In the late Cretaceous, an oceanic trench or back-arc system formed in connection with a subduction zone, situated where the Isthmus of Panama is now located. Into the early Paleogene, deep sea, open ocean sediments and basalt lava accumulated in the backarc. Volcanic activity was intense in the Cretaceous, Paleocene and Eocene. The volcanic arc that built up during the period overthrust onto the southern margin of North America.

During the Oligocene, the offshore Pacific Plate fragmented into the Cocos Plate and Nazca Plate, divided by the east-west Colon spreading ridge. The tectonics of Costa Rica are more complicated because the Cocos Plate subdivided into two blocks separated by the Costa Rica Fracture Zone (running northeast onto land), with the northern block being subducted. Submarine canyons have been used to infer the path of the Panama Fracture Zone running along the coast creating wrench faults. On the Osa Peninsula, the Nicoya Complex preserves oceanic crust with basaltic lava, dolerite, gabbro, limestone, chert and argillite, obducted onto land before the Oligocene and then rearranged by Miocene wrench faults.

In the Neogene, the low angle subduction of the Cocos Plate led to volcanism in the now extinct Cordillera de Aguacate chain in the center of the country. The Valle Central basin formed as volcanism shifted northeastward in the Quaternary. In the Pleistocene, calderas ejected huge quantities of silica-rich ash, filling the Valle Central basin, affecting the Tarcoles Gorge and generating the Orotina debris fan at the coast. Streams rearranged and flowed more toward the Pacific, downcutting existing channels.

In the past two million years, Costa Rican volcanoes have erupted andesite, rhyolite and dacite with geochemical patterns that suggest the magma may have come from the melting of metamorphosed basalt.

Marine geologists have found mound-like structure offshore due to subduction related fluid venting. A lack of chlorine suggests a freshwater origin.
