= Tsunami earthquake =

Type of earthquake which triggers a tsunami of far-larger magnitude

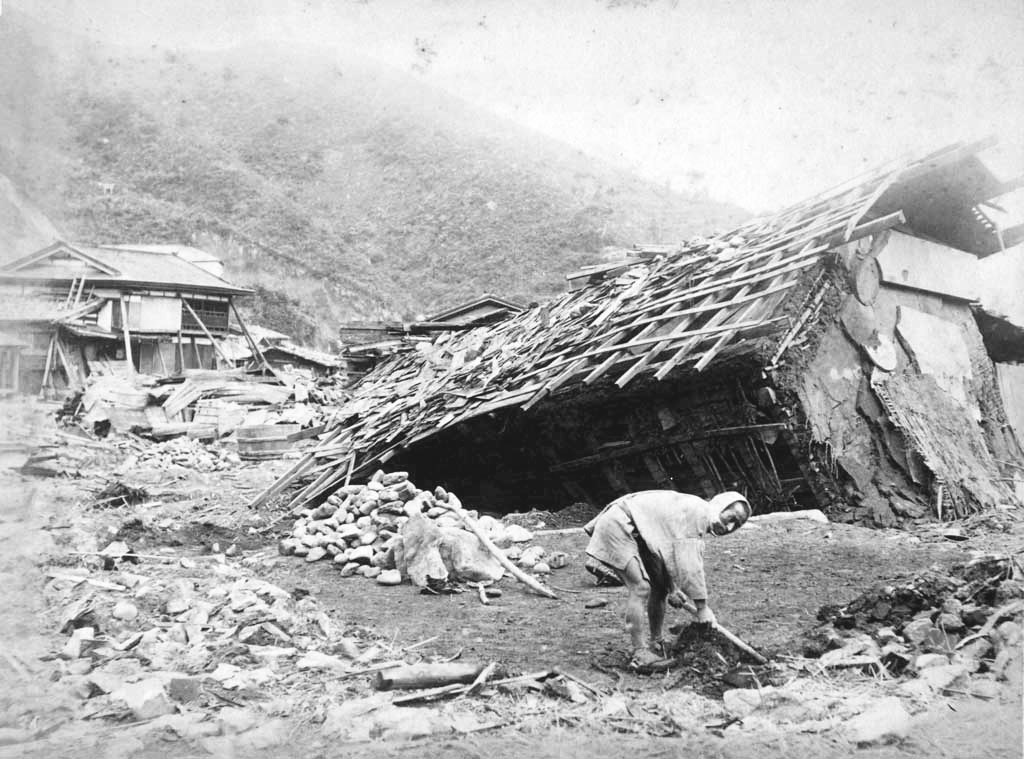
The 1896 Sanriku earthquake was a typical tsunami earthquake

A tsunami earthquake is an earthquake which triggers a tsunami of significantly greater magnitude, as measured by shorter-period seismic waves. The term was introduced by Japanese seismologist Hiroo Kanamori in 1972. Such events are a result of relatively slow rupture velocities. They are particularly dangerous as a large tsunami may arrive at a coastline with little or no warning.

== Characteristics ==
The distinguishing feature for a tsunami earthquake is that the release of seismic energy occurs at long periods (low frequencies) relative to typical tsunamigenic earthquakes. Earthquakes of this type do not generally show the peaks of seismic wave activity associated with ordinary events. A tsunami earthquake can be defined as an undersea earthquake for which the surface-wave magnitude M_{s} differs markedly from the moment magnitude M_{w}, because the former is calculated from surface waves with a period of about 20 seconds, whereas the latter is a measure of the total energy release at all frequencies. The displacements associated with tsunami earthquakes are consistently greater than those associated with ordinary tsunamigenic earthquakes of the same moment magnitude, typically more than double. Rupture velocities for tsunami earthquakes are typically about 1.0 km per second, compared to the more normal 2.5–3.5 km per second for other megathrust earthquakes. These slow rupture speeds lead to greater directivity, with the potential to cause higher run-ups on short coastal sections. Tsunami earthquakes mainly occur at subduction zones where there is a large accretionary wedge or where sediments are being subducted, as this weaker material leads to the slower rupture velocities.

== Cause ==
Analysis of tsunami earthquakes such as the 1946 Aleutian Islands earthquake shows that the release of seismic moment takes place at an unusually long period. Calculations of the effective moment derived from surface waves show a rapid increase with decrease in the frequency of the seismic waves, whereas for ordinary earthquakes it remains almost constant with frequency. The duration over which the seabed is deformed has little effect on the size of the resultant tsunami for times up to several minutes. The observation of long period energy release is consistent with unusually slow rupture propagation velocities. Slow rupture velocities are linked to propagation through relatively weak material, such as poorly consolidated sedimentary rocks. Most tsunami earthquakes have been linked to rupture within the uppermost part of a subduction zone, where an accretionary wedge is developed in the hanging wall of the megathrust. Tsunami earthquakes have also been linked to the presence of a thin layer of subducted sedimentary rock along the uppermost part of the plate interface, as is thought to be present in areas of significant topography at the top of the oceanic crust, and where propagation was in an up-dip direction, possibly reaching the seafloor.

== Identifying tsunami earthquakes ==
Standard methods of giving early warnings for tsunamis rely on data that will not typically identify a tsunami earthquake as tsunamigenic and therefore fail to predict possibly damaging tsunamis.

== Examples ==
=== 1896 Sanriku ===
On 15 June 1896 the Sanriku coast was struck by a devastating tsunami with a maximum wave height of 38.2 m, which caused more than 22,000 deaths. The residents of the coastal towns and villages were taken completely by surprise because the tsunami had only been preceded by a relatively weak shock. The magnitude of the tsunami has been estimated as M_{t}=8.2 while the earthquake shaking only indicated a magnitude of M_{s}=7.2. This discrepancy in magnitude requires more than just a slow rupture velocity. Modelling of tsunami generation that takes into account additional uplift associated with deformation of the softer sediments of the accretionary wedge caused by horizontal movement of the 'backstop' in the overriding plate has successfully explained the discrepancy, estimating a magnitude of M_{w}=8.0–8.1.

=== 1992 Nicaragua ===
The 1992 Nicaragua earthquake was the first tsunami earthquake to be recorded with a broad-band seismic network.

=== Other tsunami earthquakes ===
- 1605 Nankai earthquake
- 1677 Bōsō earthquake
- 1771 Great Yaeyama earthquake
- 1791 Okinawa earthquake
- 1907 Sumatra earthquake
- April 1923 Kamchatka earthquake and tsunami
- 1934 Santa Cruz earthquake
- 1932 Jalisco earthquakes
- 1946 Aleutian Islands earthquake
- November 1960 Peru earthquake
- 1963 Kuril Islands earthquake
- 1965 Vanuatu earthquakes
- 1975 Kuril Islands earthquake
- 1982 Tonga earthquake
- 1994 Java earthquake
- 1996 Chimbote earthquake
- 2002 Guerrero earthquake – A M_{w} 6.7 earthquake off the coast of Mexico failed to trigger country's earthquake warning system due to its extremely low peak acceleration. The near-trench earthquake ruptured the Guerrero Gap and may have generated an anomalously large tsunami.
- 2006 Pangandaran earthquake and tsunami
- 2010 Mentawai earthquake and tsunami
- 2012 El Salvador earthquake
- 2013 Solomon Islands earthquake
- 2015 Torishima earthquake – A moderate M_{w} 5.7 earthquake near Tori-shima generated waves with a maximum amplitude of 0.5 meters at Hachijō-jima.
- 2021 South Sandwich Islands earthquakes
- 2022 Bengkulu earthquake — M_{w} 7.3 event ruptured the shallow portion of the megathrust up-dip of a M_{w} 8.4 rupture in 2007.

== See also ==
- Kaikoura Canyon landslide tsunami hazard
