= List of earthquakes in Nicaragua =

This is a list of earthquakes in Nicaragua which directly impacted the country.

== Earthquakes ==
Notable earthquakes in the history of Nicaragua include the following:

Date	Location	Mag.	MMI	Deaths	Injuries	Notes
2022-04-21	Carazo	6.6 M_{w}	V			Minor damage
2014-10-14	Gulf of Fonseca	7.3 M_{w}	VII	4	Several	
2014-04-10	Managua	6.1 M_{w}	VI	1	266	
2012-08-27	Usulután	7.3 M_{w}	V	0	40+	Major tsunami higher than 6 m in El Salvador.
2000-07-06	Masaya	5.4 M_{w}	VI	7		
1993-11-22	Carazo	5.9 M_{w}	V	1		Death caused by heart attack.
1992-09-02	León	7.7 M_{w}	III	116		Major tsunami up to 8 m (26 ft)
1972-12-23	Managua	6.3 M_{w}	IX	4,000–11,000	20,000	Extreme damage
1968-01-08	Managua	4.8 M_{s}				Moderate damage
1956-10-24	Managua	7.2 M_{w}	VII			Buildings damage
1951-08-02	Cosigüina	5.8		1,000		
1931-03-31	Managua	6.1 M_{w}	VI	1,000–2050		Conflagration
Note: The inclusion criteria for adding events are based on WikiProject Earthquakes' notability guideline that was developed for stand alone articles. The principles described also apply to lists. In summary, only damaging, injurious, or deadly events should be recorded.
