= Earthquake early warning system =

Alert system for in-progress earthquakes

An animation detailing how earthquake warning systems work: When P waves are detected, the readings are analysed immediately, and, if needed, the warning information is distributed to advanced users and cell phones, radio, television, sirens, and PA systems/fire alarm systems before the arrival of S waves.

An earthquake early warning (EEW) system is a system of accelerometers, seismometers, communication, computers, and alarms that is devised for rapidly notifying adjoining regions of a substantial earthquake once one begins. This is not the same as earthquake prediction, which is currently not capable of producing decisive event warnings.

== Time lag and wave projection ==
An earthquake is caused by the release of stored elastic strain energy during rapid sliding along a fault. The sliding starts at some location and progresses away from the hypocentre in each direction along the fault surface. The speed of the progression of this fault tear is slower than — and distinct from — the speed of the resultant pressure and shear waves, with the pressure wave travelling faster than the shear wave. The pressure waves are always smaller in amplitude than the damaging shear waves that are the most destructive to structures, particularly buildings that have a resonant period similar to those of the radiated waves. Typically, these buildings are around eight floors in height. These waves will be strongest at the ends of the slippage, and may project destructive waves well beyond the fault failure. The intensity of such remote effects are highly dependent upon local soils conditions within the region, and these effects are considered in constructing a model of the region that determines appropriate responses to specific events.

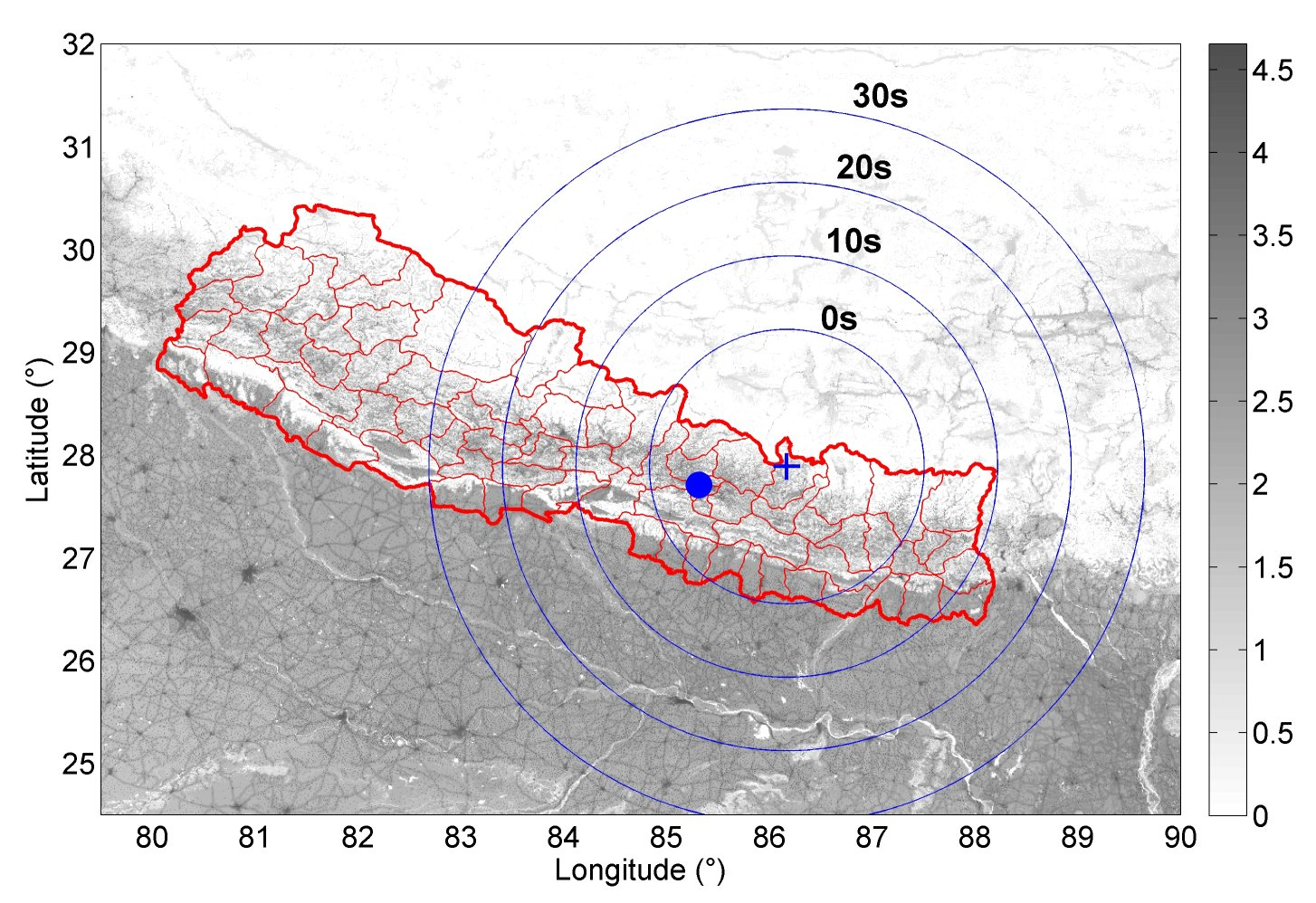
Warning time given by the earthquake warning system of the Earthquake Network project during the May 2015 Nepal earthquake. The cross marker depicts the earthquake epicentre, while the dot marker shows the detection location.

== Deployment ==
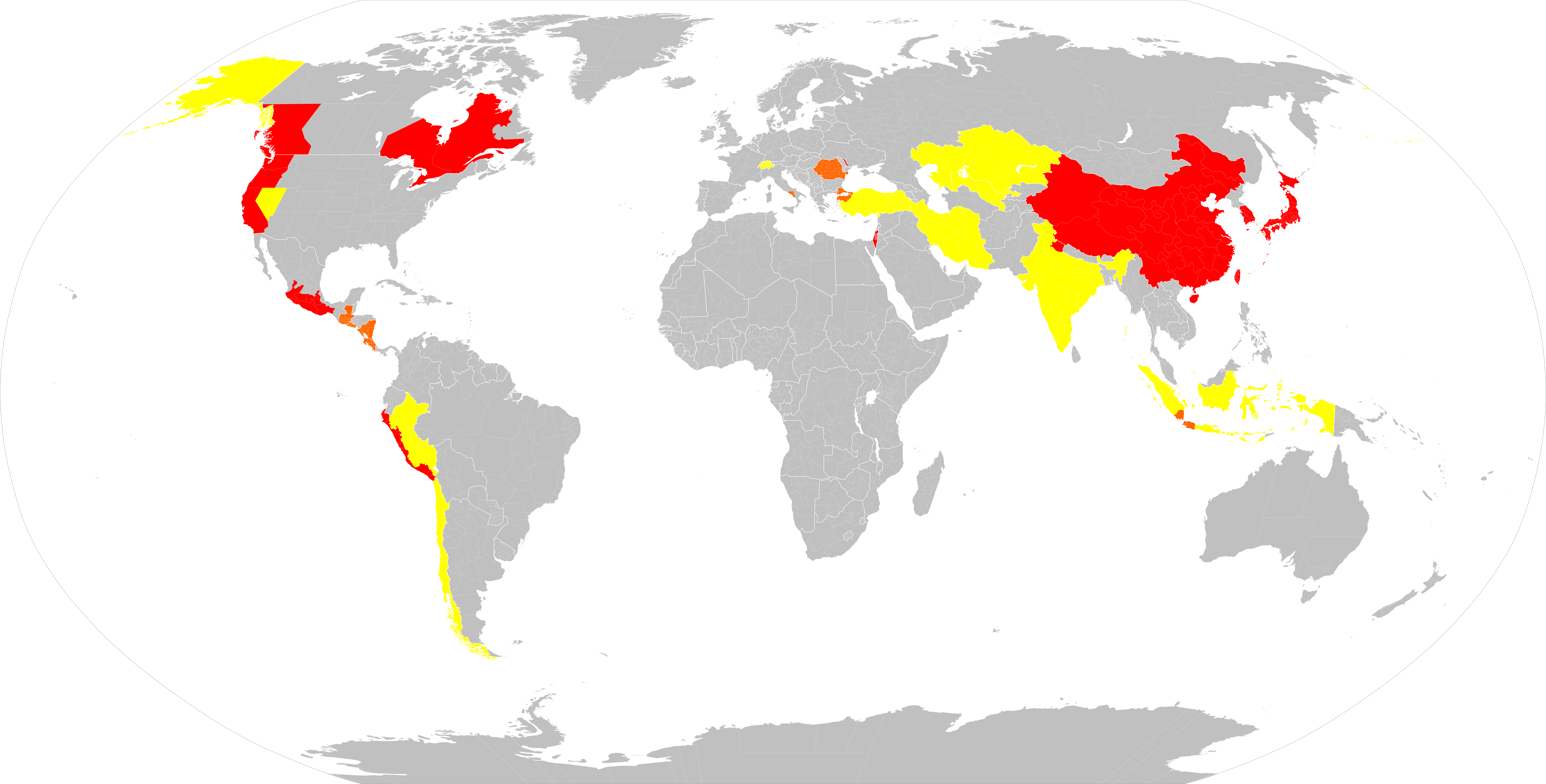
Deployment of earthquake early warning systems Public alert system (e.g., EAS/WEA/Cell-Broadcast, TV, Radio, Sirens) Opt-in or limited-access systems (e.g., optional app or reserved for select groups) Systems in development

As of January 2026, China, Japan, Taiwan, South Korea, Israel and Transnistria have comprehensive, nationwide earthquake early warning systems that notify people in the affected areas via Cell Broadcast (CB), TV alerts, radio announcements or via public address systems/civil defence sirens. Mexico, the United States, Canada, and India have regional earthquake warning systems which notify people using similar technologies. In particular, the Mexican Seismic Alert System covers areas of central and southern Mexico, including Mexico City and Oaxaca; ShakeAlert covers California, Oregon, and Washington in the United States and British Columbia, Ontario and Quebec in Canada; and India's only covers Uttarakhand state.

Countries such as Guatemala, El Salvador, Nicaragua and Costa Rica have deployed systems that alert only specific users through applications that have to be installed individually on their smart devices, while Indonesia and Turkey are currently publicly testing similar opt-in systems. Romania and Italy have systems reserved for other purposes. Systems are currently being developed and internally being tested in Switzerland, Chile, Greece, Peru and Iran.

Alerting methods used by country
Country	Cell Broadcast	TV alerts	Radio alerts	PA/Sirens	Mobile app	Desktop app
Nationwide systems
Japan	Yes	Yes	Yes	Yes	Unofficial	Unofficial
Taiwan	Yes	Yes	—N/a	Unofficial	Yes	Unofficial
South Korea	Yes	Yes	Yes	—N/a	—N/a	Unofficial
China	No	Yes	—N/a	Yes	Yes	Unofficial
Israel	Yes	Yes	Yes	Yes	Yes	Unofficial
Transnistria	Yes	—N/a	—N/a	—N/a	—N/a	—N/a
Regional systems
Mexico	Yes	Yes	Yes	Yes	Unofficial	Unofficial
United States	Yes	—N/a	—N/a	No	Yes	No
Canada	Yes	Yes	Yes	No	Yes	No
India	No	No	No	Yes	Yes	No
Peru	No	No	No	Yes	No	No
Opt-in systems or reserved
Guatemala	No	No	No	No	Yes	No
El Salvador	No	No	No	No	Yes	No
Nicaragua	No	No	No	No	Yes	No
Costa Rica	No	No	No	No	Yes	No
Indonesia	—N/a	—N/a	—N/a	—N/a	Alpha testing	—N/a
Turkey	—N/a	—N/a	—N/a	—N/a	Alpha testing	—N/a
Romania	Reserved					
Italy	Reserved					

=== Nationwide systems ===
==== Japan ====
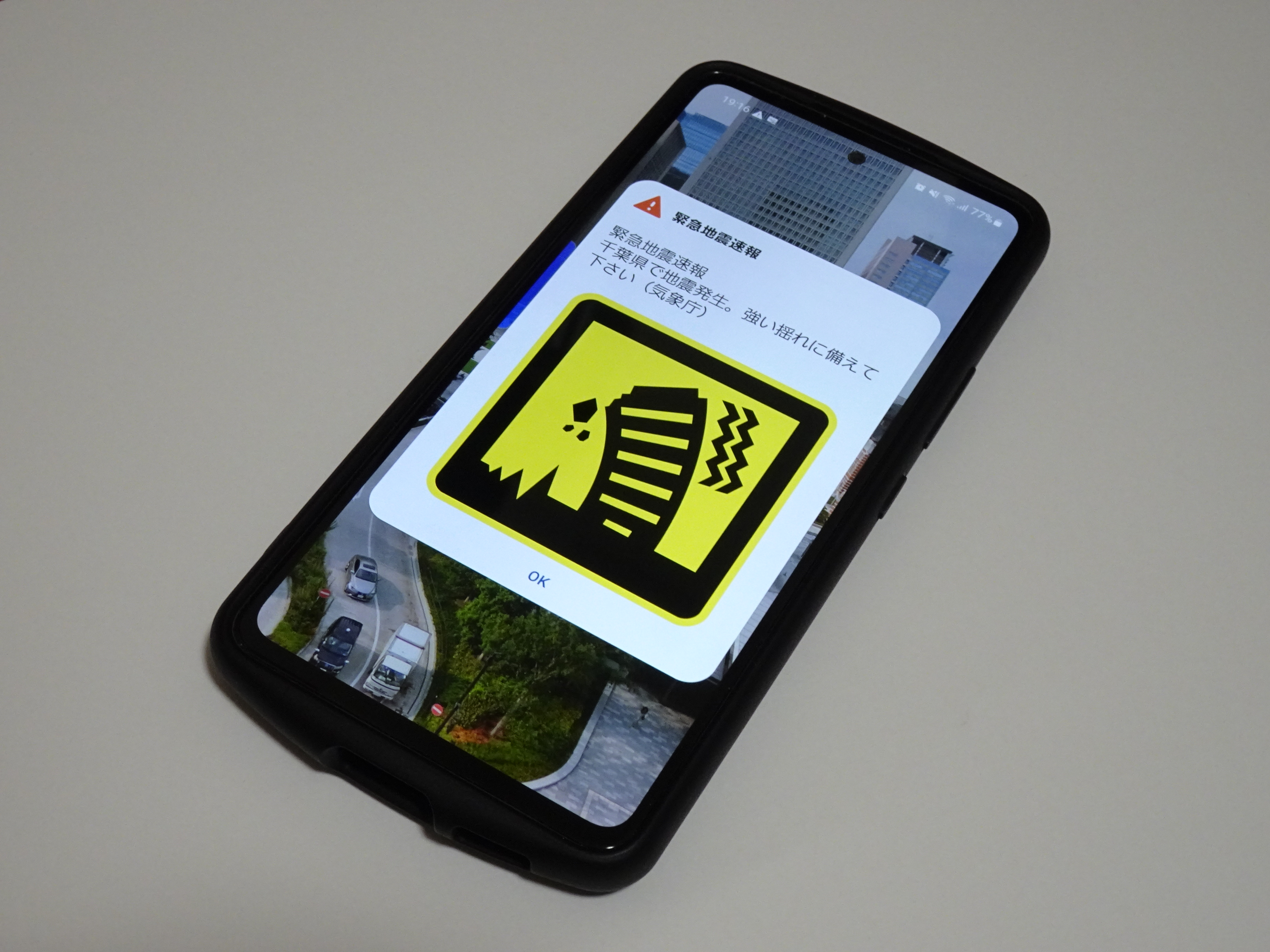
A Japanese EEW issued via Cell-Broadcast

Japan's Earthquake Early Warning system (Japanese: 緊急地震速報, romanized: Kinkyū Jishin Sokuhō) was tested beginning in 2004 and became fully operational on October 1st, 2007, making it the first nationwide earthquake early warning system to enter service. The system was developed by the Japan Meteorological Agency (JMA) in cooperation with the National Research Institute for Earth Science and Disaster Resilience (NIED) and other institutions, was partly based on the earlier Urgent Earthquake Detection and Alarm System (UrEDAS) developed by Japan Railways (JR) in the 1990s, which was designed to trigger automatic braking of Shinkansen trains in the event of nearby seismic activity. While UrEDAS was limited in geographic scope and intended for infrastructure safety, the JMA's EEW system expanded this concept to include nationwide coverage and public alerts via television, radio, mobile phones, and other communication systems.

Following the 2011 Tōhoku earthquake, researchers used gravimetric data to observe prompt elastogravity signals (PEGS), changes in Earth's gravity field generated by the earthquake. These signals travelling at the speed of light, significantly faster than seismic waves, have been used to explore new models that could improve EEW lead times. Although still experimental, PEGS-based approaches represent a potential advancement in early detection, particularly for large-magnitude events.

Japan's EEW system is advanced relative to the world, often updated with new algorithms to improve accuracy and reduce false alarms, new sensor networks, and integration into infrastructure and automated response systems.

==== Taiwan ====
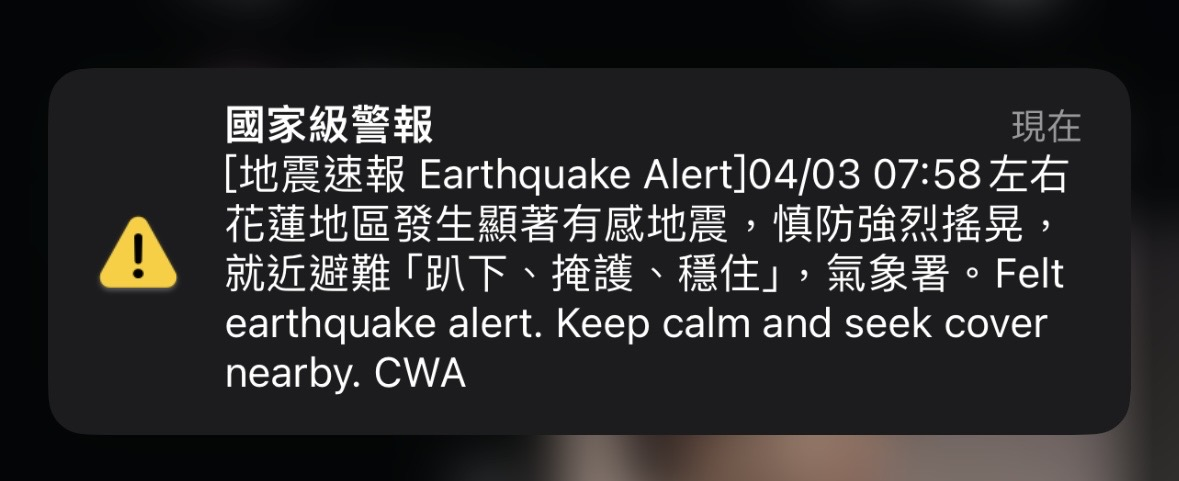
Taiwanese EEW issued on an iPhone device during the 2024 Hualien earthquake

Taiwan's Earthquake Early Warning system was developed by the Central Weather Administration (CWA) in collaboration with academic institutions such as the Institute of Earth Sciences, Academia Sinica, and the National Center for Research on Earthquake Engineering (NCREE). The program began after the devastating 1999 Chi-Chi earthquake, which killed over 2,400 people and highlighted the need for rapid alerts to mitigate casualties.

Initial work focused on research and internal alert capabilities began in 2001. The first operational version of the EEW system was launched for limited institutional use in 2009, and after a period of testing and upgrades, the system became publicly operational in 2014, becoming the second country in the world, after Japan, to implement a nationwide earthquake early warning system.

==== South Korea ====
South Korea's Earthquake Early Warning system is operated by the Korea Meteorological Administration (KMA), which has been developing earthquake monitoring and early warning capabilities since the early 2010s. Following Japan and Taiwan, South Korea became the third country to establish a nationwide EEW system, officially introducing it in 2015.

Although South Korea experiences fewer and generally less intense earthquakes compared to Japan and Taiwan, seismic activity has increased in recent years, including notable events such as the 2016 Gyeongju earthquake and the 2017 Pohang earthquake which heightened public awareness and demonstrated the practical need for such a system.

==== Israel ====
Israel has been developing its Earthquake Early Warning system in response to seismic risks posed by the Dead Sea Transform fault zone, which runs along the country's eastern border. Although the region experiences relatively infrequent large earthquakes, historical records show several damaging events, such as the 1927 Jericho earthquake and the 1995 Gulf of Aqaba earthquake, prompting growing concerns about preparedness.

The country's EEW efforts are led by the Geological Survey of Israel (GSI) and the Israel Defense Forces (IDF), in coordination with the Home Front Command. In 2014, Israel launched a pilot EEW project designed to detect seismic waves in real time using a network of seismic sensors along the Jordan Rift Valley.

In 2022, Israel officially operationalized TRUAA as a public alert system integrated with its national emergency infrastructure. With this rollout, Israel became the fourth country in the world, after Japan, Taiwan, and South Korea, to implement a nationwide earthquake early warning system.

On October 31, 2024 residents across northern Israel, including Haifa, the Golan Heights, and Galilee, received an earthquake warning, however, the warning was later confirmed to be a false alarm, triggered by a controlled explosions in southern Lebanon during the Israel–Hezbollah conflict. The Geological Survey of Israel stated that the system's sensors had misinterpreted the shockwaves from the blasts as the initial seismic waves of an earthquake. The first eathquake warning in a real scenario was issued on January 14th 2026, after a 4.2 earthquake struck near Dimona prompting alerts in the Negev Region. A second, was issued on 11 November 2026, following a magnitude 4.5 earthquake near Eilat, prompting sirens to sound in surrounding settlements in the Arabah Valley and leading to the evacuation of Ramon Airport.

==== China ====
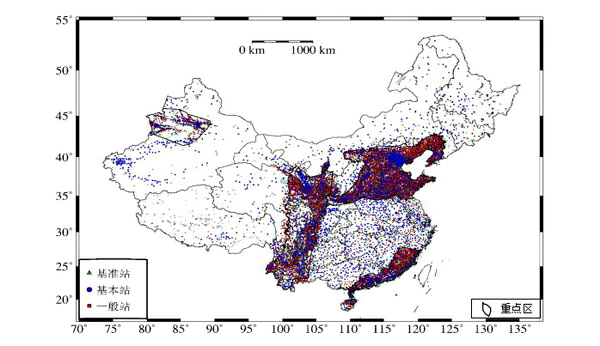
EEW station distribution used in China's national earthquake early warning system

China has been actively developing earthquake early warning capabilities since the early 2000s, led primarily by the China Earthquake Administration (CEA) and the Chengdu-based Institute of Care-life (ICL). The devastating 2008 Sichuan earthquake, which resulted in nearly 80,000 deaths and massive destruction, stimulated China's investment in nationwide earthquake early warning systems as well as the founding of the ICL.

Unlike Japan, Taiwan, or South Korea, China's system did not begin as a single centralized effort. Instead, it developed regionally, notably in Sichuan and Yunnan provinces, where seismic risk was the highest, and combined into a single unique system starting from 2018. The first operational public EEW alerts were issued in Sichuan in 2011, using localized networks.

In 2024, China announced the completion of the world's biggest earthquake early warning system capable of providing alerts across all mainland China, becoming the fifth country to do so. Although China's nationwide system came after Japan, Taiwan and South Korea, it has rapidly grown to become the largest and most technologically ambitious EEW efforts globally, particularly in terms of geographic scale and integration with public infrastructure: it's composed by 16,000 monitoring stations, managed by 3 national centres, 31 provincial centres, and 173 prefectural and municipal centres.

==== Transnistria ====
In 2025, Interdnestrcom (IDC), the main telecommunications provider in the unrecognized territory of Transnistria, successfully launched an earthquake early warning. This made Transnistria the sixth territory worldwide (despite its unrecognized status) to deploy a nationwide EEW system, following Japan, Taiwan, South Korea, Israel, and China.

=== Regional systems ===
==== Mexico ====
Mexico's Earthquake Early Warning system began development following the 1985 Mexico City earthquake. In 1993, Mexico City issued what is considered the first earthquake early warning ever delivered to the public, marking the beginning of operational of the system. A second system was later developed for the state of Oaxaca in 2000 after the 1999 Oaxaca earthquake. In 2005, both systems were integrated into a unified national network known as the Mexican Seismic Alert System (SASMEX), managed by the Centro de Instrumentación y Registro Sísmico (CIRES).

Although SASMEX is the oldest EEW system currently in operation, its coverage remains limited to specific regions of the country (Colima, Guerrero, Jalisco, Mexico, Mexico City, Michoacán, Morelos, Oaxaca, Puebla, Tlaxcala). Warnings are currently disseminated via radio, public sirens, dedicated receivers and TV Alerts. In 2025 CIRES began testing cell-broadcast alerts, and became operational in 2026.

==== United States ====
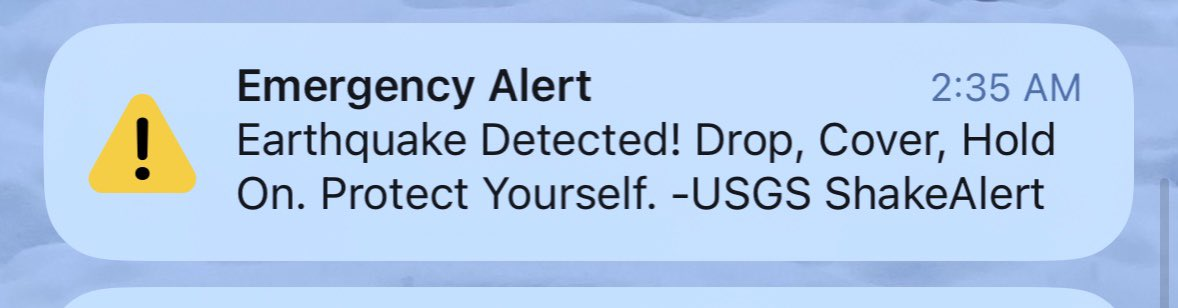
EEW issued by ShakeAlert on iOS during the 2022 Ferndale earthquake

The earliest automated earthquake pre-detection systems were installed in the 1990s; for instance, in California, the Calistoga fire station's system which automatically triggers a citywide siren to alert the entire area's residents of an earthquake. Some California fire departments use their warning systems to automatically open overhead doors of fire stations before the earthquake can disable them.

The United States Geological Survey (USGS) began research and development of an early warning system for the West Coast of the United States in August 2006, and the system became demonstrable in August 2009. Following various developmental phases, USGS announced version 2.0 of ShakeAlert which went live during the autumn of 2018, marking the beginning of public alerting capability across California, Oregon and Washington.

ShakeAlert was designed to issue alerts seconds before significant ground shaking, enabling automatic responses in systems such as urban rail networks. It has been integrated into infrastructure operated by the train operator in urban rail systems such as BART (Bay Area Rapid Transit) and LA Metro, to trigger automatic train stopping in the event of nearby seismic activity.

Although the system became technically capable of issuing alerts to the public in September 2018, distribution of those alerts was delayed until public and private partners developed appropriate dissemination channels. The first publicly accessible alert was issued through the ShakeAlertLA mobile application, released in December 2018, which provided warnings specifically for the Los Angeles area. On 17 October 2019, California Governor's Office of Emergency Services (Cal OES) announced a statewide rollout of the alert distribution system in California, using the MyShake mobile app and the Wireless Emergency Alerts (WEA) system. California refers to its system as the California Earthquake Early Warning System. A statewide alert distribution system was rolled out in Oregon on 11 March 2021 and in Washington on 4 May 2021, completing the alert system for the West Coast.

ShakeAlert remains in active development, with ongoing expansion of its coverage in particular in other earthquake-prone regions of the United States such as Alaska and Nevada.

==== Canada ====
In 2009, an early warning system called ShakeAlarm was installed and commissioned in Vancouver to protect the George Massey Tunnel, which connects the north and south banks of the Fraser River. The system was designed to automatically close tunnel gates in response to incoming strong ground shaking.

On 29 August 2024, the Canadian Earthquake Early Warning system was launched in British Columbia by Natural Resources Canada (NRCan). Alerts generated by this system are delivered to the public via the country's National Public Alerting System (Alert Ready). The early warning system was developed in cooperation with the United States Geological Survey (USGS) and is based upon USGS's ShakeAlert system. While the two systems are distinct, USGS and NRCan share processing software, algorithms, and real-time data.

On 27 November 2025 NRCan expanded the system to Quebec and Ontario.

==== India ====
Uttarakhand, a seismically active state in northern India, has implemented an earthquake early warning system known as the Uttarakhand State Earthquake Early Warning System (UEEWS). Developed by the Indian Institute of Technology Roorkee (IIT Roorkee) in collaboration with the Uttarakhand State Disaster Management Authority, the system was launched in 2021. Warnings are disseminated through a dedicated mobile application called BhuDev and through sirens installed in government buildings and public areas.

The Indian government is currently planning to develop more systems in other regions of the country.

==== Peru ====
Peru's earthquake early warning system, known as the Sistema de Alerta Sísmica Peruano (SASPe), is developed and operated primarily by the Instituto Geofísico del Perú (IGP) in collaboration with the Instituto Nacional de Defensa Civil (INDECI), CENEPRED, and the Ministry of Defense. The system is designed to provide alerts for large subduction earthquakes (with magnitude ≥ 6.0) along the country's coastal regions, where seismic risk is highest due to the convergence of the Nazca and South American tectonic plates.

The development of SASPe gained momentum following major international earthquakes, particularly the 2007 Pisco earthquake in Peru, the 2010 Chile earthquake, the 2011 Tōhoku earthquake in Japan, and the 2017 Mexico earthquakes. These events highlighted the value of early warning systems. In response, the IGP initiated technical and scientific discussions with government institutions. Budgetary approval was secured in 2019–2020 through the Ministry of Economy and Finance (MEF). The first phase focused on installing the system along the entire Peruvian coast.

The system consists of a dedicated network of 111 strong-motion stations installed along the Peruvian coast (with an average spacing of about 30 km). It uses the Ensemble Earthquake Early Warning System (E3WS) algorithm, which can issue the first alert using only 3 seconds of P-wave data from the nearest station. After more than four years of testing, the system has shown highly accurate magnitude estimates with few false positives and false negatives. Lead times range from approximately 8 seconds for areas close to the epicenter (within ~57 km) to 10–20 seconds for more distant coastal populations (70–120 km).

SASPe is the first nationwide earthquake early warning system in South America. It became publicly available on May 29, 2026, following a major national multi-hazard simulation drill in which the system's sirens were activated nationwide for the first time as part of a full-scale public test. Currently the public dissemination is handled only through sirens.

=== Opt-in systems or reserved ===
==== Costa Rica, El Salvador, Guatemala and Nicaragua ====
The countries of Costa Rica, El Salvador, Guatemala and Nicaragua, in cooperation with the Swiss Seismological Service at ETH Zürich, developed a regional earthquake early warning initiative known as ATTAC (Alerta Temprana de Terremotos en América Central). Launched in 2016 and supported by the Swiss Agency for Development and Cooperation, the project aimed to establish national systems using harmonized seismic instrumentation and open-source softwares, however each participating country operates its own independent system.

Initial system deployments took place between 2020 and 2022 and by 2024 all four countries had launched operational systems primarily delivering alerts to the public via mobile applications. ATTAC represents the first coordinated effort to implement earthquake early warning and continues to serve as a model for regional cooperation in seismic risk mitigation.

==== Romania ====
Romania operates an earthquake early warning system focused on the Vrancea seismic zone, one of Europe's most active sources of intermediate-depth earthquakes. The system was developed and is maintained by the National Institute for Earth Physics (NIEP). The system is designed to provide early warnings to critical infrastructure in Bucharest. These warnings are primarily used to trigger protective measures at key facilities, including shutdowns of sensitive equipment and alerts to emergency management agencies. The system is not yet integrated with a nationwide public alerting platform, but efforts to expand and modernize its reach continue.

==== Italy ====
In June 2025, Rete Ferroviaria Italiana (RFI) launched an operational earthquake early warning system on the Rome–Naples high-speed railway. Developed in collaboration with the University of Naples Federico II and with technical support from Japan's Railway Technical Research Institute, the system covers approximately 211 km of rail. The system uses dedicated accelerometers and a private fiber-optic communication network to detect and assess seismic activity in real time. When ground motion exceeds established thresholds, automated safety protocols are activated to slow down or stop trains, interfacing directly with the railway's signaling infrastructure.

==== Indonesia ====
Indonesia's effort to develop a dedicated earthquake early warning system reflects both its extreme seismic vulnerability along the "Ring of Fire" and the lessons learned from past catastrophic events. While the Meteorology, Climatology, and Geophysical Agency (BMKG) has long run InaTEWS (Indonesia Tsunami Early Warning System) since 2008, it was designed primarily for tsunami warnings and over the years was tested as an earthquake warning system, but did not disseminate such data to the public. To close this gap, BMKG began developing InaEEWS. In 2019, BMKG partnered with China's Institute of Care‑Life (ICL), to install sensors in high-risk zones such as the Sunda Strait, West Java, Banten, and Sumatra. The ICL technology, which was instrumental in establishing China's vast EEW network, was implemented to complete Indonesia's early warning capabilities. The system's capabilities were internally tested for the first time during the 2022 Cianjur earthquake.

In 2025, BMKG launched its prototype EEWS in four pilot regions, Jakarta, Banten, West Java, and Lampung, through the alpha testing of its InaEEWS Mobile app, reserved for Android users. The system is supported by approximately 228 sensors, including accelerometers and intensity meters, and is capable of issuing early warnings to participating users.

Between 2022 and 2025, the system evaluated 143 earthquake events, achieving a success rate of around 88.8% for issuing timely warnings in the pilot zones.

As of November 2025, BMKG continues testing their system, as mass alerting to the general public via smartphones, such as push notifications directly to users' devices, is not yet fully implemented.

==== Turkey ====
Turkey's earthquake early warning system is developed and operated by the Boğaziçi University and the Kandilli Observatory and Earthquake Research Institute, and is focused on the high-risk Marmara Region, which lies along the North Anatolian Fault Zone and poses a significant seismic threat to Istanbul and surrounding areas.

KOERI's efforts in earthquake early warning dates back to the late 1990s. In 2001, a prototype system with ten strong-motion stations was established in the Marmara region, alongside a rapid damage assessment network. The system saw major modernization starting in 2012, with upgrades to the station network, data transmission infrastructure, and communication latency.

The system underwent its first significant real-world internal test during the October 2025 Marmara Sea earthquake. It issued the initial alert 8.4 seconds after the earthquake origin time, after seismic waves reached onshore stations approximately five seconds after rupture. Due to the absence of seafloor sensors in the Sea of Marmara, an unavoidable delay of roughly six seconds occurs for offshore events. Authorities have since planned and installed submarine sensors to reduce warning times to between three and six seconds.

For public dissemination, KOERI developed an iOS-based mobile application called Kandilli Uyarı. As of late 2025, the app entered alpha testing with approximately 2.500 devices, most belonging to researchers and scientists. An Android version is under development, alongside expansion of the low-latency seismic network nationwide and improvements to backend infrastructure for delivering alerts simultaneously to large numbers of users.

=== Global crowdsourced systems ===
==== Earthquake Network ====
In January 2013, Francesco Finazzi, a researcher at the University of Bergamo, initiated the Earthquake Network research project which aims to develop and maintain a crowdsourced earthquake warning system based on smartphone networks.

The core concept behind the project is to use smartphones as seismic sensors to detect ground shaking caused by earthquakes. When an earthquake occurs, the network of participating smartphones, which are stationary and connected to a power supply, detects the seismic activity in real-time and as soon as the system identifies an earthquake, it immediately issues warnings to users who are located near the earthquake's epicenter. This can provide crucial seconds or even minutes of advance notice, allowing people to take protective actions before the damaging seismic waves reach their location.

The Earthquake Network project represents a cost-effective and scalable approach to earthquake early warning, especially in regions where traditional earthquake early warning systems are unavailable.

==== MyShake ====
In February 2016, the Berkeley Seismological Laboratory at University of California, Berkeley (UC Berkeley) released the MyShake mobile app, which, similarly to the Earthquake Network app, uses accelerometers in phones that are stationary and connected to a power supply to record ground motion and relay that information back to the laboratory.

The original intention of the MyShake App was to be a "global smartphone seismic network" using the accelerometers in phones to issue EEW alerts. Currently, MyShake issues alerts generated by the ShakeAlert system that calculates a quick estimate of an earthquake's magnitude and location from seismometers. These alerts are available for users in California, Oregon, and Washington for earthquakes with a magnitude estimate of 4.5 and greater to areas expected to receive MMI 3 shaking or greater. The data collected by the MyShake app is used for research including ground motion modeling and vibration analysis of buildings.

==== Android Earthquake Alerts System ====
On 11 August 2020, Google announced the integration an earthquake detection system Android Earthquake Alerts System into Android using accelerometers embedded in millions of Android smartphones worldwide. By leveraging this network of devices, Google aimed to create one of the largest earthquake detection systems ever, capable of identifying seismic events through real-time data collected directly from users' phones.

Initially, the system focused on gathering earthquake data rather than issuing alerts. For users on the U.S. West Coast, however, the system provided earthquake warnings based on the official ShakeAlert warning issued by the United States Geological Survey (USGS), rather than using Google's own detection algorithms. During this phase, the data collected from Android devices helped deliver near-instant information about nearby earthquakes via Google Search and other services, improving public awareness and response times.

On 28 April 2021, Google announced the rollout of the alert system to Greece and New Zealand, the first countries to receive alerts based on Google's own detection capabilities. Google's alerts were extended to Turkey, the Philippines, Kazakhstan, Kyrgyzstan, Tajikistan, Turkmenistan, and Uzbekistan in June 2021. In September 2024, Google announced their warnings would now cover the entire United States (including areas not monitored by USGS's ShakeAlert). In 2025 earthquake alerts could be delivered to 98 other countries.

Despite these advances, the Android Earthquake Alerts System has faced criticism. Notably, during the devastating 2023 Turkey–Syria earthquakes, the BBC reported that the system failed to issue warnings, as no one in the affected areas had received it. Google denied these claims, maintaining that the system had functioned as intended. However, in a 2025 research paper, the company confirmed that the system had significantly underestimated the earthquake's magnitude: the algorithm incorrectly assessed the 7.8-magnitude quake as being between 4.5 and 4.9 instead. As a result, it issued mostly lower-level "Be Aware" alerts, which are just simple notifications, instead of the highest-priority "Take Action" warnings, which are designed to override silent mode, do not disturb mode, and appear as full-screen pop-up that plays a distinct sound to ensure users receive loud and immediate alerts. As a result, only about 469 "Take Action" alerts were sent, while approximately 10 million people should have received them.

In February 2025, the system was disabled in Brazil after issuing a false earthquake warning in São Paulo and Rio de Janeiro. The warning, had reported a nonexistent 5.5 magnitude earthquake in the Ubatuba and Baixada Santista area, which was not confirmed by local authorities.

The New York Times reported that during the 2026 Venezuela earthquakes, the system sent alerts to approximately 11.4 million users. Those alerts included almost 1.4 million high-priority "Take Action" alerts.

== See also ==
- Earthquake engineering
- Earthquake preparedness
- P wave
- Seismic retrofit
