= Diego Melgar =

Geodesist and seismologist

Diego Melgar Moctezuma is a geodesist and seismologist. He is a professor of Earth sciences at the University of Oregon, where he holds the Ann and Lew Williams Chair in Earth Sciences, and is the founding director of the Cascadia Region Earthquake Science Center (CRESCENT). His research concerns the physics of large earthquakes, tsunami modeling, and earthquake and tsunami early warning systems.

== Education ==
Melgar received a B.Eng. in geophysics from the National Autonomous University of Mexico (UNAM) in 2009, and an M.S. (2010) and Ph.D. (2014) in geophysics from the Scripps Institution of Oceanography at the University of California, San Diego.

== Career ==
After completing his doctorate, Melgar was a postdoctoral fellow and then a research geodesist at the Berkeley Seismological Laboratory at the University of California, Berkeley, where he worked on the geodetic component of ShakeAlert, the earthquake early warning system for the United States West Coast. He joined the Department of Earth Sciences at the University of Oregon in 2017 and was promoted to full professor in 2026. He has held the Ann and Lew Williams Chair in Earth Sciences, an endowed named chair at the university, since 2021.

In 2023 he became the founding director of the Cascadia Region Earthquake Science Center, a research center funded with an initial US$15 million award from the National Science Foundation to study earthquake hazards at the Cascadia subduction zone. The center comprises researchers at fourteen universities and research institutions and is headquartered at the University of Oregon.

Melgar has served on the National Academies of Sciences, Engineering, and Medicine Committee on Solid Earth Geophysics and on the board of directors of the Seismological Society of America. In 2020 he was appointed by the NOAA Administrator to the Tsunami Science and Technology Advisory Panel, a statutory panel established under the Tsunami Warning, Education, and Research Act of 2017 that advises NOAA on tsunami science and preparedness. He is a member of the California Earthquake Prediction Evaluation Council, an advisory body to the California Governor's Office of Emergency Services that evaluates earthquake forecasts and predictions.

== Research ==
Melgar works as both a geodesist and a seismologist. His research combines Global Navigation Satellite System (GNSS) measurements with seismic data to characterize earthquake ruptures, including in real time for early warning applications. He has published source models of major earthquakes, including the 2015 Gorkha earthquake in Nepal, the 2017 Tehuantepec earthquake in Mexico, and the 2023 Turkey–Syria earthquake doublet, and has studied the 1700 Cascadia earthquake using tsunami and coastal deformation records. He appears regularly in English- and Spanish-language media as an expert on earthquake and tsunami hazards in the Pacific Northwest.

== Awards and honors ==
- Charles F. Richter Early Career Award, Seismological Society of America (2016)
- John Wahr Early Career Award, American Geophysical Union, Geodesy Section (2022)
- GEO Distinguished Lecturer, U.S. National Science Foundation (2024)

== Selected publications ==
- Galetzka, J.; Melgar, D.; Genrich, J. F.; et al. (2015). "Slip pulse and resonance of the Kathmandu basin during the 2015 Gorkha earthquake, Nepal". Science. 349 (6252): 1091–1095. doi:10.1126/science.aac6383.
- Melgar, D.; Ruiz-Angulo, A.; Spica, Z.; et al. (2018). "Deep embrittlement and complete rupture of the lithosphere during the M8.2 Tehuantepec earthquake". Nature Geoscience. 11: 955–960. doi:10.1038/s41561-018-0229-y.
- Allen, R. M.; Melgar, D. (2019). "Earthquake early warning: Advances, scientific challenges, and societal needs". Annual Review of Earth and Planetary Sciences. 47: 361–388. doi:10.1146/annurev-earth-053018-060457.
- Melgar, D. (2021). "The January 26th, 1700 Cascadia earthquake as part of an event sequence". Journal of Geophysical Research: Solid Earth. 126 (10). doi:10.1029/2021JB021822.
- Melgar, D.; Taymaz, T.; Ganas, A.; et al. (2023). "Sub- and super-shear ruptures during the 2023 Mw 7.8 and Mw 7.6 earthquake doublet in SE Türkiye". Seismica. 2 (1). doi:10.26443/seismica.v2i3.387.
