= Randy Falco =

American media executive

- Born: December 26, 1953 (age 72)
- Occupation: Media executive

Randel A. Falco (born December 26, 1953) is an American media executive. Falco was president and CEO of Univision Communications Inc. from June 2011 until retiring in June 2018. Before joining Univision in January 2011 as executive vice president and COO, he served as chairman of the board and CEO of AOL from November 2006 to March 2009. Prior to his tenure at AOL, he spent 31 years at NBC, including serving as the network's president and COO.

== Career ==
=== NBC ===
Falco began his career at NBC in September 1975. In 31 years with the network, he held several managerial positions in finance, technical operations, and corporate strategic planning. From 1986 to 1991, he served as Vice President of Finance and Administration, NBC Sports. In 1993, Falco was named President of NBC's Broadcast and Network Operations division. He oversaw the facilities and operations of the NBC Television Network worldwide, where he oversaw the design and creation of the Today Show's "Window on the World" studio, MSNBC's state-of-the-art broadcast facilities in Secaucus, N.J., and the digital conversion of the NBC Television Network. He also served as a GE officer.

==== NBC-Universal ====
Falco played a key role in the NBC-Universal merger, leading him to be named President of the NBC Universal Television Network Group in 2004. Following the merger, Falco combined the ad sales operations of NBCU's broadcast and cable units – the first major media company to take that approach. He was named president and chief operating officer of the NBC Universal Television Group in December 2005. Falco was responsible for the group's commercial and operational functions, including affiliate relations and Telemundo.

==== Reverse Affiliate Compensation ====
In February 2000, Falco negotiated the first reverse compensation deal by one of the major broadcast networks. The agreement, “an astonishing reversal of the network compensation policy,” was a 10-year, $362 million deal with Granite Broadcasting that turned KNTV into the NBC affiliate serving San Francisco and San Jose. This approach changed the model so that affiliates would pay the networks for their programming – not the other way around, as had been customary. Falco made the arrangement work for both parties by finding “new revenue streams to be shared by network and stations.”

==== Olympic Games ====
Beginning with the 1992 Barcelona Olympics, Falco played a key role in NBC's ongoing success with the Olympic Games. He worked alongside NBC Sports Chairman Dick Ebersol to secure exclusive NBC coverage for five consecutive Olympic Games: 2000, 2002, 2004, 2006, 2008. In his book “Olympic Turnaround,” Michael Payne described the NBC deal to secure the Games as a “coup” that left the other networks “speechless.” The NBC deal with the International Olympic Committee signed December 12, 1995 at $2.3 billion for three Games was “the biggest broadcast deal in sports history” at the time.

Falco served as COO for the 2002 Winter Olympics, the 2000 Summer Olympic, the 1996 Summer Olympics, and the 1992 Summer Olympics, winning multiple Emmy Awards for these broadcasts.

=== AOL ===
After 31 years with NBC, Falco became chairman and chief executive officer of AOL in November 2006. As CEO he set strategy and oversaw operations as the company transitioned to an advertising-focused business model. In this restructuring, Falco made 16 strategic acquisitions, eliminated $2.5 billion in costs and moved AOL's headquarters from Dulles to Manhattan. The restructuring also included a series of three workforce restructures. In 2007, a year into his tenure at AOL, Falco was named the recipient of the Frank Stanton Award, honoring excellent leadership in the media field.

Under Falco, AOL acquired social networking website Bebo for $850 million in 2008, but a few months later global financial markets imploded and Bebo's value dropped.

AOL later sold Bebo to Criterion Capital Partners in 2010 for an undisclosed sum which was reportedly under $10 million. In 2009, Falco was replaced as CEO by Google Ad Chief Tim Armstrong.

=== Univision Communications Inc. ===
Falco has been president and CEO of Univision Communications Inc. (UCI) since June 2011 after starting as executive vice president and COO for Univision in January 2011. Since 2011, under Falco's leadership, Univision has increased its earnings. His contract was recently renewed until January 2018. Falco sits on the board of directors of Univision Communications Inc.

As CEO, Falco has said he is focused on making UCI, which is acknowledged by Business Insider as an “extremely important media brand,” the most heavily engaged media brand. Under his leadership, Univision has undergone a company-wide expansion that has included the launch of new networks, including Univision tlNovelas, Univision Noticias, and Univision Deportes, which features soccer matches from the Mexican Primera División and Ligue 1. In 2013, Univision announced the launch of El Rey, a new network geared towards young-adult audiences led by Robert Rodriguez. That year Univision also rebranded its TeleFutura network into UniMás, which targets males ages 18 to 35, broadcasts telenovelas, soccer events, reruns of classic shows and feature films. In the summer of 2013, Falco negotiated Univision's joint venture with ABC/Disney to launch "Fusion", a 24-hour, English-language cable news network.

During his tenure at Univision since 2010, Falco has presided over big, strategic changes that aim to respond to the media disruption that affects the industry. He planted Univision firmly in digital turf by buying Gawker out of bankruptcy for $135 million, purchasing a 40.5% controlling stake in the parent of humor-oriented The Onion for $27 million and forming a video streaming JV with Lionsgate–all in 2016[46]. After the acquisitions, Univisión generates over 100 million monthly unique visitors, one of the largest market shares for media outlets in the United States. After launching Story House, an independent production unit owned by UCI, its first TV series about cartel kingpin "El Chapo" Netflix, received critical acclaim and record ratings. Netflix licensed the series with a second window for Univision that year.

Univision's Galavisión remains the No. 1 Spanish-language cable network. Under Falco, Univision has also forged a partnership with Hulu; started UVideos, a digital online network for streaming content; acquired exclusive multi-year rights to Mexican professional football club Chivas De Guadalajara of Liga MX; and launched several new apps and websites to broaden the distribution of its content across new platforms.

In addition, under Falco, Univision celebrated its 50th anniversary in the fall of 2012 by unveiling a new brand logo and a new tagline identifying Univision as the “Hispanic Heartbeat of America.” In July 2013, Univision announced its quarterly earnings were $40.7 million, 28 percent higher than in 2012. “Our aggressive push to take share from the English-language networks is working,” Falco said.

Under Falco's guidance, Univision developed the UCI Total Reach Score ratings system. Through this new system, Univision has been able to detect an increased audience of 45 million consumers, an increase of 10 percent from 2013.

In 2013, Falco and his team started the award-winning Univision Contigo (Univision With You). Univision Contigo is an initiative that provides the U.S. Hispanic community with access to information and resources focused on education, health, prosperity and participation.

Falco's Univision contract was extended to last through 2020, however, in March 2018, the company announced that he will be retiring by the end of 2018. The retirement announcement came 24 hours after Univision abandoned its long-planned IPO strategy and replaced its CFO.

==== Univision News ====
During Falco's tenure, Univision has expanded its news offerings to Latino audiences. The news division of Univision has increased its emphasis on investigative journalism for which it has attained several recognitions for journalistic excellence, such as the 2012 Peabody Award and IRE Award for its “Fast and Furious” investigation, two Emmy Lifetime Achievement Awards, two Cronkite Award for Excellence in Political Journalism and several prestigious awards for five documentaries produced by the Investigative and Documentary units. Falco was also instrumental in the first Presidential “Meet the Candidates” forums targeted to Hispanic audiences, which featured presidential candidates Barack Obama and Mitt Romney in September 2012 on Univision, as well as in the company's coverage of the unaccompanied minors crisis at the border, which received the Cronkite Award for Excellence in Political Journalism and its second prestigious King of Spain International Journalism Award.

==== Univision ratings milestones ====
In 2013, Univision saw significant ratings milestones. In the February sweeps, the network came in fourth place for the first time with adult demographics while NBC came in fifth. In the July sweeps, Univision came in first in 2013 and 2014. Until 2013, no English-language American broadcast network had been beaten during sweeps.

== Advocacy ==
As Univision CEO, Falco undertook a number of advocacy initiatives on behalf of U.S. Hispanics. In August 2012, noting that “more than 20 million Hispanics could play a critical role in electing the new President of the United States,” Falco called upon the Commission on Presidential Debates to add an additional debate “that will speak directly to this burgeoning audience so influential to the presidential dialogue and outcome.” When the commission rejected Falco's idea, Univision staged its own candidate forums with President Barack Obama and challenger Mitt Romney.

In June 2016, after then-candidate Donald Trump made disparaging remarks about Hispanics in a campaign speech, Falco canceled Univision's agreement to televise the Trump-owned Miss Universe and Miss USA pageants. According to Hollywood Reporter, “As the mainstream media is struggling with how to cover Trump, Falco is positioning Univision squarely as an advocate for its mostly Spanish-speaking audience.”

In September 2016, Falco took on the Commission on Presidential Debates once again. In an open letter to executive director Janet H. Brown, published in Variety, Falco wrote: “I am writing to express disappointment, and frankly disbelief, that the Commission on Presidential Debates has not chosen a Hispanic journalist to moderate the presidential debates. Simply put: it’s an abdication of your responsibility to represent and reflect one of the largest and most influential communities in the U.S.”

In August 2017, following violent race-related clashes in Charlottesville, Virginia, Falco spoke out against the White House response and called upon corporate leaders to act. As reported on deadline.com: “Without mentioning Trump by name, Falco said in an open letter that he opposes the ‘abject failure to clearly and forcefully denounce the actions of white supremacists, Neo-Nazis, and others who espouse racist and hateful views.’ He adds that the ‘current insanity threatens to spiral out of control and has to stop. Leadership is needed. Leaders from corporate America must step in to protect the communities we serve, as so many leaders in our nation’s Capital are failing to speak out forcefully and clearly against the spreading hate and bigotry.’”

Beginning in September 2017, on eight separate occasions Falco took action in support of the Deferred Action for Childhood Arrivals (DACA) program. He told Adweek, “Univision will continue to stand by the thousands of talented DREAMers whose stories are unmistakably American. The loss of DREAMers in our workforce and in our communities will result in significant harm to the success of this great nation and to organizations like Univision that give voice to the underrepresented.” In January 2018, Univision expanded its efforts in support of the DACA program by creating an interactive tool that enables DACA supporters to easily make their voices heard by legislators nationwide to help protect Dreamers and modernize the country's immigration system.

Falco also led Univision's efforts to support those impacted by a series of natural disasters in 2017. On September 23, 2017, a seven-hour telethon, Unidos por los Nuestros (United for Each Other) that aired across the networks of Univision enabled the American Red Cross to raise more than $3 million to assist the survivors and victims of the Mexican earthquakes and Hurricane Maria, as well as ongoing support for communities impacted by Hurricanes Irma and Harvey. In addition, Univision employees traveled to Puerto Rico to deliver shipments of emergency supplies from Univision and some of its business and community partners.

== Awards ==
As part of his job with Univision, Falco has been recognized for his efforts and leadership with issues around children of illegal immigrants in the United States and unaccompanied children at the U.S.–Mexico border following his letter to the U.S. president and legislative leaders, and was awarded the “champion award” by KIND in 2015. The National Academy of Television Arts & Sciences also recognized Falco for his leadership in the industry with the Board of Trustees’ Award, and Cablefax included Randy in its Greatest Hits of for the past three years. In January 2017, Falco was named a recipient of NATPE's 14th Annual Brandon Tartikoff Legacy Awards for demonstrating a high degree of excellence, vision and leadership through the process of creating compelling content. Additionally, in 2013 Falco was named the MS Hope Award honoree by the National MS Society; inducted into the Broadcasting & Cable Hall of Fame; and was also honored by Ballet Hispanico with its Civic Inspiration Award.

In 2018, Falco was awarded an Impact Award by the National Hispanic Media Coalition for his “Outstanding Service and Commitment to the Latino community”.

== Personal life ==
Falco, a native of the Bronx, NY, attended Iona College, where he received his Bachelor of Business Administration in finance in 1975 and his Master of Business Administration, also in finance, in 1979. He received an honorary doctorate from Iona College in 2001. He and his wife Susan have three children. Falco sits on the board of directors of the Ronald McDonald House and is a member of the advisory board of the Smithsonian's National Museum of American History.

Business positions
Preceded by Jonathan Miller	CEO of AOL; 2006–2009	Succeeded by Tim Armstrong
