= Berkeley Seismological Laboratory =

- Network code: BK
- Location: 37.8735°N 122.2610°W
- Elevation: 49 metres (161 ft)
- Networks: Berkeley Digital Seismic Network; High-Resolution Seismic Network
- Source: doi:10.31905/EL3FQQ40

The Berkeley Seismological Laboratory (BSL) is a research lab at the Department of Earth and Planetary Science at the University of California, Berkeley. It was created from the Berkeley Seismographic Stations, a network of regional seismographs with the oldest dating to 1887. In 1962, one of these seismographs was installed on the Berkeley campus under the station name BKS which belonged to the Worldwide Standard Seismographic Network. Following the 1989 Loma Prieta earthquake and subsequent issues with stations resulting from the shaking, an effort was made to replace the seismographs with digital equipment resulting in the formation of the Berkeley Digital Seismic Network. Today, BSL's mission is to "support fundamental research into all aspects of earthquakes, solid earth processes, and their effects on society".

An experimental early warning system developed by BSL issued a warning 10 seconds before the 6.0 magnitude earthquake that hit the Napa region on August 24, 2014. Such a warning system could potentially give people time to take cover in the event of a quake, preventing injuries caused by falling debris, automatically stopping trains or shutting off gas lines. The system, developed in conjunction with the United States Geological Survey (USGS), the California Institute of Technology and the University of Washington, will eventually cover the entire West Coast. The system would cost $80 million in funding to run for five years in California, or $120 million for the whole West Coast. In July 2015, USGS awarded $4 million in funding to the project partners to turn the current ShakeAlert prototype into a more robust system.

== See also ==
- Andrew Lawson
- Earthquake early warning system § MyShake
- Harry O. Wood
