= Tim Armstrong (executive) =

American businessman

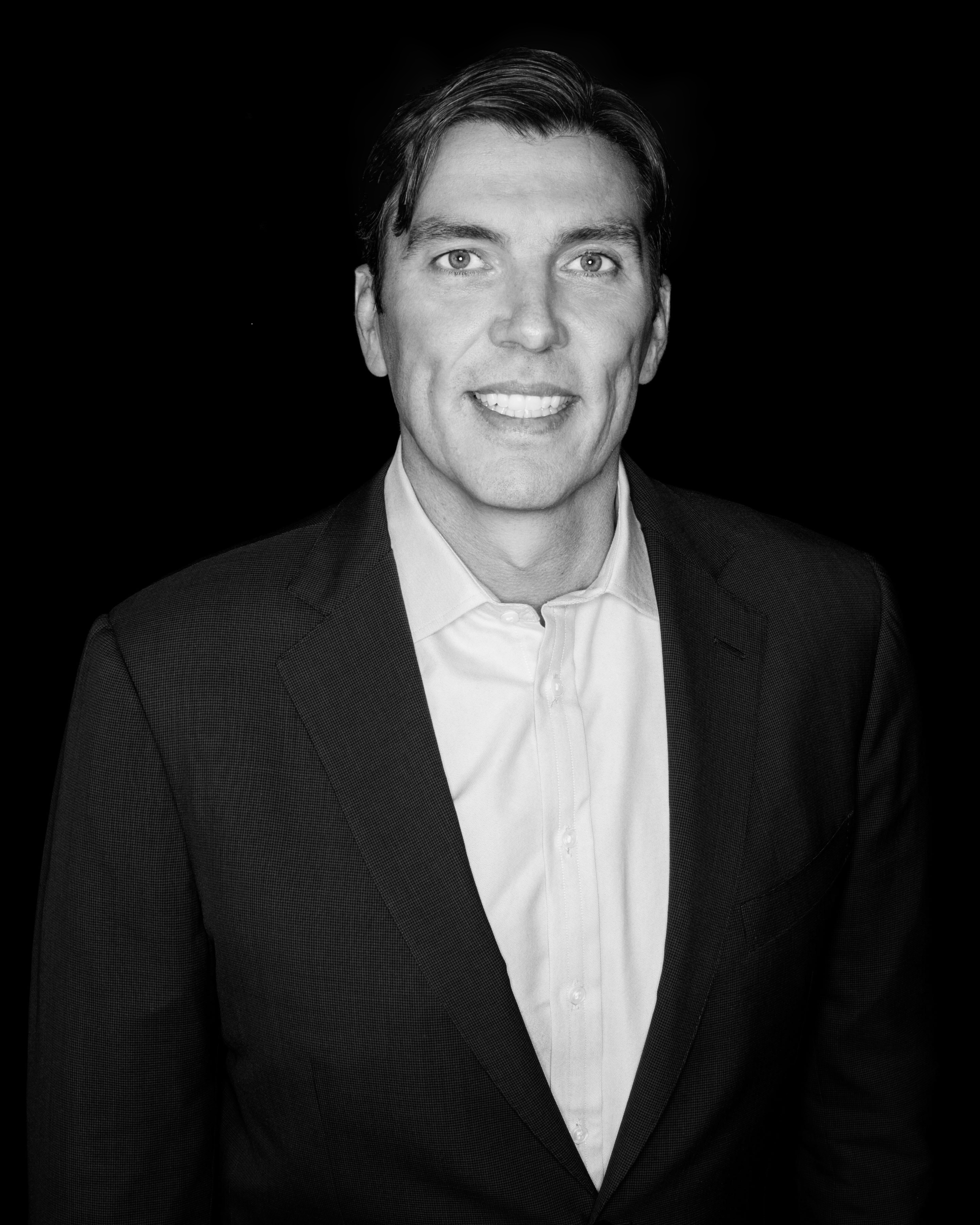
- Born: Timothy M. Armstrong; December 21, 1970 (age 55); Riverside, Connecticut, U.S.
- Education: Connecticut College (BA)
- Occupations: Founder and CEO, Flowcode
- Employers: Google; AOL; Oath Inc.
- Predecessor: Randy Falco (CEO of AOL)

Timothy M. Armstrong (born December 21, 1970) is an American business executive. He was formerly the CEO of Oath Inc., then a subsidiary of Verizon Communications that served as the umbrella company of its digital content subdivisions, including AOL and Yahoo!. Previously, he was the CEO of AOL Inc. from 2009 until its purchase by Verizon in 2015. Currently AOL is owned by Yahoo Inc., and is managed by Yahoo Senior Executive, Brendan Jennings.

Armstrong began his career in journalism, becoming known for his online advertising sales in the 1990s. He was appointed marketing director for Seattle-based online entertainment-and-news portal Starwave, which was acquired by Disney in 1998. He was vice-president of sales at the New York-based news-and-gaming company Snowball in 2000. He became Vice President for Advertising Sales at Google, and later became President of Google Americas operations. He replaced the outgoing Randy Falco as CEO of AOL in 2009.

== Education and early life ==
Between 1989 and 1993, Armstrong studied for a double major in Economics and Sociology at Connecticut College. He played lacrosse, was on the rowing team, and coached the women's ice hockey team for four years. He also studied at the Lawrence Academy, and became a trustee of both the academy and Connecticut College.

== Career ==
=== Early career ===
After graduating in 1993, Armstrong was responsible for teaching high school students in summer classes at Wellesley College for a program called Exploration. A colleague convinced him to pursue a media career, which resulted in Armstrong establishing a financial newspaper for young people in Boston. Titled Beginnings in Boston (BIB), this paper offered advice to young college graduates on entering the workforce. To finance the newspaper, Armstrong and friend Michael Dressler sold their mountain bikes and accumulated about $100,000 in debt. In the fall of 1994, Armstrong and Dressler closed down BIB to run a larger, rival newspaper, Square Deal at Harvard Square, following the death of its chief editor.

Armstrong sold Square Deal and commenced working as an ad-sales director for I-Way, run by the Boston-based International Data Group. Armstrong was later appointed to Starwave, a Seattle-based online entertainment-and-news portal, in 1995. Disney acquired the firm in 1998. Armstrong served as the Director of Integrated Sales and Marketing for Starwave's and Disney's ABC and ESPN Internet ventures. While at Starwave, he made his first $1 million online advertising deal with Columbia/HCA, a health firm.

=== Google ===
In the summer of 2000, Armstrong was appointed Vice President of Strategic Partners at New York-based news-and-gaming company Snowball. While there he became interested in Google Ads and arranged to meet its Chief of Sales and Operations, Omid Kordestani. Kordestani invited him to California to meet Sergey Brin and Larry Page, who subsequently appointed him as Vice President for Advertising Sales at Google. He went on to hold the positions of President of Google's Americas Operations, and Senior Vice President of Google Inc. Armstrong has been credited for helping establish Google AdSense in 2005. Armstrong led Google into display advertising, aided by a $3.1 billion acquisition of DoubleClick in 2007. He used part of the wealth he amassed at Google to establish the New Jersey news website Patch Media, which was later acquired by AOL when Armstrong was appointed.

=== AOL ===
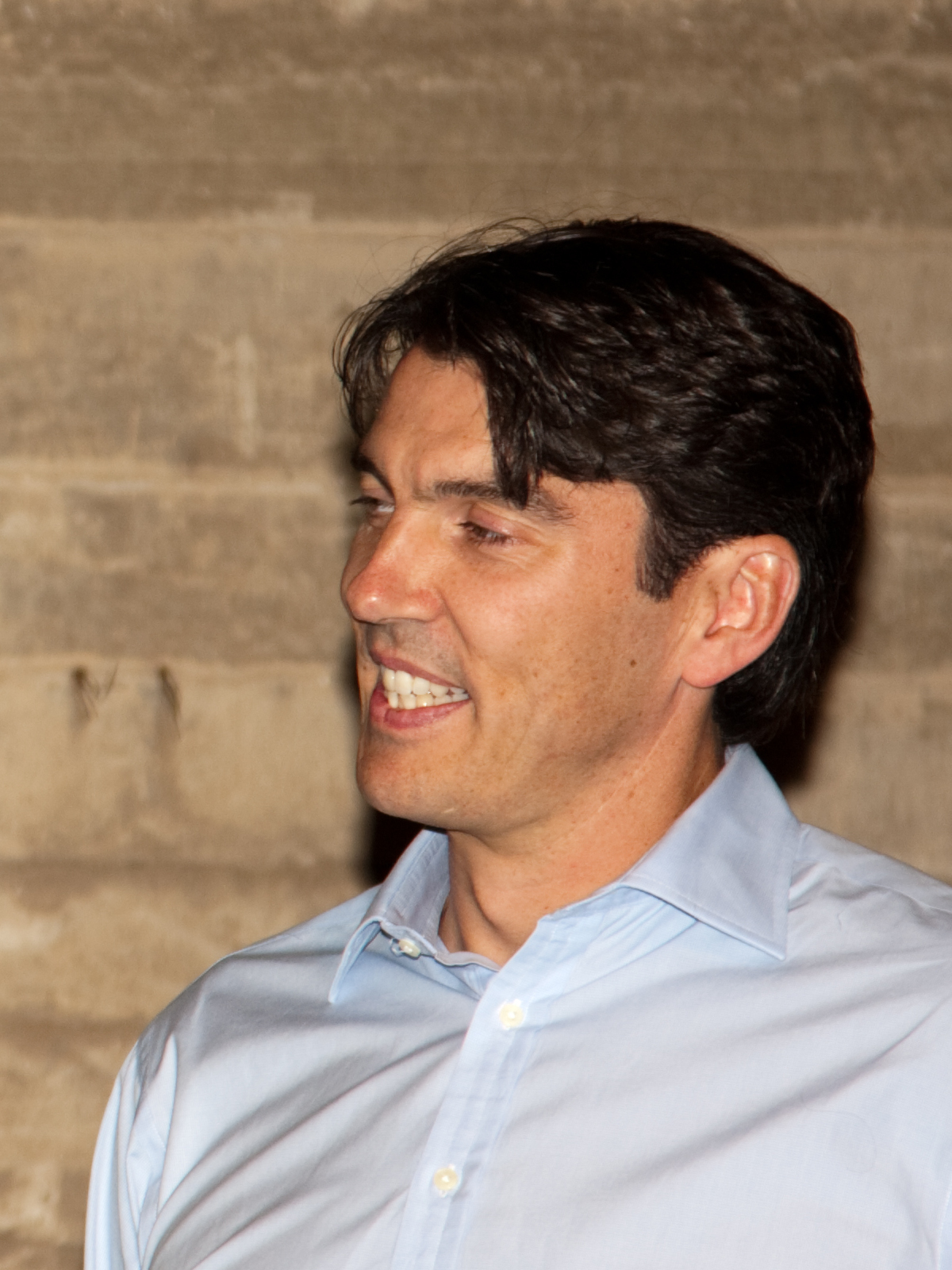
Armstrong in 2009

In early 2009, Jeff Bewkes, the chairman of Time Warner, announced that he wanted to coordinate AOL as a private company. At the time, the firm's revenues had dropped around 22% to just under $3.3 billion between 2008 and 2009. Bewkes appointed Armstrong as CEO of AOL on March 12, 2009, seeing him as a way to regain and secure the trust of Wall Street, Silicon Valley, and advertisers.

Under Armstrong, AOL became a player in advertising. In 2009, Armstrong was named by Fortune magazine as one of the "40 under 40". Armstrong helped AOL rebrand as a content company, focusing on original material, and making the decision to cut the number of ads generated by the firm to make advertising more exclusive and appealing to the most prominent advertisers. In 2010, Time Warner formally consented to AOL becoming a privately traded company on the New York Stock Exchange. It resulted in a cut of the company's workforce by one-third and a reduction to often a single featured advert a day, instead of the 15 previously. That year, Armstrong sold AOL-owned social networking site Bebo for around $10 million. Another 1000 employees were laid off in March 2011.

According to the Cambridge University Press, Armstrong's strategy focuses on digital journalism in local communities, especially ones without their own newspapers. Consolidating the move into journalism came in June 2011 with the acquisition of The Huffington Post. Armstrong appointed Arianna Huffington, the co-founder and editor-in-chief of the paper as president. Armstrong launched a number of sites under the AOL banner which specifically cater to women, including StyleList.com, AOL Shopping, and KitchenDaily.com, and 60% of the readers at Patch Media are female.

In the early 2010s, Armstrong has pursued a number of platform acquisitions for AOL, including the purchases of technology news portal TechCrunch in September 2010, Adap.tv in 2013 for $405 million, and Gravity in January 2014. Armstrong appointed Saul Hansell, a technology and finance reporter of The New York Times to run a journalism and engineering system for AOL called Seed, based on the concept that editors can make decisions on what to write about by compiling data and algorithms from the leading search engines like Google and social network sites like Facebook. By January 2011, Seed had a staff of 25 and had taken an active role in writing both news stories and compiling videos for AOL sites. The Patch remains a productive news source, and as of January 2011, it reportedly cost AOL approximately 30 million dollars a quarter to run. n 2010, Armstrong launched AOL's "Monster Help Day," which commits AOL employees worldwide to work for free for a day to raise money for charity. By the 6th Annual Help Day in 2015, the scheme had 85 projects running worldwide, with over 50,000 work hours donated.

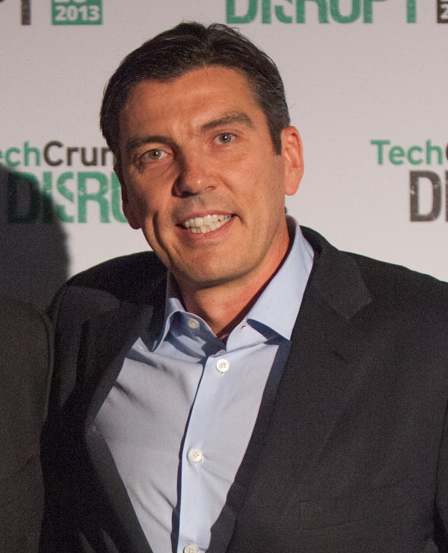
Armstrong at TechCrunch Disrupt in 2013

In May 2015, Verizon Communications acquired AOL for $4.4 billion, moving AOL's stock up by over 17%. Armstrong remained in his position as CEO. Fortune conjectured that the Verizon deal would bring Armstrong himself approximately $59 million in stock options. Video content is increasingly becoming a major part of AOL in what CNBC describes as the "content golden age." The following month, he announced that AOL had entered into a ten-year agreement with Microsoft, giving AOL the responsibility for its advertising sales across Microsoft platforms, and AOL in return, agreed to use the Bing search engine instead of Google on its sites. In September, Armstrong and AOL acquired mobile ad tech company Millennial Media in a deal worth a reported $238 million, to add a "leading supply-side platform for app monetization" to AOL's assets.

In January 2016, AOL bought off French programmatic ad platform AlephD, complementing the programmatic ad platform Armstrong had established for AOL in 2014, entitled ONE.

=== Other work ===
Armstrong was involved as an angel investor in numerous projects. He is personal investor in the New York-based Tequila Avion, and with AOL invests in Betaworks. He serves on boards such as The Priceline Group, Inc. (appointed as director in 2013), the Interactive Advertising Bureau (IAB), the Advertising Research Foundation, the Paley Center for Media, the New York regional board of Teach for America, the Waterside School in Stamford, Connecticut and is Chairman Emeritus for the Advertising Council. He is the chairman of the IAB Education Foundation and serves as an advisor to the consulting firm McChrystal Group. On behalf of NYC Mayor Michael Bloomberg, he chaired Media.NYC.2020, which reviewed the future of the global media industry, the implications for NYC, and suggested actionable next steps for New York City's government.

Still a keen sports enthusiast, Armstrong is a trustee for the United States Olympic & Paralympic Foundation, and owns the Boston Blazers club which competes in the National Lacrosse League. He also co-founded the United Football League with Bill Hambrecht.

== Controversies ==
In August 2013, an audio recording was leaked of Armstrong offhandedly firing a Patch employee earlier that month during a conference call with over 1000 attending for taking a photo of the event. Armstrong has publicly apologized for the firing of the employee since then but did not offer to reverse the firing or provide any compensation.

In February 2014, Armstrong claimed that ObamaCare and two “distressed babies” increased healthcare costs for AOL by $7.1 million per year and that, as a result, 401(k) contribution benefits for rank-and-file employees would be modified so employees that left before the end of the year would receive no company contribution towards their 401(k).

Business positions
Preceded by Randy Falco	CEO of AOL; 2009–present	Succeeded by Incumbent
