= ICL Earthquake Early Warning System =

Chinese seismic alert system

The ICL Earthquake Early Warning System is a earthquake early warning system (EEWS) developed by the Institution for Care-Life of Chengdu, China. As an early warning system, it is designed to identifiy and alert nearby population of earthquakes before the arrival of seismic waves. Alerts are sent to mobile phones via cellular network, to computers via Internet, through radio, television, and dedicated receiving terminals. Several stations were built as part of the National Intensity Rapid Reporting and Earthquake Early Warning Project, and as of March 2016, the system covered 2.2 million square kilometers and reached 90% of the population in seismically active and densely populated regions, making it the largest earthquake early warning system in the world at the time.

== Development ==
The development of ICL EEWS was led by Dr. Wang Tun, a Chinese physicist who had been conducting research in Austria before returning to China, driven by the absence of an earthquake early warning system during the 2008 Sichuan earthquake. At the time, skepticism surrounded the feasibility of building an effective warning system, and only seven people initially joined Wang’s team. They established the Institution for Care-Life and began their research in a residential community in Shuangnan, Chengdu.

The project’s initial funding totaled 3 million yuan, which Wang borrowed from various sources. Within a year, the funds were depleted, placing considerable financial strain on the team. At one point, members had to rely on their personal savings to keep the project afloat. As the system prototype progressed, the team gradually secured financial support, including a government subsidy of 200,000 yuan and a special grant from China's Ministry of Science and Technology. In 2011, an additional 3 million yuan in funding was obtained, easing the team’s financial burdens.

By 2012, the ICL had developed core technologies for earthquake early warning and rapid intensity reporting. The team successfully created an integrated hardware and software system with proprietary intellectual property rights. In September 2012, the system passed an evaluation organized by the Sichuan provincial government, which recognized it as being “at the domestic advanced level.”

On December 21, 2019, the Institute of Mechanics of the Chinese Academy of Sciences signed a strategic cooperation agreement with the ICL and appointed ICL founder Wang as a visiting researcher.

== Operation ==
Earthquake early warning refers to issuing alerts after an earthquake has occurred but before severe damage is caused. The principle behind this is that after an earthquake occurs at the epicenter, the destructive seismic waves take some time to reach surrounding areas. Because electromagnetic waves travel faster than seismic waves, the system can convert seismic wave data detected by intensity meters into electromagnetic signals, issuing warnings seconds to tens of seconds before the seismic waves arrive.

Through monitoring, analyzing, and synthesizing seismic waveforms, the ICL EEWS can generate warning alerts and disseminate them via mobile phones, computers, radio, television, and dedicated receiving terminals. The system incorporates earthquake early warning technologies from both China and other countries—especially Japan—and features significant innovations. It also employs several world-first technologies, such as the integration of on-site and remote methods, as well as intensity-based audio alerts.

== Application ==
=== Regions ===
The ICL EEWS was first deployed in 2012 in the aftermath of the 2008 Sichuan earthquake, initially targeting areas along the Sichuan–Yunnan border. By 2014, it had expanded to 15 provinces and municipalities across mainland China, covering nearly one million square kilometers. As of March 2016, the system had been implemented in 31 provincial-level divisions, including Sichuan, Yunnan, Shaanxi, and Gansu. Its coverage area reached 2.2 million square kilometers and encompassed 90% of the population in seismically active and densely populated regions, making it the largest EEWS in the world.

With the implementation of this system, China became the third country globally—after Mexico and Japan—to acquire the capacity to issue public earthquake warnings. In 2014, the ICL EEWS was exported to Haiti. A year later, in 2015, a similar system was constructed in Nepal through a partnership between the ICL and the Nepal Academy of Science and Technology.

=== Target users ===
==== Government and Infrastructure ====
Since 2014, the ICL EEWS has been adopted by numerous disaster response and emergency management agencies, including the National Disaster Reduction Center of the Ministry of Civil Affairs, the Sichuan Emergency Management Office, the Yunnan Emergency Management Office, and the Sichuan Fire and Rescue Corps. Nearly 20 official government social media platforms, such as those operated by Sichuan Public Security, have used the system to disseminate earthquake alerts.

The system has also been embedded into critical infrastructure. All public schools in Chengdu’s High-Tech Zone are covered by the EEWS, enabling real-time alerts to be broadcast via campus speaker systems. In 2014, the Chengdu Metro adopted the system, allowing trains to automatically slow to 25 km/h or stop upon receiving an alert. It has also been implemented across vital infrastructure such as gas pipelines, high-speed railways, and chemical plants. In high-density areas or major engineering projects, dedicated terminals are encouraged to reduce casualties by delivering immediate warnings to primary and secondary users.

On Aug. 15, 2019, the ICL and Indonesia's Meteorology, Climatology, and Geophysical Agency (BMKG) announced a joint construction project to install EEWS in Sunda Strait, West Java, Banten and some provinces on Sumatra island, identified as earthquake-prone areas, aiming at completing Indonesia's system which only served for tsunami warning system.

==== Public ====
The ICL EEWS was first adopted by television broadcasters in April 2012. During an earthquake, participating TV channels automatically display pop-up warnings and countdowns before seismic waves arrive.

On May 22, 2019, the ICL and Beijing Kuyan Interactive Technology Co., Ltd. signed a cooperation agreement to launch China’s first internet-based large-screen earthquake early warning information system, which has since been integrated into smart TVs from manufacturers such as Skyworth, Konka, Changhong, and LeEco. It is also supported by outdoor display terminals from NewTV Media and Nongguang Media. When triggered, these devices issue real-time visual and audio alerts, marking a major step in the integration of early warning systems with smart home technology, beyond traditional channels like mobile apps and broadcast media.

In November 2019, ICL and Xiaomi jointly launched an integrated warning system for MIUI and Xiaomi smart devices. They also pledged to make their technical developments freely available to international partners.

In addition, the public can access alerts via the ICL mobile app, available for free on the App Store and Google Play. As long as users are within the EEWS coverage area, estimated at 2 million square kilometers, they receive alerts directly on their devices.

== Achievement ==
In April 2011, the system successfully issued a warning for an aftershock of the 2008 Sichuan earthquake. In February 2013, the system provided a 15-second advance warning for a 4.9-magnitude earthquake in Zhaotong City, Yunnan, marking the first successful early warning of a destructive earthquake within mainland China.

As of May 2024, the system successfully issued early warnings for 80 destructive earthquakes. Notable instances include the 2013 Lushan Earthquake, the 2014 Ludian Earthquake, and the 2017 Jiuzhaigou Earthquake, and the 2019 Yibin Earthquake.
