= Cascadia Region Earthquake Science Center =

Coordinates: 44.0482°N 123.0691°W

- Formation: October 2023
- Headquarters: Eugene, OR, USA
- Director: Diego Melgar
- Website: cascadiaquakes.org

The Cascadia Region Earthquake Science Center (CRESCENT) is a research and educational collaboration between public and private universities, government agencies, and non-profits. The stated mission of the center is to (i) carry out basic and applied science research on earthquake hazards at the Cascadia Subduction Zone, (ii) promote access to careers in the geosciences, especially amongst minoritized individuals, and (iii) form partnerships between researchers and organizations in charge of response and planning for earthquake hazards.

== Overview ==
The center was established with US$15M in funding from the National Science Foundation as part of the Centers for Innovation and Community Engagement in Solid Earth Geohazards program which funds other important research centers such as the Statewide California Earthquake Center (SCEC).

== Partner institutions ==
CRESCENT directly funds researchers and educators from 14 institutions, they are:

- California State Polytechnic University, Humboldt
- Central Washington University
- EarthScope Consortium
- Oregon State University
- Portland State University
- Purdue University
- Smith College
- Stanford University
- University of California San Diego
- University of North Carolina Wilmington
- University of Oregon (headquarters)
- University of Washington
- Virginia Polytechnic Institute and State University
- Washington State University

In addition CRESCENT counts amongst its senior personnel many scientists from the U.S. Geological Survey.

== Headquarters ==
CRESCENT is part of the Department of Earth Sciences and is on the campus of the University of Oregon located in the city of Eugene.
