= 2022 Ferndale earthquake =

Earthquake in northern California

- UTC time: 2022-12-20 10:34:25
- ISC event: 625455849
- USGS-ANSS: ComCat
- Local date: December 20, 2022
- Local time: 02:34 PST (UTC−08:00)
- Magnitude: 6.4 M_{w}
- Depth: 17.9 km (11 mi)
- Epicenter: 40.525°N 124.423°W
- Areas affected: North Coast, California, United States
- Max. intensity: MMI VIII (Severe)
- Peak acceleration: 1.46 g
- Aftershocks: 271 above M_{w}1.0. Largest is M_{w}5.4.
- Casualties: 2 dead (indirect), 17 injured

On December 20, 2022, a magnitude 6.4 earthquake struck Ferndale, California in Humboldt County, United States at 10:34:25 UTC, or 2:34 a.m. PST.

== Tectonic setting ==
Much of Northern California lies close to the boundaries between three tectonic plates, the Pacific plate, the Gorda plate and the North American plate, which meet at the Mendocino triple junction. The Mendocino fracture zone marks the transform boundary between the Gorda and Pacific plates. This tectonic boundary has been the cause of many earthquakes in the region, including the megathrust 1700 Cascadia earthquake, and the 1992 Cape Mendocino earthquakes, the latter of which measured 7.2.

== Earthquake ==
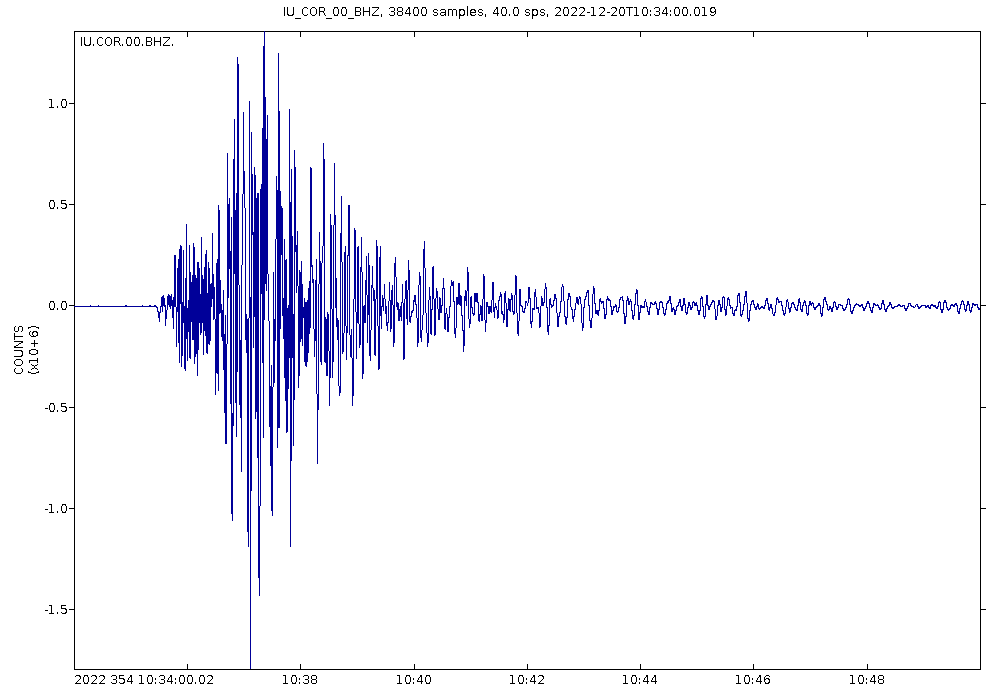
Seismogram captured by an instrument in Corvallis, Oregon

The earthquake measured 6.4 on the moment magnitude scale, and had a maximum Mercalli intensity of VIII (Severe). It came exactly a year after a 6.2 magnitude earthquake struck onshore in the Cape Mendocino area on December 20, 2021, causing only minor damage. It was the result of strike-slip faulting along either a southeast or southwest striking plane. The United States Geological Survey said the earthquake's depth, focal mechanism, and location suggest a likely source within the subducting Gorda plate. Despite being centered offshore, the fault that triggered the quake travelled onshore and ruptured northeasternwards.

=== Aftershocks ===
Following the mainshock, over 250 aftershocks above magnitude 1.0 occurred, distributed along a distance of 26 km (16 mi). The largest aftershock of the year measured 4.9 magnitude with a maximum intensity of V (Moderate). On January 1, 2023, a magnitude 5.4 aftershock struck, with a maximum intensity of VII. Broken windows, large cracks in buildings and power outages were reported in Humboldt County, California, due to this aftershock, and some houses were badly damaged after being shaken from their foundations. A magnitude 4.5 earthquake struck six miles west-southwest of Ferndale on March 21 and was attributed as an aftershock by the USGS.

== Impact ==
=== Casualties ===
Two people died due to "medical emergencies" involved with the earthquake, and seventeen others were injured. In both fatalities, ages 72 and 83, emergency workers were unable to attend to them because ambulances were responding to other areas. One of the deaths was related to a cardiac arrest.

=== Damage ===
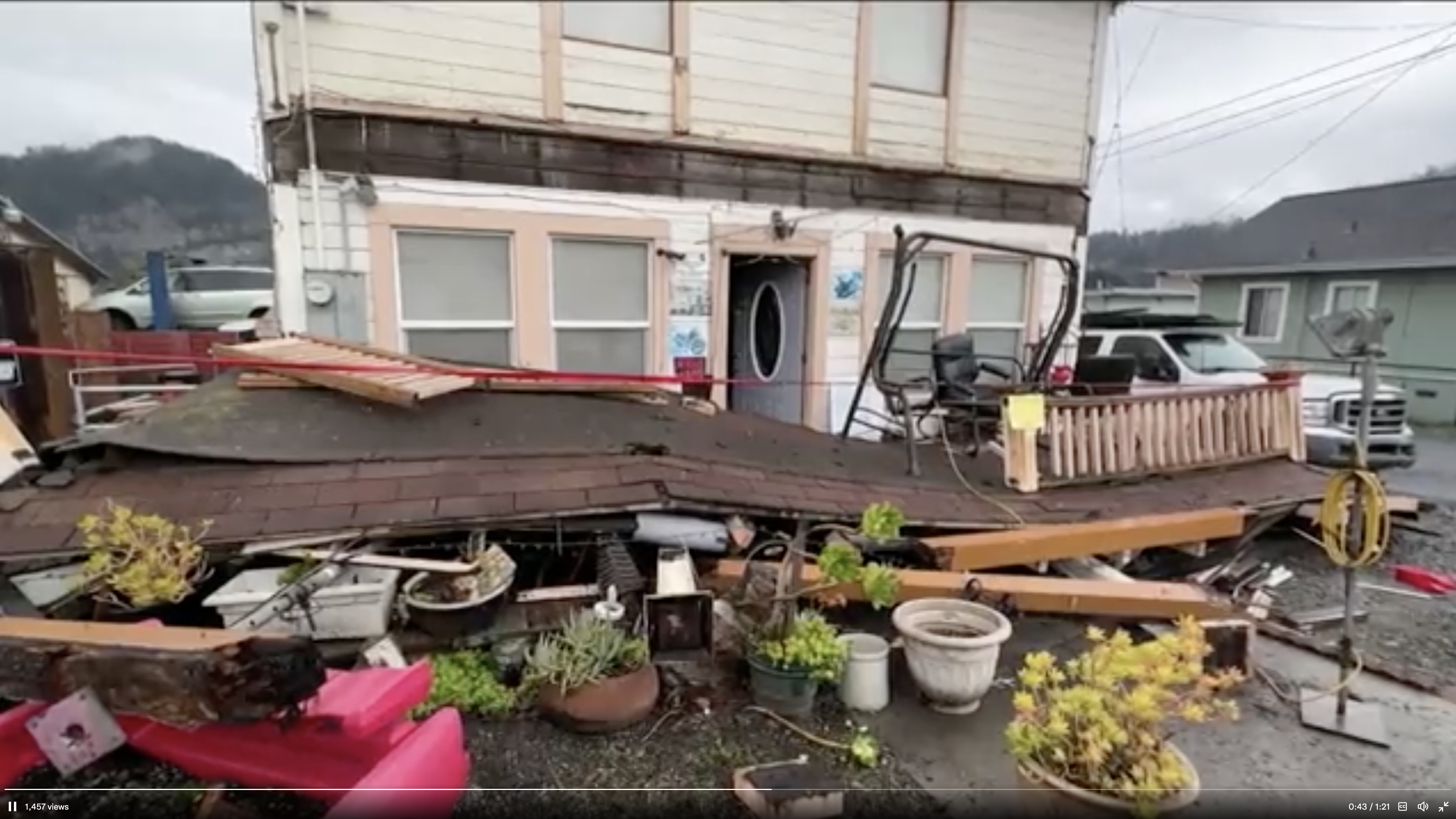
Damage to a house in Rio Dell, California caused by the 2022 Ferndale Earthquake. This house fell off its foundation blocks.

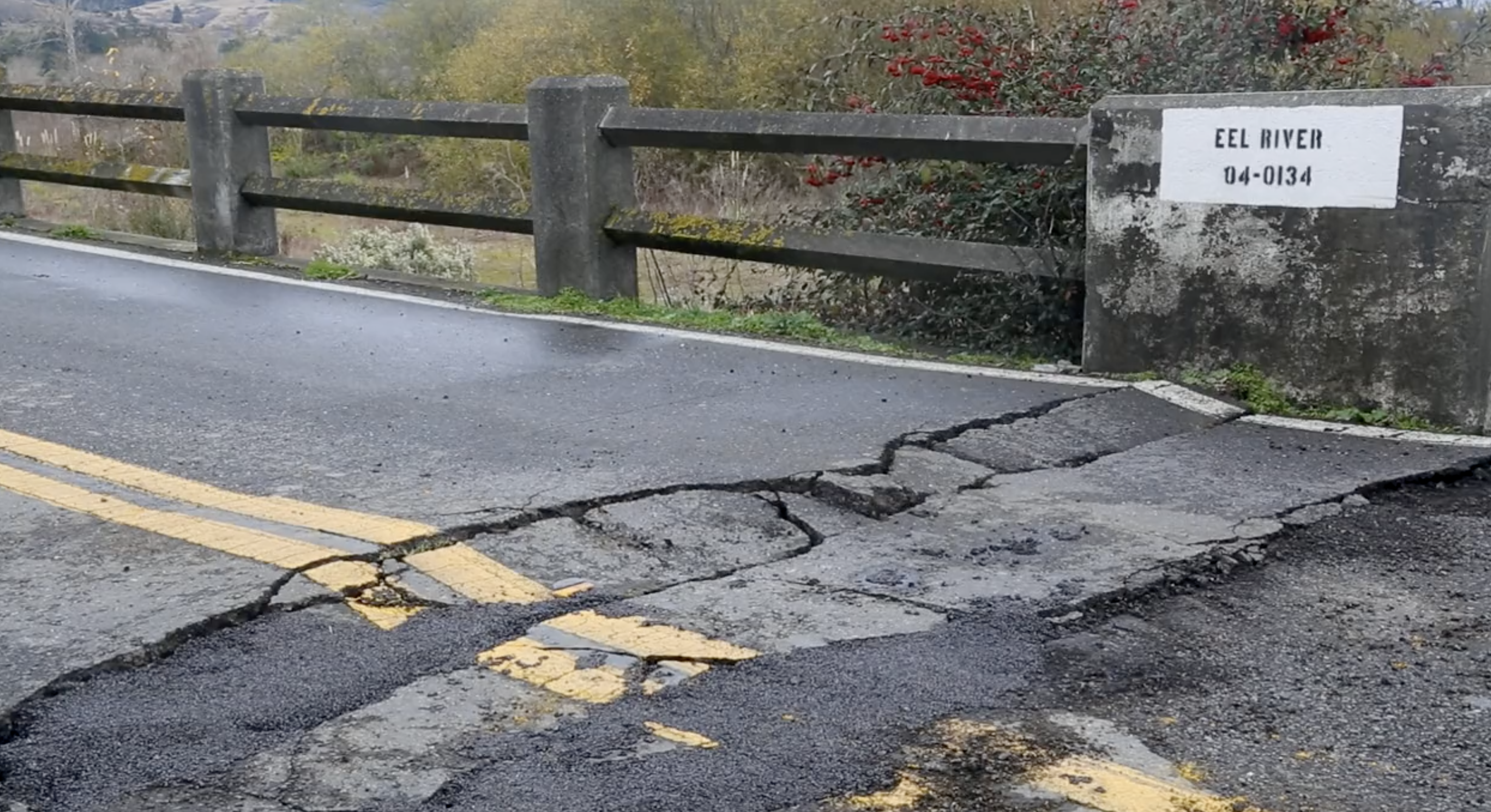
A damaged bridge ramp at Fernbridge near Ferndale.

Initial reports (via radio scanner traffic) indicated several houses were damaged, numerous gas leaks, and power outages in Rio Dell, California. Fifteen buildings collapsed or were severely damaged, including one in a fire caused by the tremors. About 100 people were displaced due to damaged homes. Glass windows in stores were shattered and homes knocked off their foundations. At Loleta, California, bricks toppled from the former Humboldt Creamery building. Some businesses in Fortuna, California and Ferndale sustained damage at storefronts and products fell. A total of up to 150 homes were damaged or destroyed due to the quake, most of them in Rio Dell.

Pacific Gas and Electric Company (PG&E) at first estimated that 50,000 people were without power in Humboldt County, a number later revised to 60,000. The California Independent System Operator (CAISO) declared a transmission emergency. Phones were alerted of the coming earthquake as far south as the San Francisco Bay Area. As of 4:25 am. PST, PG&E revised the total of customers without power to 71,170. Caltrans District 1 closed the Fernbridge over the Eel River on California State Route 211 due to four cracks which could cause the road itself to slide off. The California Office of Emergency Services (Cal OES) coordinated the responses of local governments (including tribal authorities), Cal Fire, Caltrans, the California Geological Survey, and the California Highway Patrol. Cal Poly Humboldt University was closed to all except essential personnel as of 7:16 am.

== Response ==
The earthquake activated ShakeAlert, USGS's earthquake early warning system for the West Coast. Three million people in northern California and southern Oregon received warnings on their smartphones. Sensors at Fortuna detected the earthquake at 02:34 and issued warnings as far as the California–Oregon border, south of San Jose, California, past Shasta County, California and to Medford, Oregon. The warning issue was the most widespread since the system went public in 2019. The National Oceanic and Atmospheric Administration (NOAA) did not issue a tsunami alert and no tsunami occurred. Many local NGOs and government entities responded, including Humboldt County Office of Emergency Services, Humboldt County Department of Health and Human Services, Pay It Forward Humboldt, and World Central Kitchen.

== See also ==
- 1980 Eureka earthquake
- 1992 Cape Mendocino earthquakes
- 2010 Eureka earthquake
- List of earthquakes in 2022
- List of earthquakes in California
