= ShakeAlert =

Earthquake early warning system for the United States

An animation detailing how ShakeAlert functions

ShakeAlert is an earthquake early warning system (EEW) in the United States, developed and operated by the United States Geological Survey (USGS) and its partners. As of 2021, the system issues alerts for the country's West Coast (specifically the states of California, Oregon and Washington). It is expected that the system will be expanded to other seismically active areas of the United States in the future. ShakeAlert is one of two EEW systems available in the United States, with Google's Android Earthquake Alerts System being the other.

Similar to other earthquake early warning systems, ShakeAlert does not predict earthquakes, but rather it attempts to quickly identify a seismic event and issue an alert before widespread shaking is felt. It does this by detecting an earthquake's fast moving (but weak) P waves, then computes the event's location and estimated magnitude, after which it issues the warning. Depending on a person's distance from the earthquake's epicenter, the alert may reach them before the earthquake's slower moving (but destructive) S waves do. These warnings can provide time for persons to take protective actions, such as "drop, cover, and hold," and for organizations to shut down transit systems, equipment, open fire station doors, and trigger specific protocols in hospitals and other sensitive work environments.

Research and development of the system began in 2006 and by the fall of 2018, the system was considered "sufficiently functional and tested" to enter phase 1 and begin issuing alerts for the West Coast states. While the warnings are generated by ShakeAlert, USGS does not send the alerts directly, instead relying on various private and public partners to distribute the messages through systems such as Wireless Emergency Alerts (WEA) and mobile apps. A statewide alert distribution system went online in California on October 17, 2019, in Oregon on March 11, 2021, and in Washington on May 4, 2021.

== Development ==
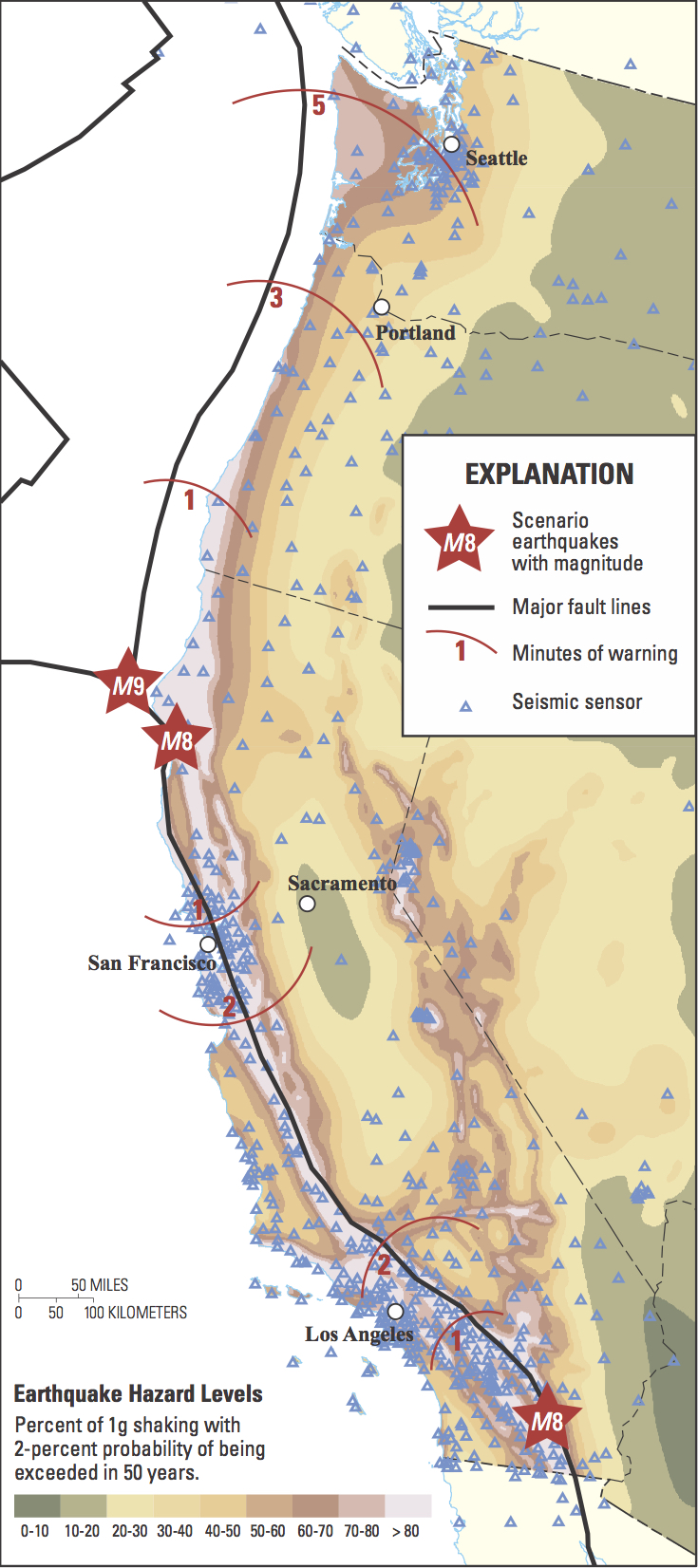
Map showing the amount of advance warning time that might be available from ShakeAlert for several plausible future earthquake scenarios

Initially the system has been developed to monitor and alert the West Coast of the United States, an area with significant seismic risk due to the San Andreas fault zone and the Cascadia subduction zone. The West Coast system was developed by a consortium of institutions including the United States Geological Survey, the California Governor's Office of Emergency Services (Cal OES), the California Geological Survey, California Institute of Technology, the Berkeley Seismological Laboratory at University of California, Berkeley, University of Washington, University of Oregon, and the Swiss Federal Institute of Technology in Zürich (ETHZ).

Research and development of the West Coast system (initially called CISN ShakeAlert) began in August 2006, becoming demonstrable in August 2009. In 2011, test users (mostly other seismologists) were able to access the system through the "UserDisplay" software. In January 2012, "beta" users were able to access the alerts in California. In February 2015, "beta" users were able to access the alerts in Oregon and Washington. In February 2016, the system moved from demonstrable to Production Prototype version 1.0 in California, providing alerts to "pilot" users. In April 2017, Production Prototype version 1.2 went live, expanding the prototype to Oregon and Washington "pilot" users. (Until this time, the Oregon/Washington system had been developed and operated separately from the California system.) On September 28, 2018, version 2.0 went live, allowing the "sufficiently functional and tested" system to begin Phase 1 of alerting California, Oregon and Washington.

Even though ShakeAlert could alert the public beginning in September 2018, the messages themselves could not be distributed until the various private and public distribution partners had completed mobile apps and made changes to various emergency alerting systems. The first publicly available alerting system was the ShakeAlertLA app, released on New Year's Eve 2018 (although it only alerted for shaking in the Los Angeles area). On October 17, 2019—the thirtieth anniversary of the Loma Prieta earthquake—Cal OES announced a statewide rollout of the alert distribution system in California. California refers to their system as the California Earthquake Early Warning System.

On March 11, 2021, a statewide alert distribution system was rolled out in Oregon. Rollout of the alert system for the West Coast was completed when a statewide alert distribution system went live in Washington on May 4, 2021.

=== Future plans ===
Of the 1,675 seismic stations needed for full implementation of the West Coast system, only 1,115 had been built or funded by April 2018 (67% of the total needed). The project continues to solicit property owners for permission to place new seismic stations.

Following the 2020 Salt Lake City earthquake, local media reported that Utah was the next state in line to get ShakeAlert.

=== Funding ===
In 2014, USGS estimated that the West Coast system would cost $38 million to complete and $16 million per year (equivalent to $50 million and $20 million in 2024, respectively) to operate over and above the investment that had already been made in earthquake monitoring. By 2018, the estimates for the system's cost had grown to $39.4 million for the initial build out and $28.6 million for yearly maintenance and operation (equivalent to $48.3 million and $35.1 million in 2024, respectively).

In December 2014, $5 million was added to the USGS budget for ShakeAlert development (equivalent to $10 million in 2024). This enabled USGS to purchase $1 million in seismic instrumentation and award $4 million in funding to the project partners to make the demonstration system more robust. In 2015, more than 30 Congress members signed a joint letter urging the President to add full funding for the system to his federal budget request. The Gordon and Betty Moore Foundation has invested more than $6 million in developing the system.

=== Neighboring systems ===
In August 2024, the Canadian Earthquake Early Warning system was launched by Natural Resources Canada (NRCan); this system was developed in cooperation with USGS and is based on the same software as ShakeAlert. While the two systems are distinct, USGS and NRCan share processing software, algorithms and real-time data.

== Detection methods ==
Full implementation of ShakeAlert on the West Coast system will require 1,675 seismic stations—1,115 in California and 560 in Oregon and Washington. These stations include sensors, such as seismometers, which are part of USGS's Advanced National Seismic System. During an earthquake, the stations send data to processing infrastructure in monitoring centers which, using various algorithms, are able to calculate the necessary information and generate alerts when needed.

Initially, ShakeAlert processing centers were capable of detecting earthquakes at an early stage because of three specific algorithms. The first algorithm was ElarmS. Also known as Earthquake Alarm Systems, these signals detect the P wave energy released during an earthquake. This energy, while given off quite early, does not usually cause damage. It was also the ElarmS that were responsible for roughly estimating the geographical location and size of the earthquake. Following these Elarms, empirical attenuation relations estimated how much the earth would shake in the specified region of the quake. The second algorithm was the $\tau_c$-$P_d$ OnSite algorithm. By using displacement amplitude $P_d$ and period $\tau_c$ of the first signs of shaking, the OnSite algorithm more accurately predicted the intensity and size of the earthquake than ElarmS did. The tradeoff of using these algorithms for the earliest detection possible meant having a less reliable approach than regional warning algorithms, however some argued that the added seconds to prepare are more important than reliability. Lastly, the Virtual Seismologist, known as the VS method, imitated the analysis of a human scientist in terms of capacity, but did so at a faster rate. A Bayesian framework was used with inputs of acceleration, velocity, and displacement. The last step required of all these algorithms is to come together in a decision module. This decision module broadcast the probability, size, and other characteristics of the earthquake.

As of 2018, all three of these algorithms have been replaced with two new algorithms – earthquake point-source integrated code (EPIC) and finite-fault detector (FinDer).

In 2024, Global Navigation Satellite System (GNSS) data was added to ShakeAlert to aid in the characterization of large magnitude earthquakes. The algorithm, GFAST (Geodetic First Approximation of Size and Timing), uses the peak ground displacement recorded at permanent GPS stations to determine magnitude. GFAST was developed by researchers from the Pacific Northwest Seismic Network at University of Washington. GFAST receives initial earthquake source information (origin time and epicenter) from EPIC or FinDer. Considerable logic was added to ShakeAlert to combine magnitude estimates from all three ShakeAlert algorithms to ensure robustness of solutions.

== Alert distribution ==
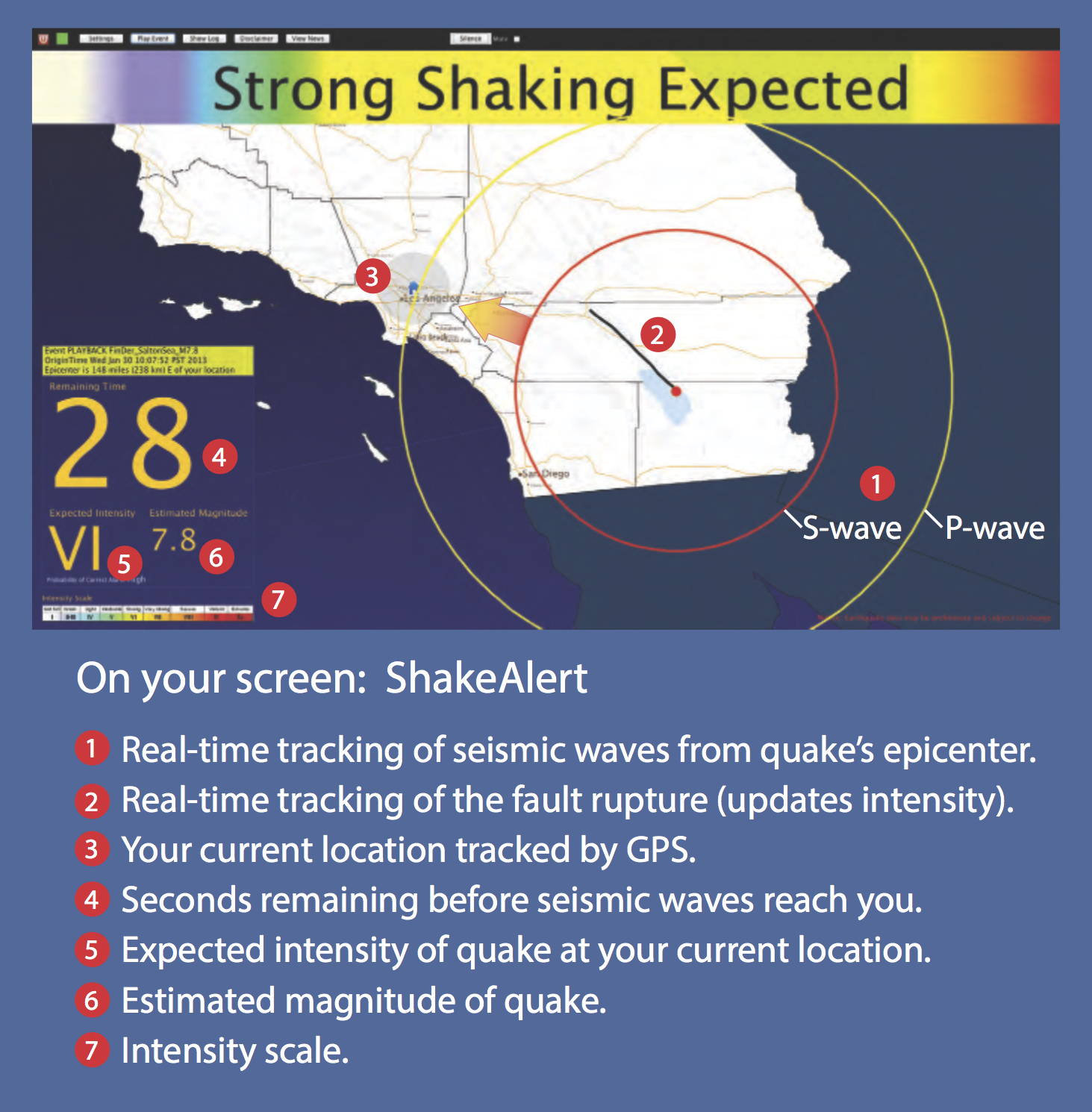
Example of warning issued by ShakeAlert

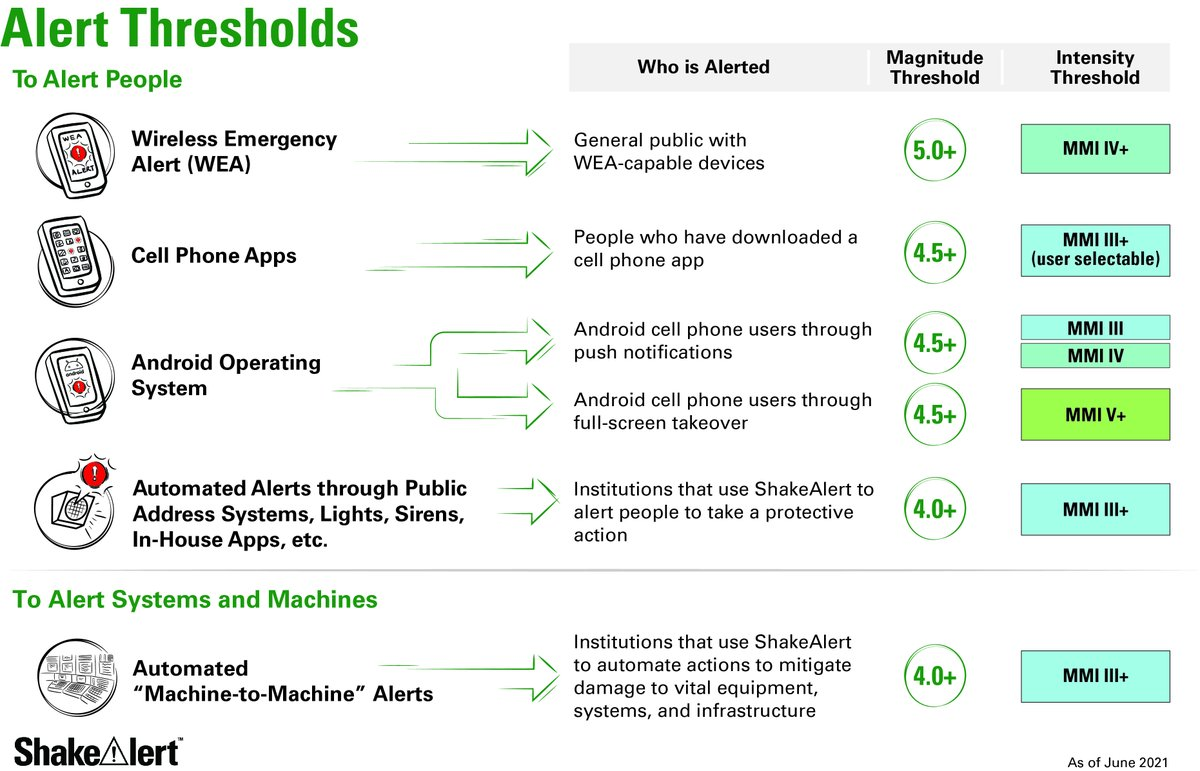
USGS graphic showing thresholds for public alerts from ShakeAlert

ShakeAlert warnings are sent to both institutional users and the general public through a variety of distribution methods; this includes messages via cell phones, television and radio. These alerts may give people time to take protective actions like "drop, cover and hold on", preventing injuries caused by falling debris. Various automated systems can listen for the alerts and stop public transport systems, prevent cars from entering bridges or tunnels, automatically shut down industrial systems and gas lines, and trigger specific protocols in hospitals and other sensitive work environments.

=== Institutional users ===
Bay Area Rapid Transit (BART) was an early user of ShakeAlert, initially connecting to the system in 2012 (when it was still in development). BART uses the system to automatically brake its trains when shaking threatens the San Francisco Bay Area.

By 2015, organizations enrolled in the beta test user program included: CalOES Warning Center, LA County Fire, LA City OEM, Amgen, LADWP, Metrolink, Caltrans and Disneyland. Additional institutional users were able to access alerts from the system, after ShakeAlert version 2.0 went live at the end of September 2018.

=== Cell phone alerts ===
==== Mobile apps ====
As of 2023, there are two mobile apps licensed to work with ShakeAlert: MyShake, developed by UC Berkeley, and SD Emergency, developed by San Diego County.

===== MyShake =====
MyShake was released in February 2016. Initially the app did not issue alerts, but instead used a phone's accelerometers to record shaking from an earthquake and send the data back to UC Berkeley for analysis, thereby creating a crowdsourced global seismic network. On October 17, 2019, a new version of the app was announced, which would also provide alerts from ShakeAlert to users in California, while allowing users outside the state to continue being part of the crowdsourced global network. The app began providing earthquake alerts in Oregon on March 11, 2021 and in Washington state on January 26, 2022.

MyShake only delivers alerts for earthquakes exceeding M_{W}4.5 and that will produce a shaking intensity greater than three.

===== SD Emergency =====
On August 26, 2021, officials from the County of San Diego and USGS announced that the "ShakeReadySD" feature had been added to the county's SD Emergency app, which would provide ShakeAlert warnings throughout California.

===== Former apps =====
====== QuakeAlertUSA ======
QuakeAlertUSA had been under development (and open to beta users), by Early Warning Labs, LLC, for several years before being publicly released on January 21, 2020 (at which time it only provided earthquake alerts in California). The app began providing earthquake alerts in Oregon on March 11, 2021. The QuakeAlertUSA app was decommission on November 6, 2023, so that the company could focus on its commercial earthquake response services.

QuakeAlertUSA delivered alerts for earthquakes exceeding M_{W}4.5 and that produced a shaking intensity greater than three. (Settings could be changed to require higher intensity earthquakes before alerting the user.)

====== ShakeAlertLA ======
ShakeAlertLA, was developed by the City of Los Angeles and AT&T. This app, which only warned of shaking in the Los Angeles County area, was made available to the general public at the end of 2018, but was retired after December 31, 2020.

==== Wireless Emergency Alerts ====
In the United States, the Wireless Emergency Alerts (WEA) system is used to disseminate emergency alerts (such as Amber alerts) to compatible mobile devices within a predefined area. ShakeAlert is capable of sending alerts to the Integrated Public Alert and Warning System (run by the Federal Emergency Management Agency), which then—through the WEA system—distributes messages to phone service providers who ultimately deliver the alert to their customers' devices.

WEA alerts are simple text messages, unlike the alerts sent by some mobile apps (as select apps include graphics with estimated intensity and arrival time of shaking). WEA alerts may also arrive more slowly than alerts from apps. Although unlike apps which must be downloaded, phones can receive WEA alerts automatically as long as emergency alerts are turned on in the device's settings.

ShakeAlert messages have been delivered via WEA in California since October 17, 2019, in Oregon since March 11, 2021, and in Washington since May 4, 2021.

WEA alerts are only sent for M_{W}5.0 or larger earthquakes.

==== Push notifications ====
On August 11, 2020, Google announced that it had partnered with USGS, allowing its Android operating system to distribute ShakeAlerts for California. The alerts are displayed using the operating system's built-in notification feature, which does not require an app or a message from the WEA system. The feature was also rolled out on March 11, 2021, in Oregon, and in Washington in the days following May 4, 2021.

As of 2021, Apple's iOS does not include a similar built-in notification system for ShakeAlert. Conversations between USGS and Apple have occurred, but no resolution has been reached. However, these devices can still receive earthquake alerts through WEA messaging, or, depending on the state, through apps.

== Past performance ==
=== Events during system development ===
==== 2014 California earthquakes ====
The system issued alerts for several significant southern California earthquakes in 2014 including a M_{W}4.4 event in Encino, a M_{W}4.2 event in Westwood, and a M_{W}5.1 event in La Habra.

It also issued a warning 5.4 seconds after the beginning of the M_{W}6.0 South Napa earthquake that hit the Napa region on August 24, 2014. Although it was initially reported that the system provided 10 seconds of warning before the S wave arrived in Berkeley, subsequent information showed that this was in error and the warning arrived 5 seconds before the S wave in Berkeley. This means the S waves had already arrived in Napa and Vallejo when the warning was issued. San Francisco received 8 seconds warning.

==== 2019 Ridgecrest earthquakes ====
ShakeAlert generated warnings for both the July 5 M_{W}6.4 and July 5 M_{W}7.1 Ridgecrest earthquakes.

Although not yet publicly available, beta users of the QuakeAlert mobile app received warnings on their phones. On average, the app's beta users received a warning of 45 seconds for both earthquakes. The only publicly available app (at the time), ShakeAlertLA, did not send an alert during the earthquakes. According to the City of Los Angeles, the system did not send alerts due to the estimated shaking in the Los Angeles area being below the activation threshold.

=== Events following general availability ===
==== 2019 Cholame earthquake ====
On December 17, 2019, the then recently released MyShake app sent its first alert for a M_{W}4.3 earthquake in the Cholame Valley. (Even though the earthquake was below the M_{W}4.5 threshold, a warning was still transmitted through the app, because preliminary readings measured the magnitude as 4.8.) No Wireless Emergency Alert was transmitted because the magnitude of the earthquake was below the 5.0 threshold.

==== 2021 Antelope Valley earthquake ====
The 2021 Antelope Valley earthquake occurred in a rural area near the California–Nevada border. Due to the remoteness of the area, there were few sensor stations near the earthquake and this resulted in the M_{W}6.0 earthquake incorrectly being split into "phantom quakes" by the system – a M_{W}4.8 near Lee Vining, M_{W}4.8 near Stockton, and M_{W}4.3 near Mammoth Lakes. Additionally, it took the system 25 seconds to declare an earthquake and issue an alert. While mobile apps received the alert, the warning was for an earthquake identified as M_{W}4.8 near Stockton (an incorrect magnitude and location). No Wireless Emergency Alert was transmitted because the system initially estimated the magnitude to be below the required M_{W}5.0 threshold (finalized reports showed the earthquake had actually exceeded the threshold for a WEA alert).

==== 2022 Ferndale earthquake ====
About 270,000 phones were alerted during the magnitude 6.4 December 2022 Ferndale earthquake.

== See also ==
- Earthquake Early Warning (Japan)
