= 2017 Mexico earthquake =

2017 Mexico earthquake may refer to:

- Magnitude 5.7 earthquake offshore 78 km west southwest of Higuera de Zaragoza on 29 March
- 2017 Chiapas earthquake, magnitude 8.1 earthquake on 7 September
- 2017 Puebla earthquake, magnitude 7.1 earthquake on 19 September
- Magnitude 6.1 earthquake 18 km south southeast of Matias Romero on 23 September
