= North Shore, California =

North Shore Mortmere/Mortmar
- Census-designated place
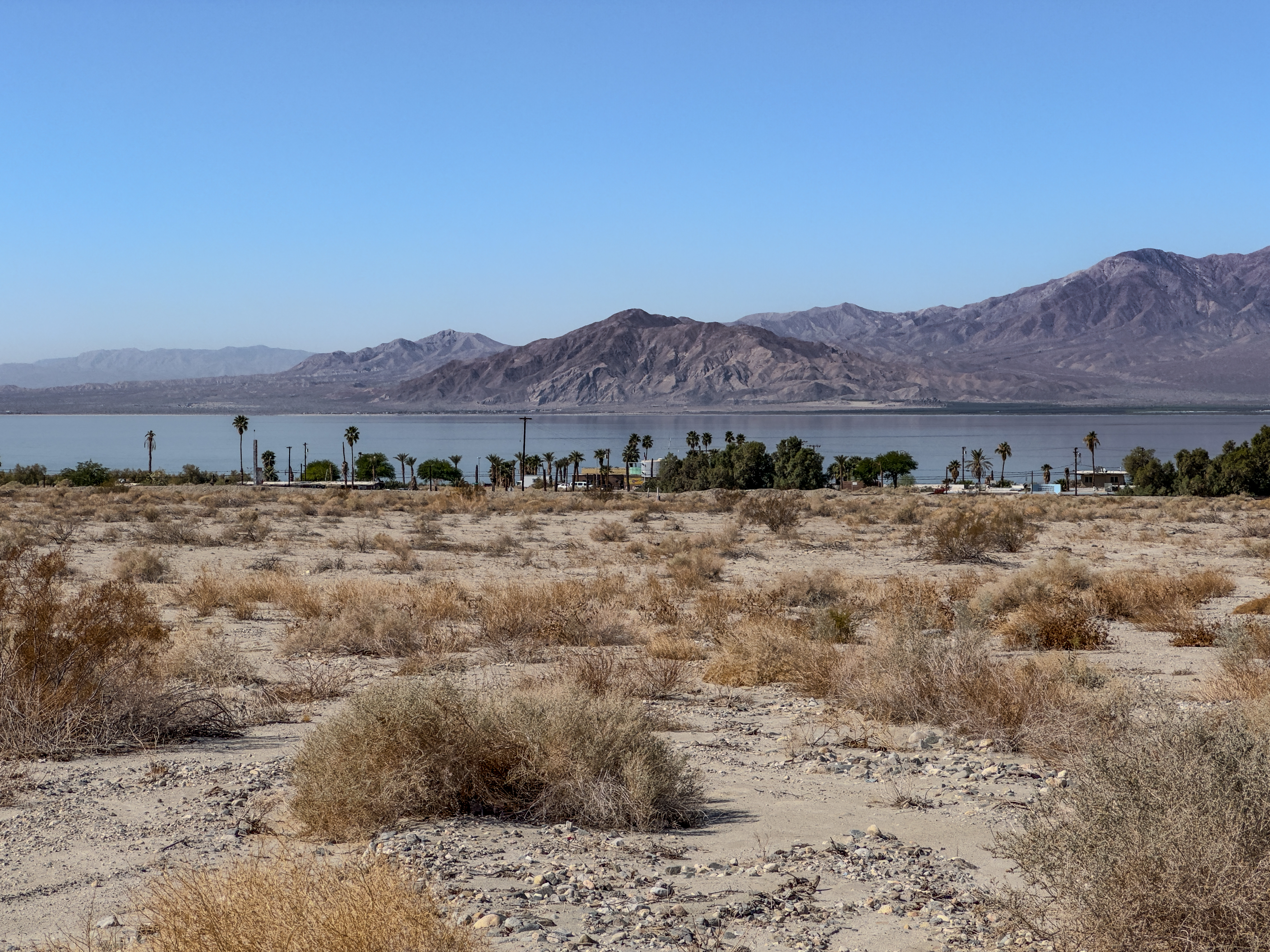
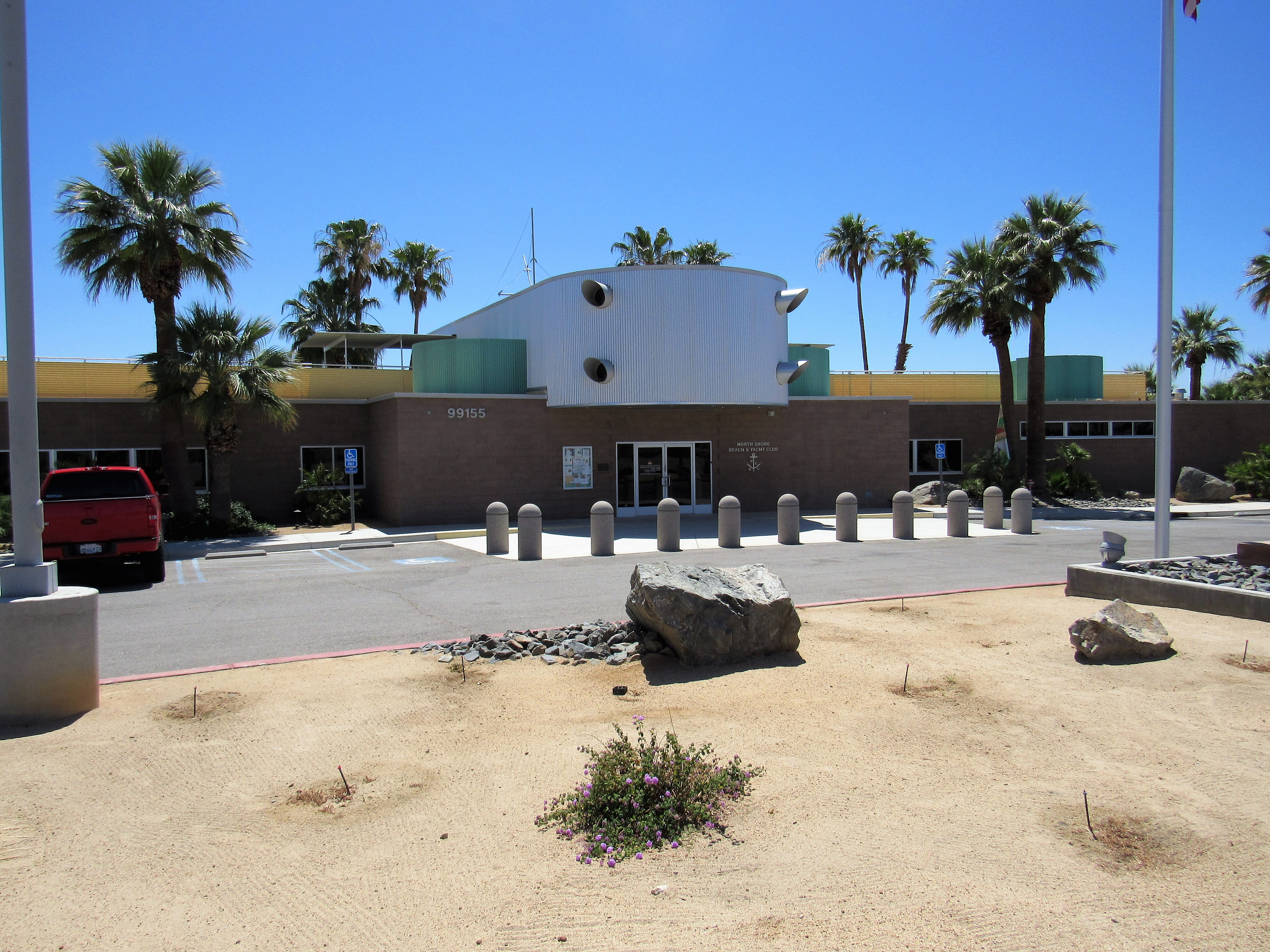
- Mortmar (North Shore), California with Salton Sea and Santa Rosa Mountains The North Shore Beach and Yacht Club in 2018

- Location in Riverside County and the state of California

- Location within the state of California North Shore (California) North Shore (the United States)
- Coordinates: 33°30′46″N 115°55′38″W
- Country: United States
- State: California
- County: Riverside
- Settled: 1930
- Incorporated CDP: 2010
- Named for: Northern End of the Salton Sea ("North Shore"); French: Mort[e] Mer ("Dead Sea")

Government
  - Type: Unincorporated County

Area
  - Total: 11.184 sq mi (28.966 km^{2})
  - Land: 11.178 sq mi (28.952 km^{2})
  - Water: 0.0054 sq mi (0.014 km^{2}) 0.05%
- Elevation: −69 ft (−21 m)

Population (2020)
  - Total: 3,585
  - Density: 320.7/sq mi (123.8/km^{2})
- Time zone: UTC-8 (Pacific (PST))
  - Summer (DST): UTC-7 (PDT)
- ZIP codes: 92254
- Area codes: 442/760
- GNIS feature ID: 2583097

North Shore is a census-designated place in southeastern Riverside County, so named because of its location along the northeast shore of the Salton Sea. It was once a popular vacation destination before increasing salinity and pollution of the Salton Sea shut the tourist trade down. North Shore is flanked to the north and south by the Salton Sea State Recreation Area. The population was 3,585 at the 2020 census, up from 3,477 at the 2010 census.

One building is particularly noteworthy. The North Shore Beach and Yacht Club, an Albert Frey design, opened in 1962 and was in active use until 1984; rising water levels destroyed the jetty in 1981, thereby making it impossible for boats to dock there. As recently as the early 2000s, it was possible to enter the lobby prior to its being boarded up, although stairs leading to the second floor had been removed prior to its abandonment. The Yacht Club has been restored under a $3.35 million grant and, since 2011, has been open to the public as a Community Center and historical landmark. The Salton Sea History Museum was relocated to Mecca, California in February 2012.

North Shore is accessible via State Route 111 at the Imperial County line. The wildlife refuge and campground is a short distance south of the town.

== History ==
=== Indigenous Cahuilla ===
For many eras, the Desert Cahuilla's native home was the Coachella Valley. The Cahuillas would use the nearby Dos Palmas Oasis as a water stop, which was also the eastern edge of their empire. The Cahuillas would travel from their village in Martinez to Dos Palmas Oasis via an ancient Native American trail known as the Cahuilla-Halchidhoma Trail. This prehistoric trail traversed the vicinity of the modern town of North Shore.

=== Spanish Explorers ===
In 1615, Juan de Iturbe, a Spanish explorer, set sail from Acapulco and headed north along the Sea of Cortez. He eventually reached the ancient Lake Cahuilla, which at the time was connected to the Sea of Cortez and was also its northernmost point. There, his ship became beached in the shallow waters, and his precious cargo of black pearls was lost forever in the vast desert. The legend of his lost treasure gained attention after the Great Flood of 1862, when locals reported seeing the outline of an ancient Spanish Galleon nearby in the Salton salt marshes.

Beginning in 1815, Spanish missions throughout Alta California collectively recruited soldiers to begin a long journey from the Pueblo of Los Angeles to collect salt from brine pools at the Salton sink known as the evaporating ancient Lake Cahuilla. The Spanish would collect salt near the Salton salt marshes (close to North Shore). This practice went on yearly until the 1830s; the salt journeys were referenced at the time as Jornadas de Sal.

=== Mexican Era / Romero Expedition ===
In December 1823, under imperial orders from The Emperor and Governor to re-open a route from Alta California to Sonora, Captain José Romero and Lieutenant José María Estudillo led the first recorded European expedition into the Coachella Valley. They used the Cahuilla-Halchidhoma Trail and were escorted by the Cahuilla to Dos Palmas, reaching it on December 30, 1823. They camped for four days before advancing eastward past the Cahuilla Lands. Romero's party returned to the Coachella Valley after their Indian guides, unfamiliar with the area, led them astray near Palen Lake.

In December 1825, after two years of waiting, José Romero successfully completed the journey to Tucson using the same Cahuilla-Halchidhoma trail. Alongside Romualdo Pacheco, Julián Valdéz, and Cococmaricopa Guides. They agreed the trail should only be used as a mail route and opted to use the Southern Emigrant Trail as a traveling route due to the typical hostile Yumas submitting to tentative peace talks with the Mexicans. In the following years, the Mexicans used the Cahuilla-Halchidhoma trail as a mail route from California to Sonora, although it was used sporadically. Dos Palmas near North Shore was an Important stop on the trail.

In January 1847, General José María Flores escaped to Sonora with around 36 Mexican soldiers after their defeat by the Americans in the Battle of La Mesa. Flores passed east of the San Gorgonio Pass, followed the Cahuilla–Halchidhoma trail to Dos Palmas, then tracked south across the Algodones Dunes, and finally reached the Yuma Crossing.

=== American Era / Bradshaw Trail ===
==== 1850s ====
In 1850, an American immigrant wagon train heading west from Iowa, led by Isaac W. Smith, entered California, the Union's newest state, via the Yuma Crossing. Smith retraced General Flores' route into San Bernardino.

In September 1857, as part of petitioning the John Butterfield mail route to pass from Yuma to San Bernardino, instead of Los Angeles or San Diego, a public petition was presented to the board of Supervisors asking that a road be surveyed from San Bernardino to the frontier of the Colorado Desert into Yuma. Dr. Isaac W. Smith from San Gorgonio Pass is elected to lead the survey retracing his route seven years ago. This expedition was named the "Smith Survey".

In August 1858, efforts to establish the mail route were abandoned after finding it impossible to develop water stops over the one hundred miles of wagon road between Dos Palmas and Yuma, through the arid Algodones Dunes. The Butterfield Overland Mail was not awarded to San Bernardino.

==== 1860s ====
In 1862, William D. Bradshaw connected La Paz Gold mines to Los Angeles using the prehistoric Indian Cahuilla-Halchidhoma Trail shown to him by Cahuillas and a Cocomaricopa. Bradshaw renamed it the Bradshaw Trail. A stagecoach rest stop on the trail known as "Lone Palm", "Palma Seca", or "Bitter Spring" was located between the Mecca Box Canyon and the Hidden Spring Canyon, in the vicinity of North Shore. This trail was used by many travelers traversing from Arizona to California. The railroad would eventually replace the stagecoach trail.

==== 1870s ====
On December 27, 1875, US President Ulysses S. Grant signed an executive order forming 13 Indian reservations in the Southern California Area. The Cahuillas had their land divided, and the Torres-Martinez reservation was established just west of the town of North Shore.

=== Southern Pacific Rail Road ===
==== 1880s ====
Southern Pacific constructed a railroad connecting Yuma to the Coachella Valley that traversed adjacent to North Shore. The railroad began construction in 1879 and was completed in 1883. During the construction, a handful of rail stations and small towns were established. One of the rail stations was Mortmere Station.

The New Liverpool Salt Company was established in 1883 at the rail station of Salton, just south of North Shore. It was a major producer of salt.

=== Salton Sea / Mortmere Station ===
Salton Sea creation 1905-1907

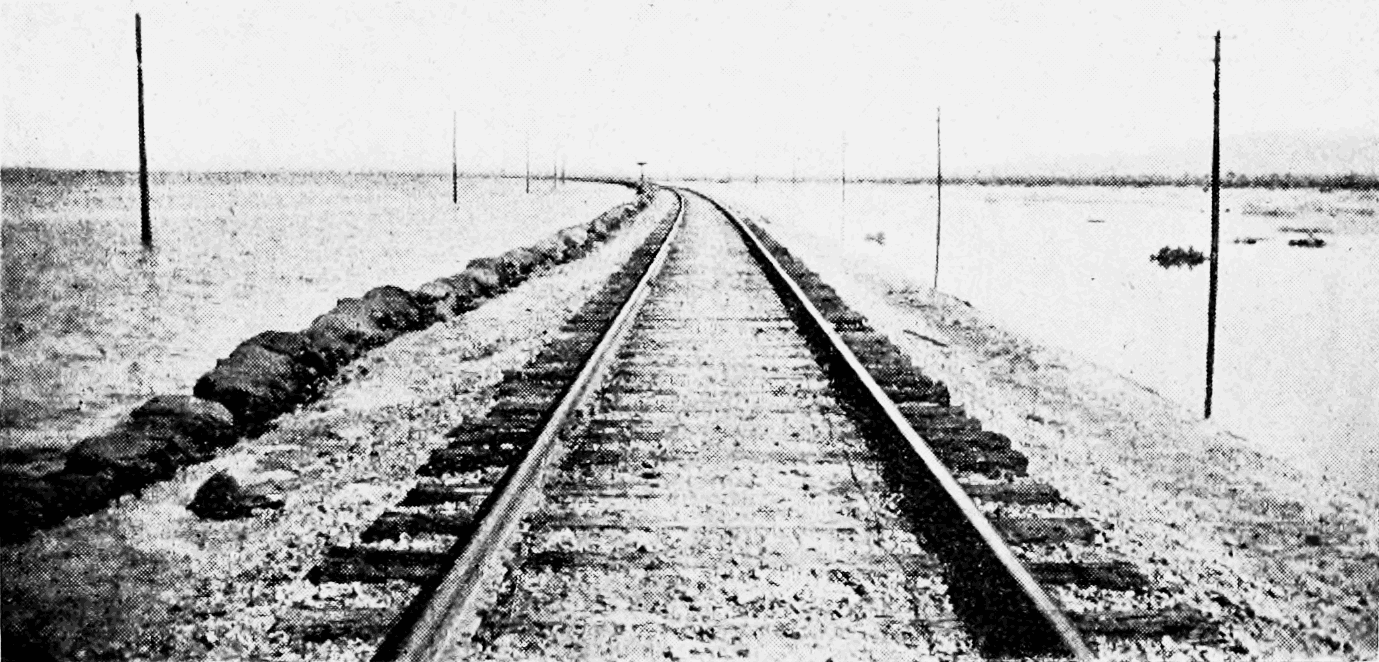
Sand bags placed near the railroad tracks attempting to mittigte the rising water in 1905

==== 1900s ====
From September 1905 to February 1907, the Colorado River overflowed into the Salton Sink, which had an ancient history of previous iterations of lakes. This time, the engineering disaster led to the creation of the modern Salton Sea. The disaster led to several SPRR train depots, rail stations and The New Liverpool Salt Company becoming permanently inundated. The railroad had to be moved north, and depots and stations rebuilt. The rebuilt station of Mortmere was renamed Mortmar and eventually was the foundation stone for the modern town of North Shore.

=== Gus Eiler's Date Palm Beach ===
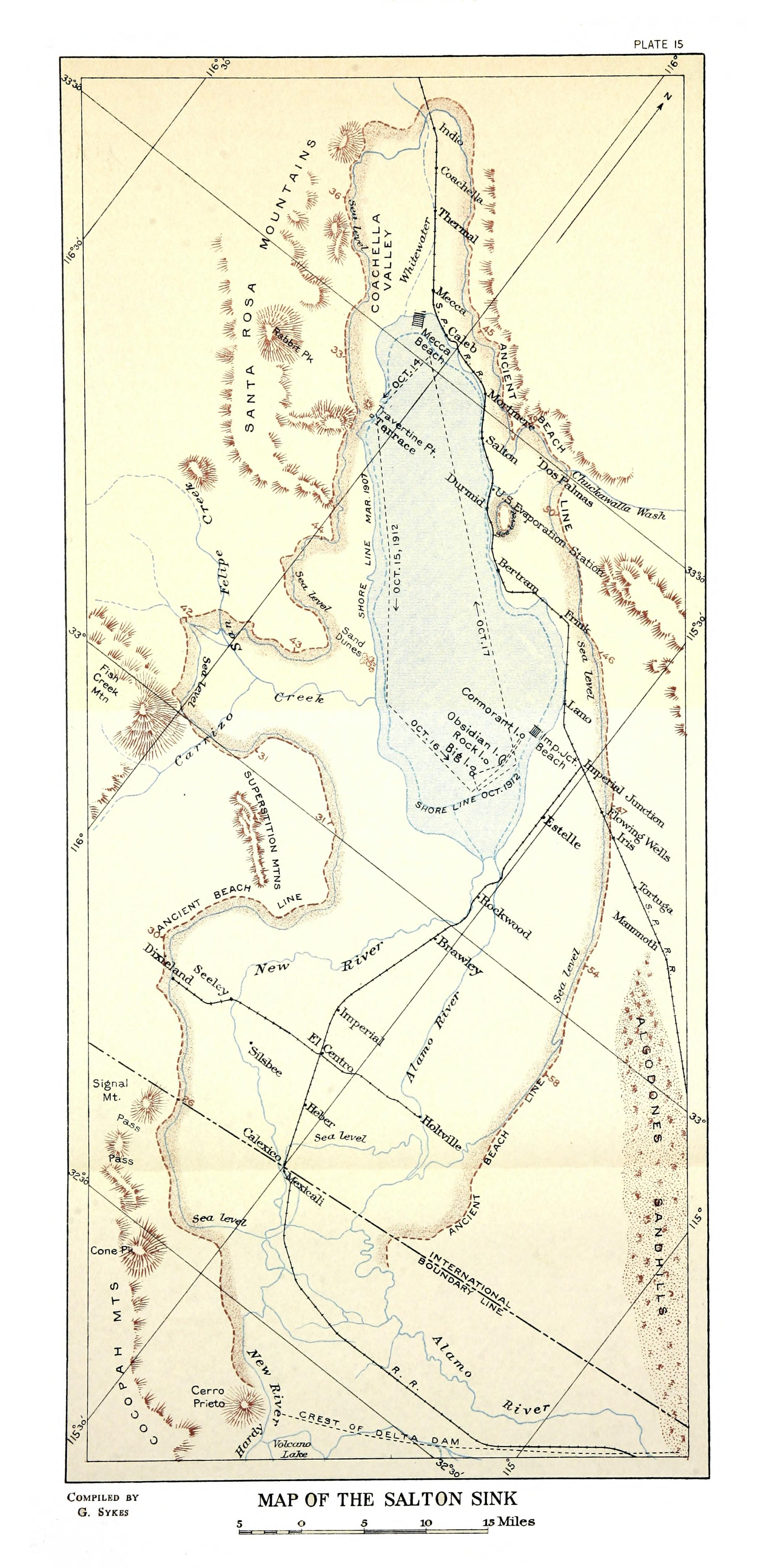
Mortmere Station is seen on a map as early as 1914.

==== 1920s ====
A handful of communities were established along the Salton Sea shoreline. Among the first, and certainly the first on the northern shore, was Date Palm Beach. In 1926, Gus Eilers, with the help of promoter John Goldthwaite, acquired land from the Southern Pacific Railroad near the Mortmere train station. Eilers planned for an exotic escape, using Egyptian motifs and Middle Eastern architecture.

==== 1930s ====
The first small building and pier were constructed in 1930. In 1932, Eilers moved two Olympic cottages from Los Angeles; they served as the first guest houses in Date Palm Beach. Soon, a new pier was erected. Eilers' wife and children joined him in 1934 to run the business.

The Coachella Canal began construction in the 1930s. Trenching was done north of the town of North Shore at the base of the Mecca Hills.

==== 1940s ====
In 1942, the Desert Training Center began operation. It was established by Major General George S. Patton, Jr. in response to a need to train American combat troops for battle in North Africa during World War II. It covered 18,000 square miles (47,000 km2). It was the largest military training ground ever to exist. Over one million men were trained at the eleven sub-camps scattered throughout the California Desert. Soldiers from the nearby Camp Young HQ or Thermal Army Air Field would come visit Date Palm Beach in the town of North Shore for recreational activities.

In 1946, the Eilers family sold Date Palm Beach to C. Roy Hunter, who renamed the place Desert Beach. The Desert Beach Yacht Club was established.

In 1949, the Coachella Canal was completed.

==== 1950s ====
By 1953, all improvements along the waterfront were a total loss. Litigation was brought against the Coachella Valley Water District and the Imperial Irrigation District, but Hunter died before the case was decided in 1960, in favor of Desert Beach's new owners.

The Salton Sea State Recreation Area was established in 1955 and is still in operation today.

Major development began in 1958 when developers Ray Ryan and Trav Rogers purchased a tract of land about a half mile north of Desert Beach to begin construction on "North Shore". Plots of land were sold.

=== Golden Decade ===
==== 1960s ====
In 1960, construction was started on the North Shore Beach & Yacht Club and the North Shore Motel, designed by Albert Frey. Both opened in 1962, and North Shore's marina was one of the largest in Southern California. For several years, North Shore was a popular place for celebrities like the Beach Boys, Jerry Lewis, Frank Sinatra, and others.

Developers Ray Ryan and Trav Rogers promoted the Salton Sea as "California's inland sea" and a desert paradise. Travel magazines, newspapers, and advertisements highlighted fishing tournaments, boating events, and celebrity appearances. This "glamorous getaway" image boosted visitor numbers far beyond what Yosemite, could attract at the time. Annual visitors to the Salton Sea reached over 1.5 million, compared to Yosemite's roughly 1 million in the 1960s.

=== Decline ===
State and scientific reports had warned in the 1960s that salinity would likely cause the sea to ecologically collapse by the 1980s or 1990s.

In 1968, California passed a statute (Assembly Bill 461) declaring that the primary use of the Salton Sea should be the collection of agricultural drainage, seepage, and other flow, a policy that had long-term environmental implications. Unfortunately, like other communities around the Salton Sea, fluctuating water levels, increasing salinity, and contamination of the waters plagued North Shore.

==== 1970s ====
The North Shore development initially included planned housing estates, though not all developments fully materialized, leaving undeveloped vacant residential lots.

On September 7, 1976, Hurricane Kathleen caused widespread destruction across the Coachella Valley. This event and further floods stalled progress in the Eastern Coachella Valley. Eventually, the tourism business was depleted.

==== 1980s ====
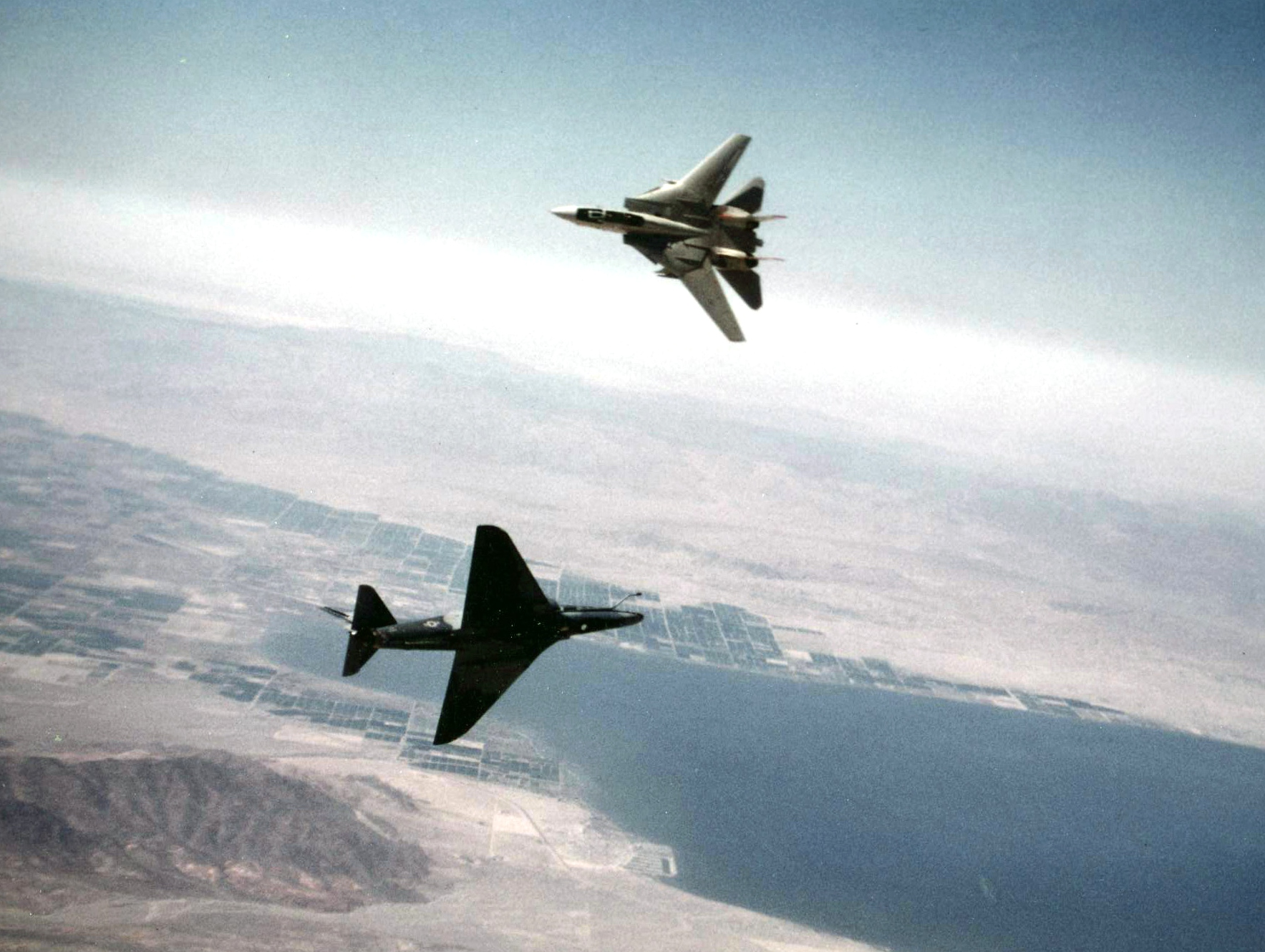
Aerial dog fight with northern end of the Salton Sea in the background in 1982

Another devastating flood in 1981 destroyed the jetty, rendering the marina unusable, and in 1984, the Yacht Club closed. Following the closure of the yacht club, which was the main attraction at North Shore Marina, the town came into disrepair and was neglected. A town that had begun as a resort for much of its existence had now begun a transition to agriculture, small ranches and residential properties.

==== 1990s ====
In the 1990s, scientists and agencies warned that as water inflows declined, the Salton Sea might shrink, exposing more of the dry lakebed, and that this could trigger dangerous dust storms for nearby communities. The 1990s for North Shore represent a lull period, not of growth but of decline and abandonment.

==== 2000s ====
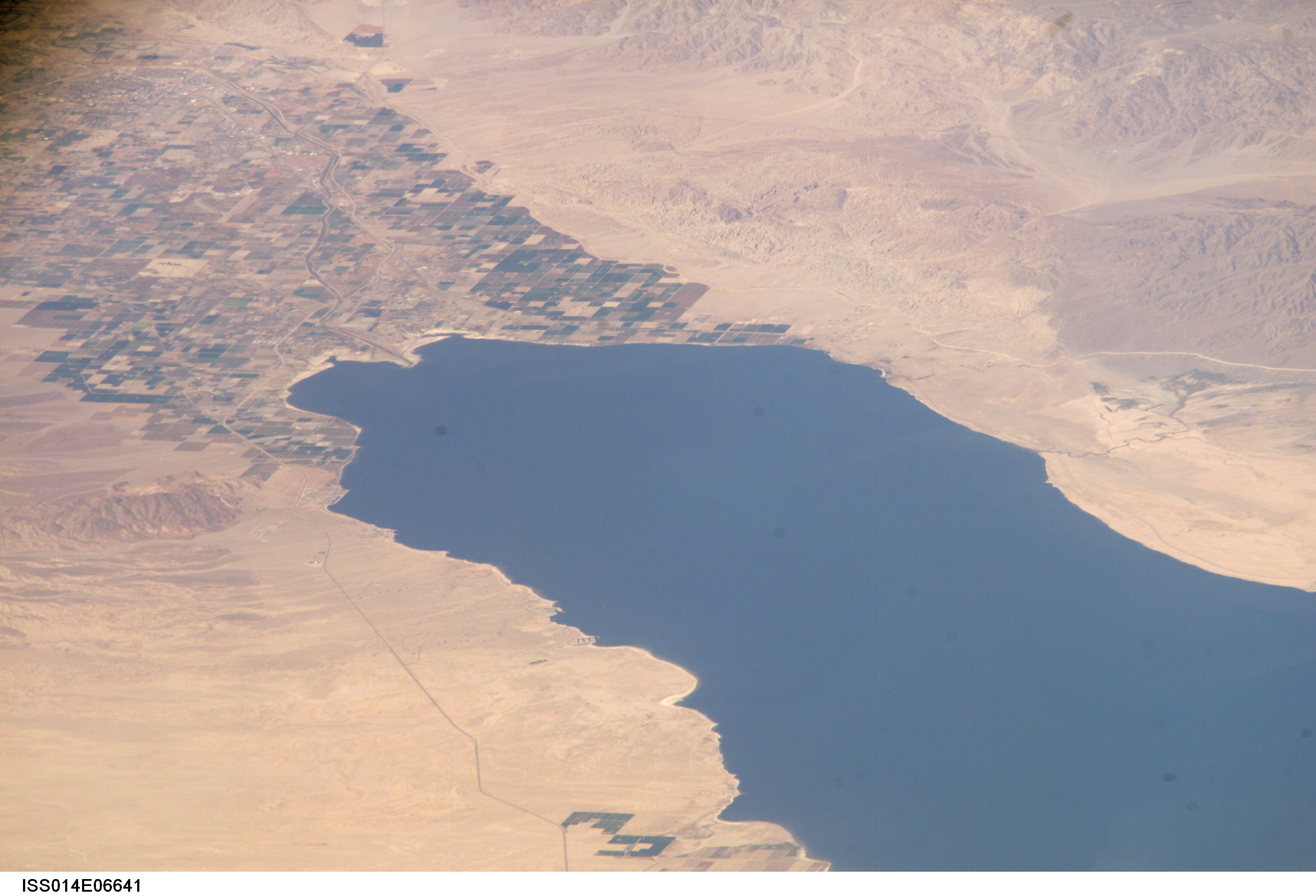
Photograph taken from ISS in Space of North Shore in October 2006

In October 2003, the Quantification Settlement Agreement (QSA) was signed, shifting Colorado River water from farming Imperial and Coachella Valleys to urban users in San Diego. This means less agricultural runoff flows to the Salton Sea. As lake inflows drop, more of the lake bed is exposed, especially along the north and east shores, and dust problems will spike.

In the early 2000s, the yacht club fell into disrepair. In November 2008, the North Shore Motel at the Salton Sea was demolished. Officials debated demolishing the heavily vandalized former yacht club adjacent to the demolished hotel. In July 2009, the County of Riverside secured over $3 million in funding to restore the deteriorating yacht club. The restored North Shore Beach and Yacht Club re-opened in 2010.

==== 2010s ====
In January 2010, construction was well underway on the former Yacht Club, which was being renovated into a museum & community center. On May 1, 2010, it opened its doors to the public as the Salton Sea History Museum & Community Center.

During the 2010 Census, North Shore was designated a Census-designated place.

On June 3, 2011, the Salton Sea History Museum vacated due to leasing & funding issues. The community center remains open as of 2025.

In 2017, the Salton Sea's shoreline began retreating more quickly, exposing additional lake bed around communities like North Shore. Air quality monitors and health studies document rising levels of PM10 and other dust in the Eastern Coachella Valley, with children in Mecca, North Shore, and nearby areas showing high asthma rates. Reports by state and university researchers highlight that the newly exposed lakebed is a major dust source, carrying salts and farm pollutants from decades of runoff.

On October 12, 2018, the North Shore Community Park opened to the public. It was the first Recreational Park in the community's history.

In Late Fall 2018, the ColGreen North Shore Solar Power Plant, a nearly 100-megawatt solar farm, began operation on roughly 480 acres, just west of North Shore. On February 15, 2019, the Solar Power Plant hosted a ribbon-cutting ceremony.

=== Redevelopment ===
On October 19, 2023, Congressman Eduardo Garcia introduced the North Lake Pilot Demonstration Project, a developmental project aimed at revitalizing recreation and tourism. It was planned as a habitat and dust-control project, designed to re-flood or cover the exposed lake bed with water, wetlands, or vegetation to keep dust down. The first phase of the project is scheduled to begin in 2026.

On January 14, 2025, the Chuckwalla National Monument was established in an effort to respark and revive tourism.

On August 11, 2025, North Shore Elementary School opened its doors, establishing the first school in the town's history.

== Geography ==
According to the United States Census Bureau, the CDP covers an area of 11.2 square miles (29.0 km^{2}), of which 99.95% is land.

== Demographics ==
Historical population
| Census | Pop. | Note | %± |
|---|---|---|---|
| 2010 | 3,477 | | — |
| 2020 | 3,585 | | 3.1% |
U.S. Decennial Census; 1860–1870 1880-1890; 1900 1910 1920; 1930 1940 1950; 1960 1970 1980; 1990 2000 2010

North Shore first appeared as a census designated place in the 2000 U.S. census.

=== Racial and ethnic composition ===
North Shore CDP, California – Racial and ethnic composition Note: the US Census treats Hispanic/Latino as an ethnic category. This table excludes Latinos from the racial categories and assigns them to a separate category. Hispanics/Latinos may be of any race.
| Race / Ethnicity (NH = Non-Hispanic) | Pop 2010 | Pop 2020 | % 2010 | % 2020 |
|---|---|---|---|---|
| White alone (NH) | 125 | 88 | 3.60% | 2.45% |
| Black or African American alone (NH) | 16 | 2 | 0.46% | 0.06% |
| Native American or Alaska Native alone (NH) | 4 | 7 | 0.12% | 0.20% |
| Asian alone (NH) | 15 | 5 | 0.43% | 0.14% |
| Native Hawaiian or Pacific Islander alone (NH) | 0 | 0 | 0.00% | 0.00% |
| Other race alone (NH) | 1 | 6 | 0.03% | 0.17% |
| Mixed race or Multiracial (NH) | 3 | 5 | 0.09% | 0.14% |
| Hispanic or Latino (any race) | 3,313 | 3,472 | 95.28% | 96.85% |
| Total | 3,477 | 3,585 | 100.00% | 100.00% |

=== 2020 census ===
As of the 2020 census, North Shore had a population of 3,585, with a population density of 320.7 inhabitants per square mile (123.8/km^{2}). The median age was 28.4 years. For every 100 females, there were 103.0 males, and for every 100 females age 18 and over, there were 99.9 males age 18 and over.

The age distribution was 32.4% under the age of 18, 12.2% aged 18 to 24, 26.5% aged 25 to 44, 21.2% aged 45 to 64, and 7.7% aged 65 or older.

0.0% of residents lived in urban areas, while 100.0% lived in rural areas.

Racial composition as of the 2020 census
| Race | Number | Percent |
|---|---|---|
| White | 571 | 15.9% |
| Black or African American | 11 | 0.3% |
| American Indian and Alaska Native | 116 | 3.2% |
| Asian | 5 | 0.1% |
| Native Hawaiian and Other Pacific Islander | 1 | 0.0% |
| Some other race | 2,179 | 60.8% |
| Two or more races | 702 | 19.6% |

The whole population lived in households. There were 832 households, out of which 56.1% had children under the age of 18 living in them. Of all households, 65.5% were married-couple households, 5.5% were cohabiting couple households, 11.8% had a male householder with no spouse or partner present, and 17.2% had a female householder with no spouse or partner present. In addition, 8.5% of households were one person, and 3.6% were one person aged 65 or older. The average household size was 4.31. There were 741 families (89.1% of all households).

There were 882 housing units at an average density of 78.9 units per square mile (30.5 units/km^{2}). Of these units, 832 (94.3%) were occupied and 5.7% were vacant. Of occupied units, 74.8% were owner-occupied and 25.2% were occupied by renters. The homeowner vacancy rate was 0.2%, and the rental vacancy rate was 5.4%.

== See also ==
- Salton Sea State Recreation Area
- Sonny Bono Salton Sea National Wildlife Refuge
