= KFUT =

KFUT may refer to:

- KFUT (FM), a radio station (89.5 FM) licensed in 2025 to serve Twain Harte, California, United States
- KHCV (FM), a radio station (104.3 FM) licensed to serve Mecca, California, United States, which held the call sign KFUT from 2014 to 2016
- KGAY (AM), a radio station (1270 AM) licensed to serve Thousand Palms, California, which held the call sign KFUT from 2007 to 2013
