= KHCV =

KHCV may refer to:

- KHCV (FM), a radio station (104.3 FM) licensed to serve Mecca, California, United States
- KWPS-FM, a radio station (99.7 FM) licensed to serve Caddo Valley, Arkansas, United States, which held the call sign KHCV in 2013
- KFFV, a television station (channel 44) licensed to serve Seattle, Washington, United States, which held the call sign KHCV from 1999 to 2009
