= Bradshaw Trail =

Historic trail in Southern California, US

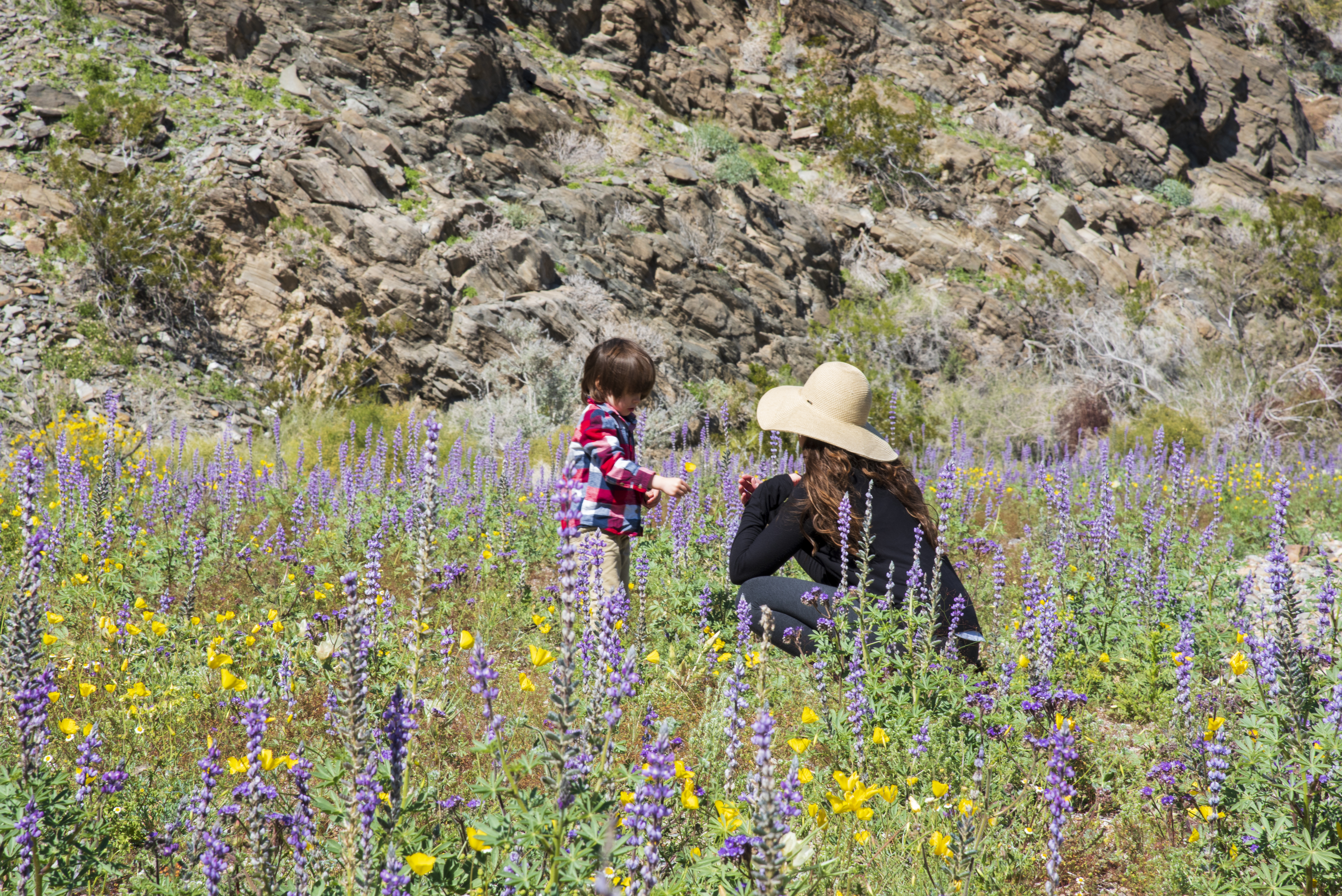
- Mother and child on Bradshaw Trail, 2019
- Length: 70 mi (113 km); Historically 180 miles (289.68 km)
- Location: Colorado Desert, Southern California
- Established: Cahuilla & Halchidhoma (pce);William Bradshaw (June 1862)
- Designation: National Backcountry Byway
- Trailheads: Currently: Dos Palmas Oasis to Palo Verde Valley; Historically: San Bernardino, CA to La Paz, AZ
- Use: Hiking; Off roading Horseback riding Camping; Historically: Native American trade Route (c. pce - 1890's); Mexican Mail Route (1821-1847); Stagecoach & Gold Prospector road (1862-1877)
- Elevation change: 2,420 ft (740 m)
- Highest point: Chuckwalla Mountain Pass, 2,500 ft (762 m)
- Lowest point: Dos Palmas Oasis, 80 ft (24 m)
- Difficulty: Medium to strenuous
- Season: early Autumn to late Spring for thru-hikers; year-round for other users
- Sights: Chuckwalla National Monument,Dos Palmas Oasis
- Hazards: Heat wave Dehydration; Flash flood Cacti; Venomous Snakes & Arachnids; Hypothermia; Mountain lions (rare); Diarrhea from water
- Surface: soft sand / natural dirt
- Website: BLM Bradshaw Trail

Historic Bradshaw Trail
Click the fullscreen button in the top right for more details
Stops on the Bradshaw Trail

The Bradshaw Trail is a historic overland stage route and ancient Indian trail in the Colorado Desert of Southern California. In 1862, William Bradshaw established the first road across Riverside County to the Colorado River as an overland stage route. Starting in San Bernardino, the trail was heavily traveled from 1862 to 1877, transporting miners and other passengers to the gold fields at La Paz, Arizona. An approximately 70-mile recreational trail (110 km) along the route is maintained by the Riverside County Transportation Department.

This route across the Colorado Desert was part of an Indigenous trade network. It was used by Native peoples, including the Cahuilla, Halchidhoma, Maricopa, and others, who knew the locations of springs and water holes and traveled between what's now Southern California and the Colorado River region. Historians named the ancient trade route the Cahuilla-Halchidhoma Trail, the Mexicans called the route into the Colorado Desert the Cocomaricopa Trail, Californians pre 1860's called the Route the Old Salt Road.

Historically The route ran from San Bernardino, California, through the San Gorgonio Pass and Coachella Valley, past the Salton Sink (now filled by the Salton Sea), through the Chuckwalla Mountains, and east to the Colorado River where Bradshaw's Ferry was available to transport travelers across the river to the gold fields upstream in La Paz, Arizona. Once in La Paz, additional eastern roads provided access to the mining districts of the central Arizona Territory, near Wickenburg and Prescott.

The current trail is a graded dirt road, that traverses southeastern Riverside County, and a minimal part of Imperial County, Western trailhead beginning roughly 3 miles (4.8 km) east of Dos Palmas Oasis and Eastern terminus about 4 miles (6.4 km) north-west of Palo Verde, CA for a total of 70 miles (110 km).

== History ==
=== Spanish Explorers ===
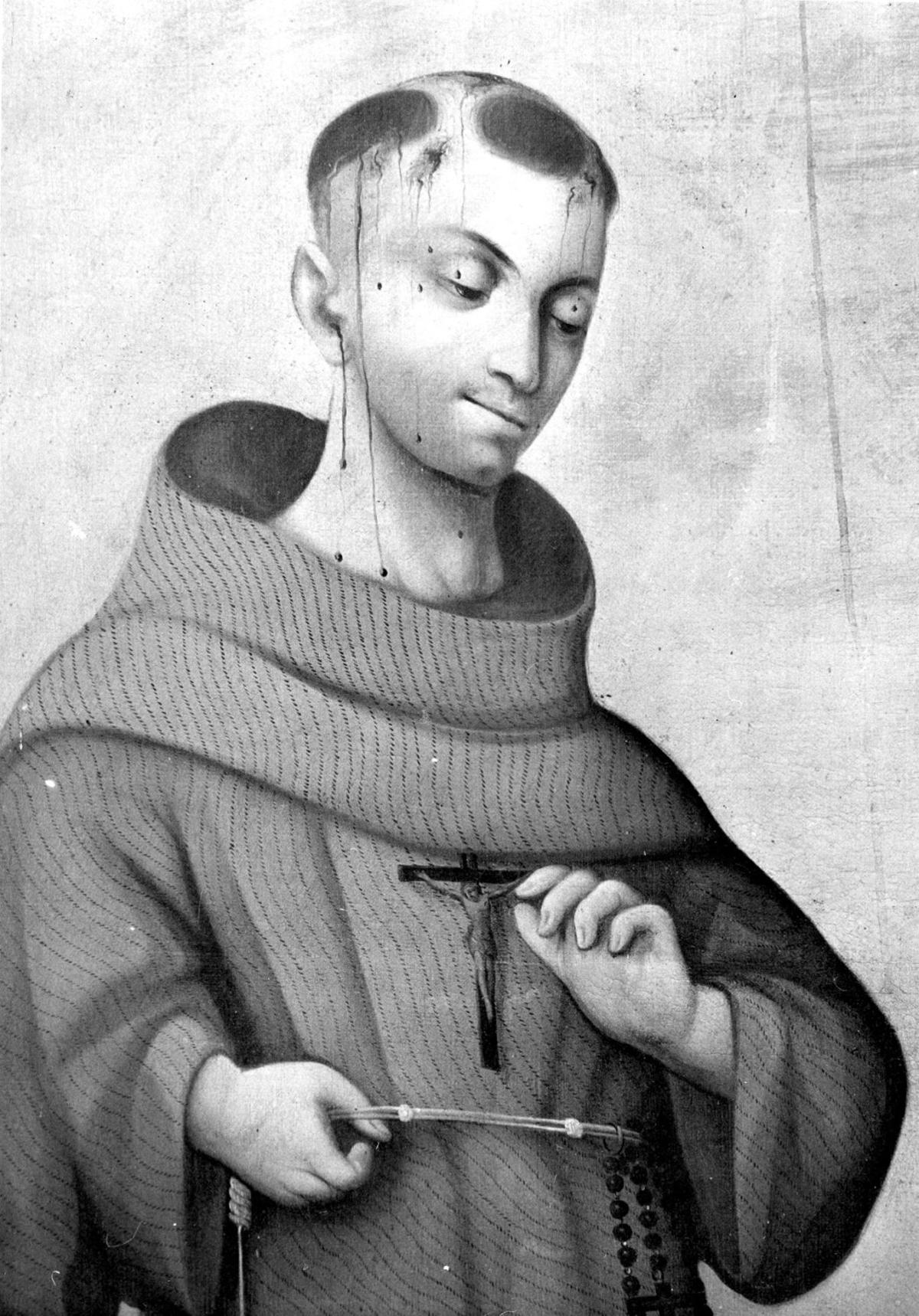
Friar Garcés documented the Chuckwalla Springs (a stop on the trail) which he named Pools of Tesquien in 1776

In February 1776, Friar Francisco Garcés on an expedition from Tucson traveling north on the Colorado River encountered Halchidhoma natives, who guided him west on the Halchidhoma trail. Eventually, Garcés reached the Pools of Tesquien, today known as Chuckwalla Springs, on February 28. The Halchidhoma informed Garcés that the trail they traversed connected them to the Cahuilla's lands and their trail reached as far as the Natives along the Santa Ana River in San Bernardino Valley. They failed to provide Garcés with guides, and he had better luck further North on the Colorado River with the Mojave natives. If the Halchidhoma had provided guides, they would've kept following the trail west to Dos Palmas Oasis, past San Gorgonio Pass, and reached his destination, the San Gabriel Mission near Los Angeles. Instead, Garcés traveled around the Mojave Desert, reaching his destination through the Cajon Pass/Mojave Trail.

Spanish influence on the trail was documented as early as 1809. Spanish missionaries would conduct Baptisms of San Gorgonio Pass Cahuillas at the San Gabriel Mission. Starting in 1815, missionaries would conduct yearly journeys to collect Salt several miles east of the San Gorgonio Pass in the Salton Sink (Northern Shore of Salton Sea), territory reached only on the Cahuilla's trail. Beginning in the very early 1820's, Mexican Vaqueros grazing cattle from Rancho San Gorgonio would travel east of the San Gorgonio pass on the trail and into Sec-he, a Cahuilla village with a hot spring. The Spanish named the village Agua Caliente, today known as Palm Springs. The yearly salt journeys lasted until the 1830s; the Californians named it the Old Salt Road.

=== Maricopas reach San Gabriel ===
In 1821, José Cocomaricopa, a Maricopa leader, traveled on foot from the Gila-Colorado River region to San Gabriel Mission with a small group of companions. When they arrived, he handed the missionaries an official letter from the commander of the Presidio of Tucson, whom he met in February. He told the missionaries that they had covered the distance from the Colorado River to San Gabriel in six days, following an existing Native trail across the desert. They said they came to trade, showing that Indigenous traders were already using this overland route between the Colorado River area and coastal California before Mexican and later U.S. expeditions formally opened it.

José the native, was escorted from San Gabriel Mission to San Diego Presidio to speak to José María Estudillo, a Spanish lieutenant. The Maricopas were instructed to leave Alta California and return to their lands on the Gila River. Estudillo wrote down the route the Maricopas took back to the Colorado River. The Spanish were perplexed about how the natives appeared at San Gabriel first and not San Diego, since the Spanish would use a more southern route to cross the Colorado Desert known as the de Anza trail. This established trail heading east towards the Colorado River had closed in July 1781, following the Yuma Crossing massacre in which hostile Yumas killed Friar Garcés and more than fifty other Spanish settlers.

For the Spanish and later Mexican governments, it was imperative the land connection be reestablished from coastal California settlements to the eastern Province of Sonora, specifically Tucson. If José Cocomaricopa reached San Gabriel carrying a letter from Tucson, through hostile Yuman lands, surely there was an undiscovered route to Sonora from California.

=== Romero Expeditions ===
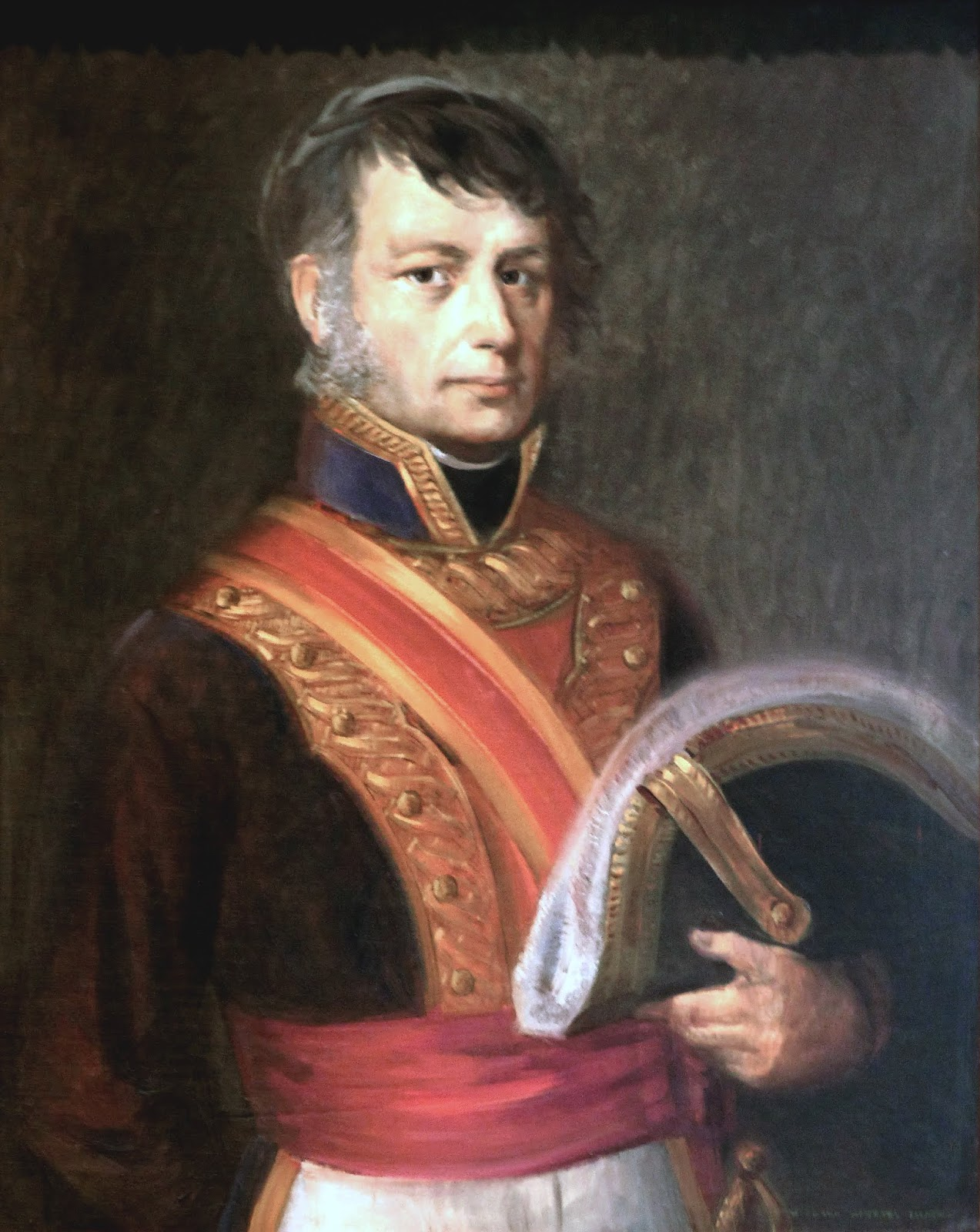
Lieutenant José María Estudillo documented the first non-native expedition on the trail.

In December 1823, under orders from California Governor Luis Antonio Argüello, Lieutenant José María Estudillo & Captain José Romero led an expeditionary military force from Mission San Gabriel, to find an overland route from San Gabriel to Tucson, after de Anza's alternate southern trail closed, in 1781 after a massacre of Spanish settlers perpetrated by Yuma natives.

Retracing José Cocomaricopa's steps, they tracked east through the San Gorgonio Pass into the Colorado Desert and were escorted by Cahuillas following the Cahuilla–Halchidhoma trail to Dos Palmas Oasis. From there, they attempted to continue east toward the Colorado River, but their two Indian guides, unfamiliar with the trail's eastern section in the Chuckwalla Mountain range, led them astray north of the trail near Palen Lake, forcing the party to turn back without reaching Tucson on that attempt. Two years later, in December 1825, Romero completed the expedition. Romero effectively re-established the Sonora to Alta California land connection and set the stage for the route's use as a mail and courier path between the two Mexican provinces.

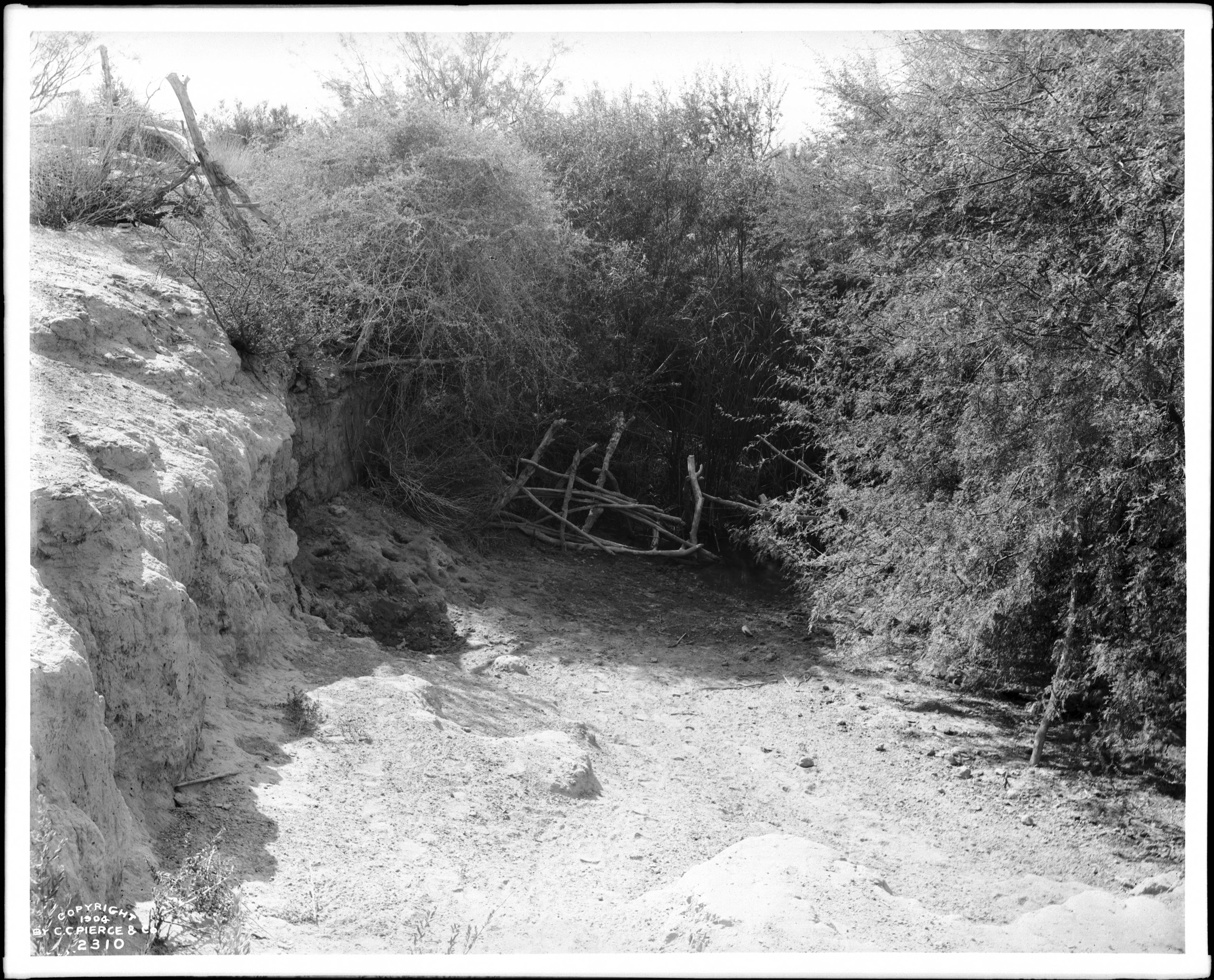
an artesian well at the village of Paltuksnish (Martinez), a stop on the trail where Romero and his men met a Cahuilla leader the Mexicans called Juamay on December 30, 1823.

In January 1847, Mexican California resistance leader José María Flores escaped to Sonora with around 36 Mexican soldiers after their defeat at the Battle of La Mesa. Romero followed the Cahuilla–Halchidhoma trail, passing east of the San Gorgonio Pass into Dos Palmas, then across the Algodones Dunes, and finally reached the Yuma Crossing. At the time, the Americans did not know about this route, which ensured his safety from being apprehended by the American military.

In 1850, Dr. Isaac W. Smith leading as Captain of a wagon train, arrives in San Bernardino from Iowa. He followed General Flores' route from Yuma to San Bernardino via the San Gorgonio Pass.

In November 1853, Second lieutenant Robert S. Williamson led a military expedition to survey an optimal train route for the Southern Pacific railroad known as the Pacific Railroad Surveys. Williamson surveyed the San Gorgonio Pass and the Coachella Valley, at the eastern foothills of San Jacinto & Santa Rosa Mountains.

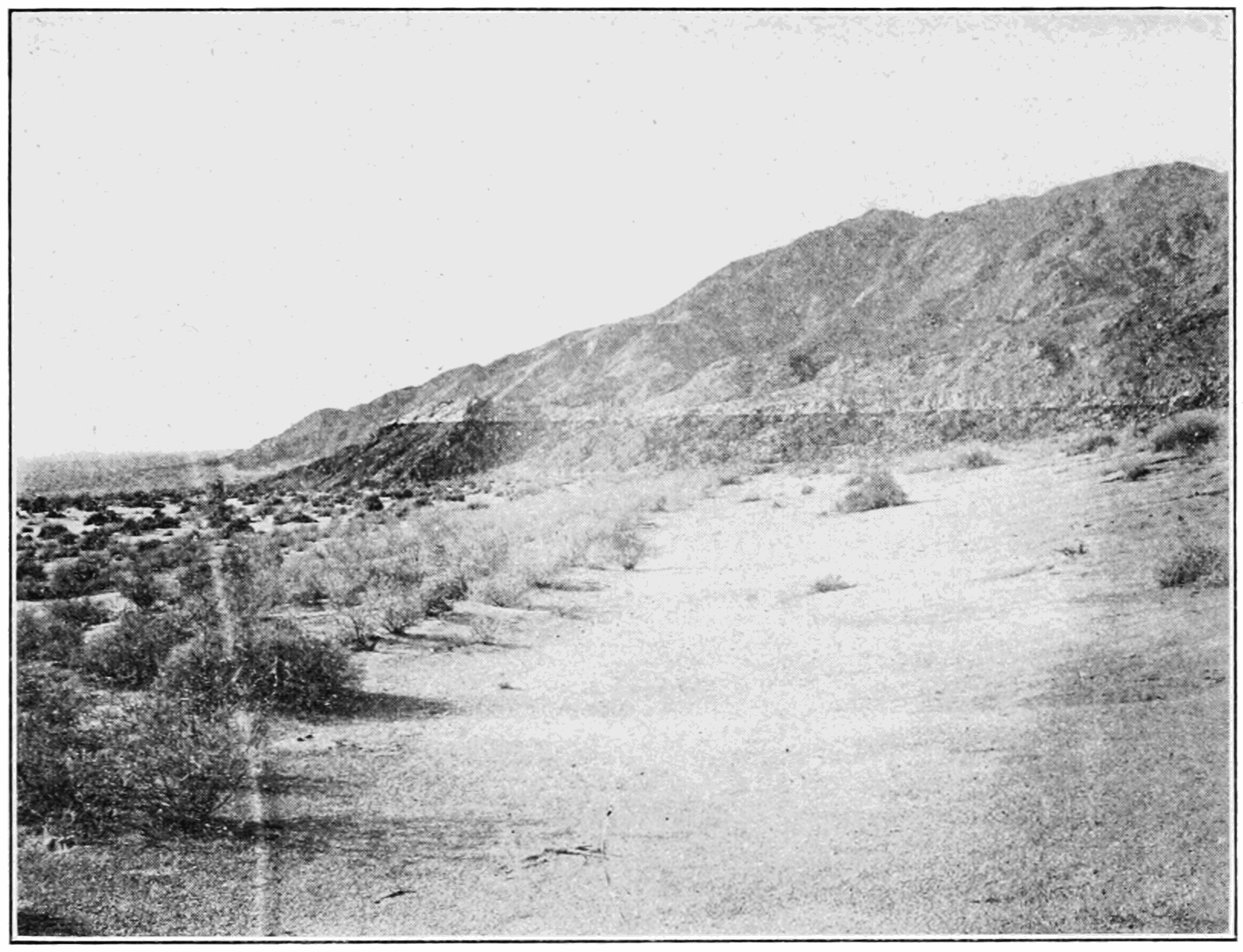
Traveling south on the trail near Toro village, Robert Williamson wrote of an ancient water line left from the ancient Lake Cahuilla, still visible today

In December 1855, Surveyor James Greer McDonald mapped section boundaries from San Gorgonio to the Colorado River, using the trail.

=== Smith Survey ===
In September 1857, as part of petitioning the John Butterfield mail route to pass from Yuma to San Bernardino, instead of Los Angeles or San Diego, a public petition was presented to the board of Supervisors asking a road be surveyed from San Bernardino to the frontier of the Colorado Desert into Yuma. Dr. Isaac W. Smith from San Gorgonio Pass is elected to lead the survey retracing his route seven years ago, he established the exact route to be later re-discovered by Bradshaw, However at Dos Palmas Oasis, Smith's party turned directly South towards Algodones Dunes then to Yuma. This expedition was named the "Smith Survey".

In January 1858, a Butterfield road scout, Captain Kenyon made use of the trail leading a wagon party through the "Smith Survey trail".

In Summer 1858, during the June–August months, Warren Hall, the Southern California Division Superintendent, organized a working party to set up water points and sink wells, and to build stage stations along the trail. Stations were erected at White Water and Agua Caliente. In August, efforts were abandoned after finding it impossible to develop water stops over the one hundred miles of wagon road between Dos Palmas and Yuma, through the arid Algodones Dunes. The Butterfield Overland Mail was not awarded to San Bernardino.

=== Golden era ===
==== 1862 ====
In January 1862, Pauline Weaver, who had a ranch in San Gorgonio Pass, struck Gold on the banks of the Colorado River on the California-Arizona Border.

In March During the initial phase of the American Civil War Company A. 1st California Cavalry Regiment the vanguard of the California Column under Captain William McCleave left Camp Carleton in San Bernardino towards the San Gorgonio Pass, onto Yuma Crossing via the Coachella Valley to contest Confederate presence in the newly established Confederate Arizona on the east bank of the Colorado River. The Cavalry Unit engages the Confederates in two battles in Arizona.

In April, after receiving the news of the gold strike in the Colorado River, William Bradshaw gathered a posse of eight adventurers and led their path eastward of Los Angeles. On May 18, they took the stagecoach to San Bernardino and went on foot until they reached the Mormon settlement of Fort San Bernardino. From here, William went through San Timoteo Canyon to Duff Weaver's residence, brother of Pauline the prospector who reported the claim. They kept heading east until they reached Saahatpa, where they encountered Juan Antonio, the chief of the village. After passing Dr. Smith's Ranch and entering San Gorgonio Pass. They camp next to Whitewater River at the entrance of the Coachella Valley. The next morning at dawn, they march into unfamiliar territory, they follow the trail south through the eastern foothills of San Jacinto & Santa Rosa Mountains. Bradshaw reaches Toro Village where he befriends Cahuilla chief Cabazon, so much so that Cabazon and a traveling Cocomaricopa Native, illustrate a map of the remaining trail to the Colorado River. Bradshaw travels to Dos Palmas Oasis, through the Chuckwalla and Mule Mountains to Providence Point, on the Colorado River's shore. Bradshaw began his Ferry service on June 16, 1862.

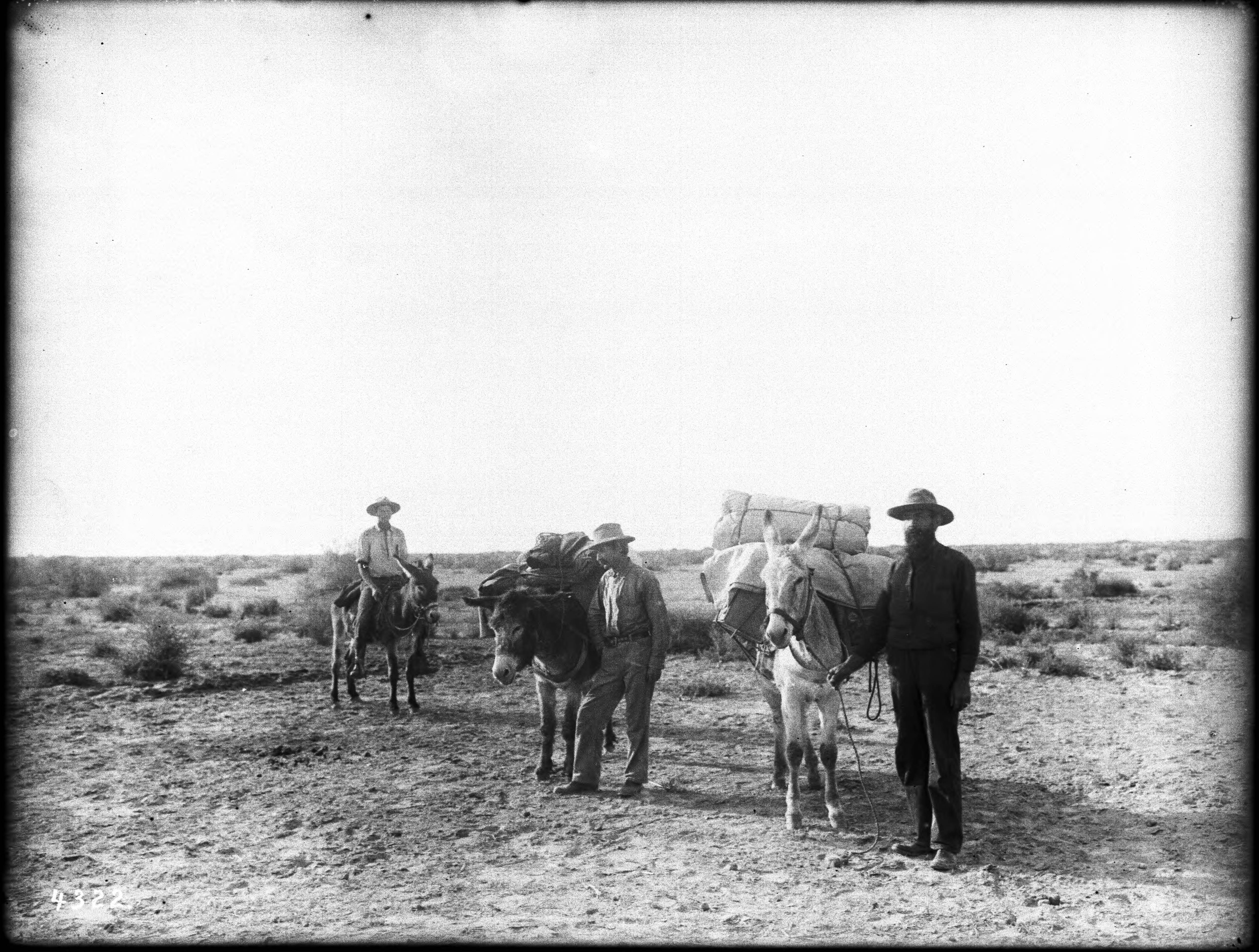
travelers have used the trail since ancient times

He renamed it to Bradshaw Road it was referred to other names like Road to La Paz, or Gold Road, A former forty-niner, Bradshaw knew that the northern gold mines were rapidly becoming exhausted and that the flood of refugees from the area would need a more direct trail from the south across the desert to the new strike at La Paz. Without a direct trail, it would be necessary to travel a great distance southeast to Yuma, then north up the river to La Paz. Bradshaw was also aware of the financial possibilities that could be found in a gold boomtown.

Originally 180 miles (290 km) long, the western trailhead began east of San Bernardino in the San Gorgonio Pass. Bradshaw and his party traveled southeast through Agua Caliente, now Palm Springs, and then South to a village where the Torres Martinez Indian Reservation is now located. There, Bradshaw was befriended by Cabazon, a chief of the Cahuilla Indians of the Salton Sink, and a Maricopa from Arizona who was visiting the Cahuilla villages. They provided Bradshaw with the knowledge of the route of their ancient trade route through the Colorado Desert, including the location of springs and water holes.

Armed with this information, Bradshaw traveled eastward near present-day Mecca at the northern tip of the Salton Sink, to Bitter Spring at the foothills of the Orocopia Mountains and on 5 miles to an existing stage stop called "Dos Palmas Spring." Leaving Dos Palmas, the men continued through the pass eastward between the Orocopia and Chocolate mountain ranges, briefly skirting the southern end of the Chuckwalla range, crossed through a gap in the Mule Mountains and reaching the Palo Verde Valley two miles southwest of the modern community of Ripley. Despite the fact that the trail crossed mostly barren desert, water was reasonably plentiful with water holes found at roughly 30-mile (48 km) intervals at Canyon Springs, Tabaseca Tanks, Chuckwalla Springs, and Mule Spring.

Crossing the Palo Verde Valley to the northwest, they crossed a slough of the Colorado River called Laguna, and Willow Springs Station, to Bradshaw's Ferry, the crossing point of the Colorado River to Mineral City east of what is now Blythe. Once they crossed the Colorado River, the party rode upstream for approximately five miles to the gold fields of La Paz.

Between 1862 and 1877, the Bradshaw Trail was the main stagecoach and wagon route between Southern California and the gold fields of La Paz and other places in western Arizona. The La Paz - Wickenburg Road connected the Bradshaw Trail to the interior of the Arizona Territory and the mining districts there. Olive City was the first Bradshaw ferry crossing for the trail from 1862 to 1864. With the founding of Mineral City, which became the new Bradshaw ferry crossing, Mineral City became part of Ehrenberg when it was established in 1866.

From 1870, the trail ended and connected with the toll road to Wickenburg at Ehrenberg, as La Paz became a ghost town when its mines played out.

=== Southern Pacific Rail Road ===
Southern Pacific constructed a railroad connecting Yuma to San Bernardino via the Coachella Valley. The railroad began construction in 1879 and was completed in 1883.

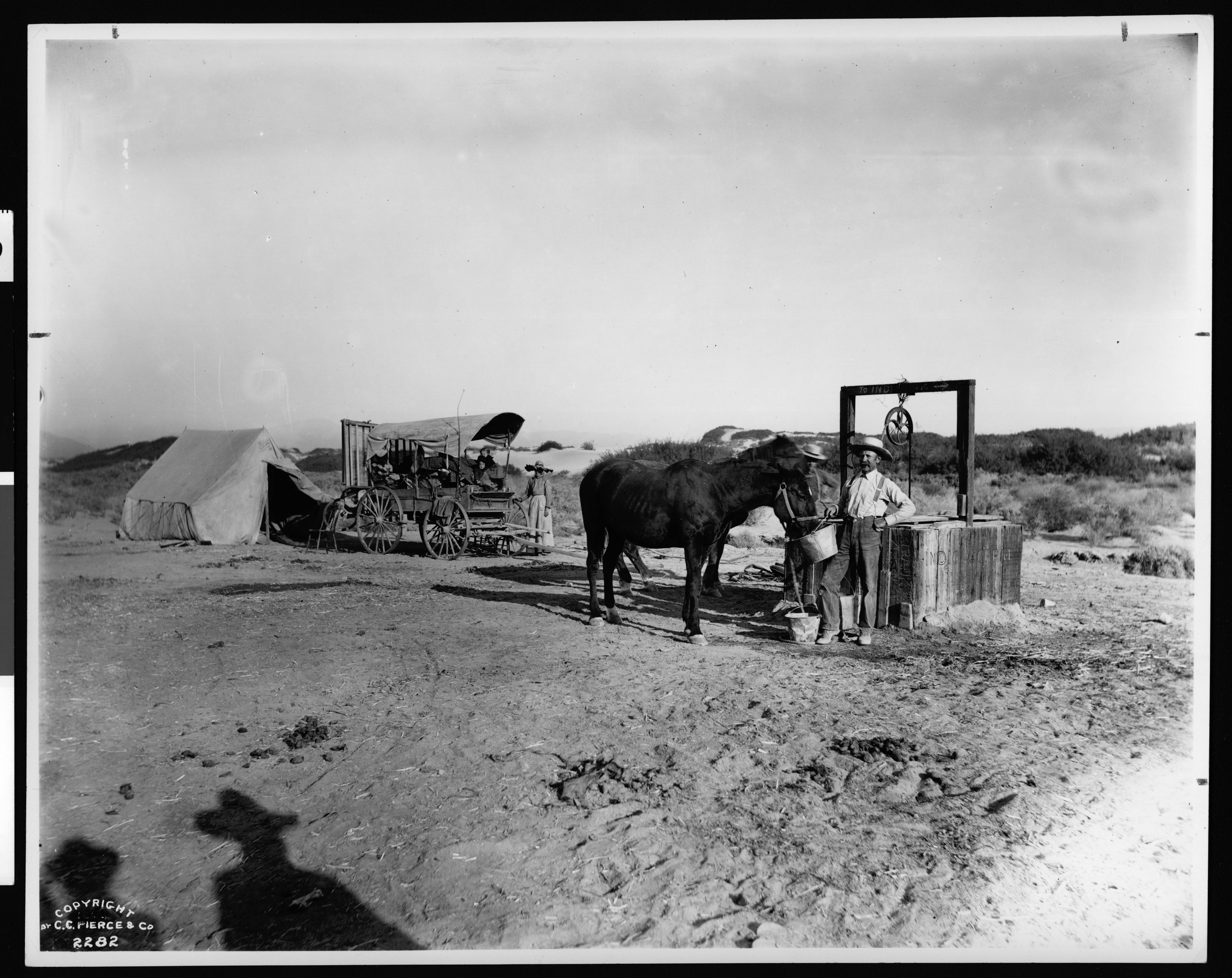
Travelers on the route near Indian Wells

From September 1905 to February 1907, the Colorado River overflowed into the Salton Sink, the engineering disaster led to the creation of the modern Salton Sea. The disaster permanently inundated part of the trail near the northern tip of the Salton Sink & several SPRR rail stations.

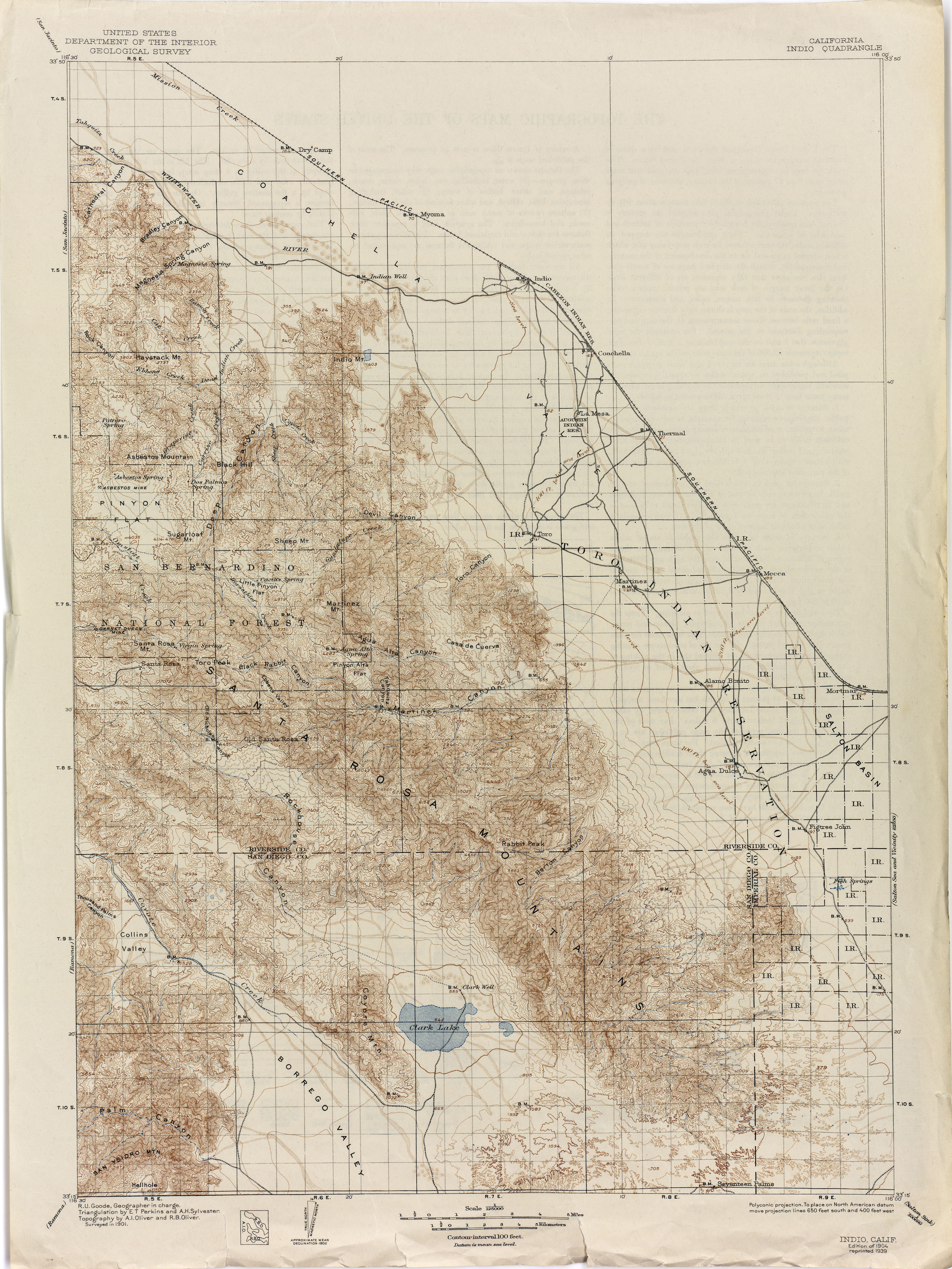
1901 Map illustrating the trail running adjacent to the San Jacinto/Santa Rosa mountains (top half of map)

=== Old Dirt Road ===
In the early 20th century, long-distance travel was dominated by railroads and early highways, not old wagon roads. The Bradshaw route survives mostly as a rough local road across public lands, used by ranchers, survey/utility crews, and miners accessing claims in the Mountains.

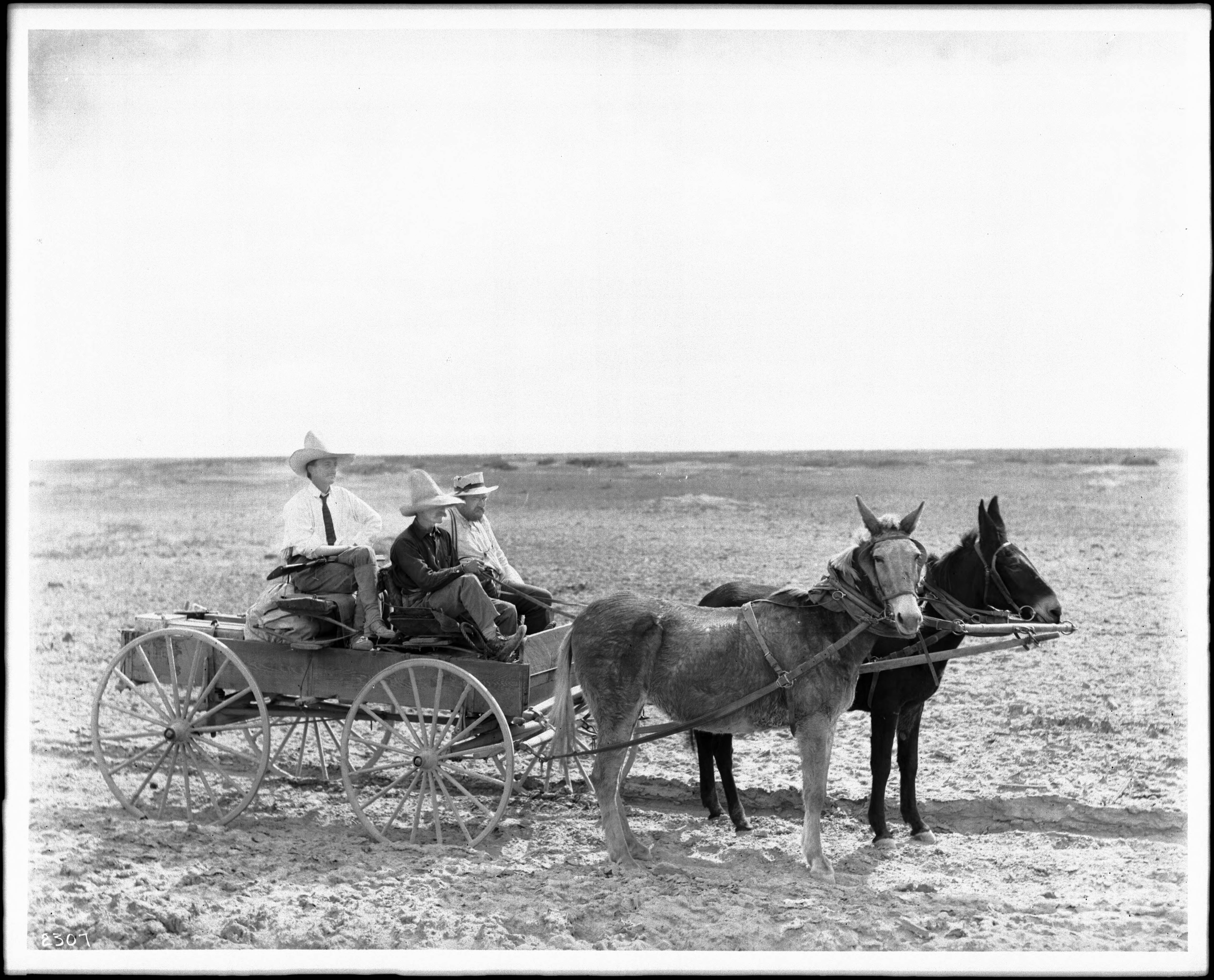
Travelers on the trail, 1903

The Coachella Canal began construction in the 1930s. Trenching was done at the base of the Orocopia Mountains. This construction development split the historic Cahuilla-Halchidhoma trail in two at the Dos Palmas Oasis. The Cahuilla portion of the trail that traversed from San Timoteo Canyon to Dos Palmas was forever lost to urban development. Only the Halchidhoma section of the trail from Dos Palmas to the Colorado River remains to the present date.

In 1942, the Desert Training Center began operation, established by Major General George S. Patton, Jr. in response to a need to train American combat troops for battle in North Africa during World War II. Over one million men were trained at the eleven sub-camps scattered throughout the California Desert. Patton's Throne is the nickname given to a specific observation point hill near the Bradshaw trail on the Chuckwalla mountain range south of Camp Young Headquarters. General George S. Patton Jr. is said to have overseen tank maneuvers during World War II training exercises.

In 1948, County maps began labeling the route as the Butterfield Trail.

In June 1974, the trail was renamed from the Butterfield Trail to the Bradshaw Trail by the Riverside County Board of Supervisors.

In 1992, the Bureau of Land Management (BLM) designated the surviving California portion of the route as the Bradshaw Trail National Back Country Byway.

On January 14, 2025, the Chuckwalla National Monument was established in the final days of Joe Biden’s US presidency. The remaining section of the Bradshaw Trail is located entirely within the park’s boundary.

== Contemporary route ==
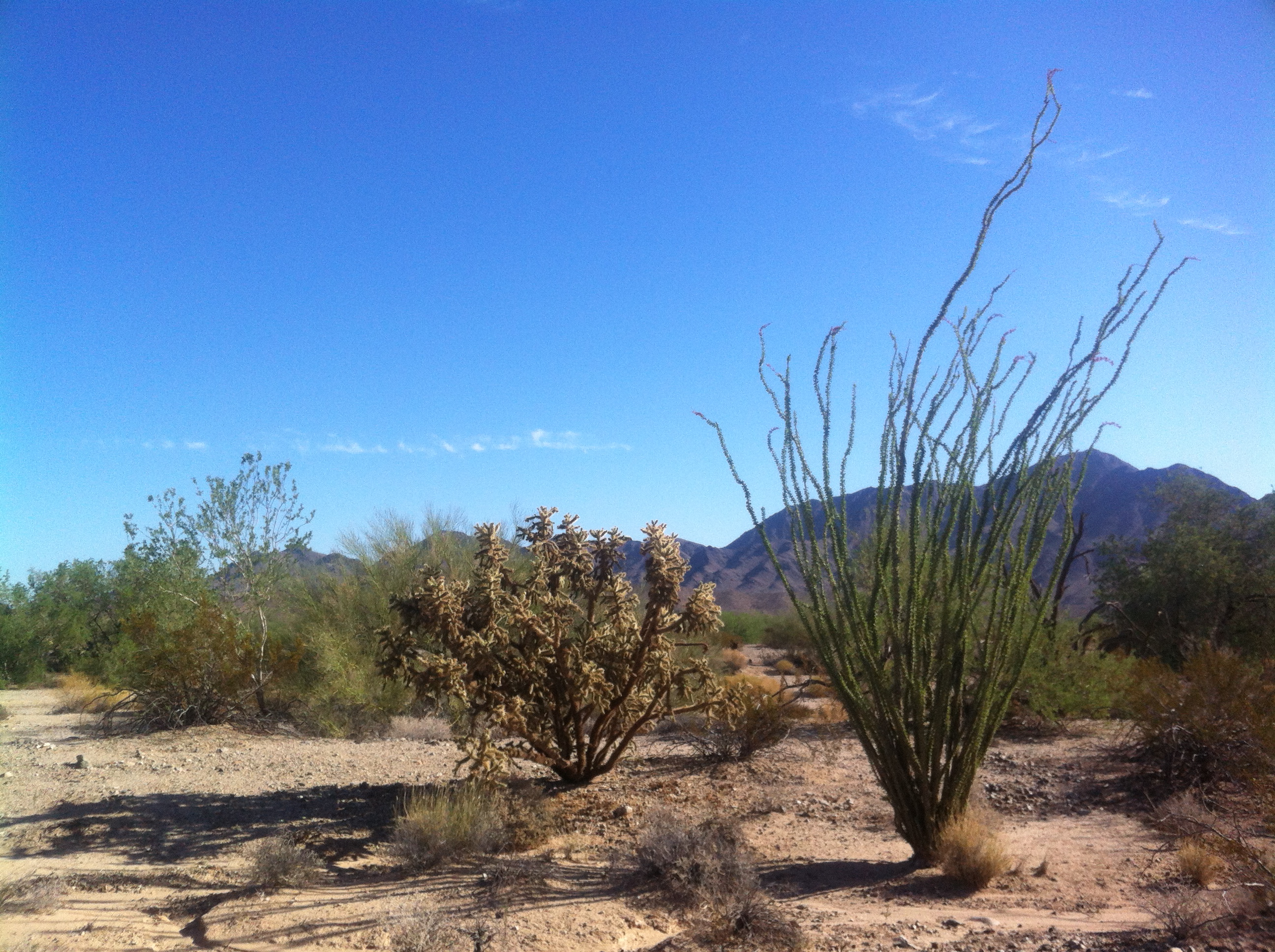
Desert flora of the trail, August 2015.

The western start of the current Bradshaw trail begins, 10 miles (16 km) east of North Shore, California adjacent to the trail's historic stagecoach station of Dos Palmas. The remaining fragment mostly passes through Public land (Chuckwalla National Monument), and offers sweeping views of the Orocopia, Chuckwalla, and Mule Mountains. The extreme eastern end of the trail at Ripley, California, intersects 30th Avenue, 2 miles (3.2 km) west of SR 78. Four Wheel Drive vehicles are recommended because of sections of soft sand. No amenities may be found on the trail itself.

The Bradshaw Trail National Backcountry Byway is overseen by the Bureau of Land Management’s Palm Springs–South Coast Field Office.

The Chocolate Mountain Aerial Gunnery Range, which borders a part of the Bradshaw Trail to the south, is a live bombing range and is clearly posted as such.

== Route mileage ==
Bradshaw Trail Distances San Bernardino, California to La Paz, Arizona Territory, 1875
Location	Distance between stations	Distance from San Bernardino, California
St. Clair Ranche, California	18 mi (29 km)	18 mi (29 km)
Gilman Ranch, California	12.7 mi (20.4 km)	30.7 mi (49.4 km)
White River Station, California	13.5 mi (21.7 km)	44.2 mi (71.1 km)
Agua Caliente, California	10.2 mi (16.4 km)	54.4 mi (87.5 km)
Indian Wells, California	18.5 mi (29.8 km)	72.9 mi (117.3 km)
Toro Village, California	12.0 mi (19.3 km)	84.9 mi (136.6 km)
Martinez Village, California	4.1 mi (6.6 km)	89 mi (143 km)
Lone Palm/Bitter Spring, California	14.1 mi (22.7 km)	103.1 mi (165.9 km)
Dos Palmas Station, California	3.0 mi (4.8 km)	106.1 mi (170.8 km)
Canyon Spring, California	11.4 mi (18.3 km)	117.5 mi (189.1 km)
Chuckawalla Well, California	29.6 mi (47.6 km)	147.1 mi (236.7 km)
Mule Spring, California	21.0 mi (33.8 km)	168.1 mi (270.5 km)
Palo Verde Laguna, California	14.3 mi (23.0 km)	182.4 mi (293.5 km)
Willow Spring Station, California	6.8 mi (10.9 km)	189.2 mi (304.5 km)
Bradshaw's Ferry, California	9.2 mi (14.8 km)	198.4 mi (319.3 km)
Mineral City, Arizona Territory ferry 1864–1866	0.5 mi (0.80 km)	198.9 mi (320.1 km)
Ehrenberg, Arizona Territory ferry from 1866	0.5 mi (0.80 km)	199.4 mi (320.9 km)
Olive City, Arizona Territory ferry 1862–1864	0.5 mi (0.80 km)	199.9 mi (321.7 km)
La Paz, Arizona Territory; 1862–1869	4.5 mi (7.2 km)	204.4 mi (328.9 km)

== See also ==
- List of Riverside County, California, placename etymologies#Bradshaw
- Dos Palmas Spring
- Chuckwalla National Monument
