= Torres, Riverside County, California =

Unincorporated community in California, United States

Coordinates: 33.5900°N 116.2317°W

Torres is a locale on land of the Torres-Martinez Desert Cahuilla Indians in Riverside County, California.

Torres is the site of the former Cahuilla village known as Los Toros. Immediately south of that site is the Toro Cemetery. Los Toros was a stage stop between Indian Wells and Martinez on the Bradshaw Trail from 1866 to the 1880s.
