= Mecca, California =

Mecca Walters
- Census-designated place
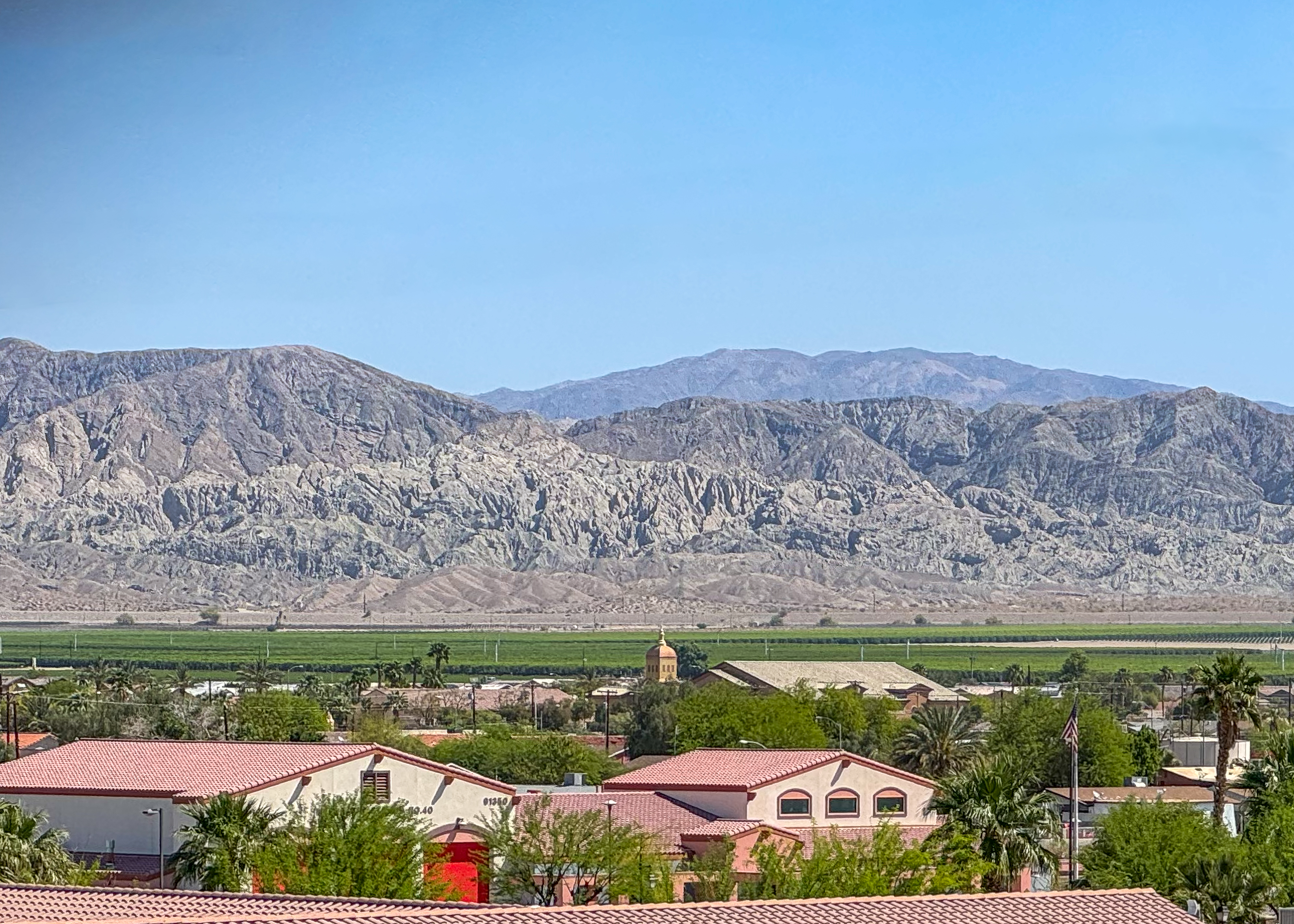
- Mecca, California with Mecca Hills

- Location in Riverside County and the state of California

- Location in the United States Mecca (California) Mecca (the United States)
- Coordinates: 33°34′18″N 116°04′38″W
- Country: United States
- State: California
- County: Riverside
- Settled: 1870's
- Named for: Mecca, for its climate

Area
  - Total: 6.959 sq mi (18.023 km^{2})
  - Land: 6.959 sq mi (18.023 km^{2})
  - Water: 0 sq mi (0 km^{2}) 0%
- Elevation: −187 ft (−57 m)

Population (April 1, 2020)
  - Total: 8,219
  - Density: 1,181/sq mi (456.0/km^{2})
- Time zone: UTC-8 (Pacific)
  - Summer (DST): UTC-7 (PDT)
- ZIP code: 92254
- Area codes: 442/760
- FIPS code: 06-46660
- GNIS feature IDs: 1652751 and 2408811 (CDP)

Mecca is an unincorporated community located in Riverside County, California, United States. The desert community lies on the north shore of the Salton Sea in the Eastern Coachella Valley and is surrounded by agricultural land. As of the 2020 census, Mecca had a population of 8,219.

== Geography and climate ==
1904 Drawing of Mecca, CA

Situated in the Colorado Desert, Mecca has a hot arid climate (Köppen: BWh), experiencing an annual average maximum temperature of 88.5 °F or 31.4 °C. Low temperatures can reach below 30 °F or −1.1 °C. The community sits under 150 feet or 46 meters below sea level on the edge of the Salton Sea.

Land developers intending to irrigate the desert with water from the Colorado River did not foresee excess snow melt, and for two years from 1905 to 1906 accidentally re-routed the entirety of the river to the Salton Sink, flooding the salt mines that had been a source of salt for perhaps centuries and giving rise to the Salton Sea. Groundwater and water transported via the Coachella Canal have transformed the desert environment into large swaths of agricultural land.

The highest temperature recorded in Mecca was 126 °F or 52.2 °C on September 2, 1950 and June 26, 1990, holding the record for the highest temperature recorded on Earth in September until it reached 127 °F or 52.8 °C in Death Valley in 2022. Annual rainfall averages 3.05 inches or 77.5 millimeters, with the wettest "rain year" being from July 1991 to June 1992 when 8.85 inches or 224.8 millimeters fell, and the driest from July 1995 to June 1996 with only 0.19 inches or 4.8 millimeters. The wettest month has been September 1976 with 5.67 inches or 144.0 millimeters, and the wettest day September 11, 1976 with 4.00 inches or 101.6 millimeters – one-third more than the average annual rainfall.

Climate data for Mecca, California (1991–2020 normals, extremes 1905–2019)
Month	Jan	Feb	Mar	Apr	May	Jun	Jul	Aug	Sep	Oct	Nov	Dec	Year
Record high °F (°C)	93 (34)	100 (38)	107 (42)	110 (43)	119 (48)	126 (52)	125 (52)	123 (51)	126 (52)	117 (47)	100 (38)	91 (33)	126 (52)
Mean maximum °F (°C)	82.5 (28.1)	87.2 (30.7)	93.8 (34.3)	100.9 (38.3)	107.5 (41.9)	113.3 (45.2)	116.5 (46.9)	116.8 (47.1)	113.5 (45.3)	103.9 (39.9)	92.0 (33.3)	81.8 (27.7)	119.1 (48.4)
Mean daily maximum °F (°C)	70.4 (21.3)	73.9 (23.3)	80.8 (27.1)	86.9 (30.5)	94.6 (34.8)	102.5 (39.2)	106.6 (41.4)	106.2 (41.2)	101.5 (38.6)	91.2 (32.9)	78.0 (25.6)	68.9 (20.5)	88.5 (31.4)
Daily mean °F (°C)	57.2 (14.0)	60.6 (15.9)	67.3 (19.6)	73.0 (22.8)	80.4 (26.9)	87.4 (30.8)	93.3 (34.1)	93.2 (34.0)	87.6 (30.9)	76.6 (24.8)	64.2 (17.9)	55.5 (13.1)	74.7 (23.7)
Mean daily minimum °F (°C)	43.9 (6.6)	47.2 (8.4)	53.8 (12.1)	59.2 (15.1)	66.3 (19.1)	72.3 (22.4)	80.0 (26.7)	80.2 (26.8)	73.7 (23.2)	62.1 (16.7)	50.4 (10.2)	42.1 (5.6)	60.9 (16.1)
Mean minimum °F (°C)	29.4 (−1.4)	33.5 (0.8)	38.6 (3.7)	44.3 (6.8)	51.8 (11.0)	59.7 (15.4)	65.2 (18.4)	65.0 (18.3)	58.1 (14.5)	46.7 (8.2)	35.6 (2.0)	28.0 (−2.2)	26.5 (−3.1)
Record low °F (°C)	13 (−11)	19 (−7)	23 (−5)	34 (1)	38 (3)	48 (9)	53 (12)	51 (11)	45 (7)	28 (−2)	24 (−4)	18 (−8)	13 (−11)
Average rainfall inches (mm)	0.60 (15)	0.56 (14)	0.32 (8.1)	0.17 (4.3)	0.01 (0.25)	0.00 (0.00)	0.21 (5.3)	0.08 (2.0)	0.30 (7.6)	0.23 (5.8)	0.20 (5.1)	0.37 (9.4)	3.05 (77)
Average rainy days (≥ 0.01 in)	2.8	1.6	1.1	0.5	0.2	0.0	0.5	0.6	0.7	0.7	0.7	1.4	10.8
Source: NOAA (mean maxima/minima 1981–2010)

== Landmarks ==
In 1999, California Rural Legal Assistance, Inc., filed 30 complaints of discrimination against Riverside County. The U.S. Department of Housing and Urban Development investigated the complaints and determined that Riverside County's housing policies and code enforcement activities demonstrated a pattern of discrimination against Latino renters and homeowners. The county agreed to construct the Farmworker Service Center as part of a multimillion-dollar settlement agreement entered into to avoid further litigation. The Farmworker Service Center was inaugurated in 2005 and houses a health clinic, day care facility, offices for the Economic Development Department, and provides information and referrals to government services that can be accessed by the community's largely farmworker population.

Following the construction of the Farmworker Service Center, the county committed to other investments including the Mecca-North Shore Community Library and the Mecca Fire Station, both inaugurated in 2011.

Also in 2011, the Boys & Girls Club of Coachella Valley opened its biggest unit in California. Located next door to the Mecca Community Service Center, the club presently serves c. 350 children from Mecca and surrounding areas.

== Waste and landfill ==
The Mecca Landfill II is located on 66th Avenue in Mecca. It handles 452,182 cubic yards of waste and has an expected closure date in 2098.

The Mecca Remediation Facility, which handles contaminated soil, is located on Gene Welmas Way in Mecca. The facility is operated by Scape Group, Inc. Since 2009, the facility accepted contaminated soil, treated sewage sludge, soy whey, and other organic compostables. In 2011, residents' complaints of offending smells resembling rotten eggs, human waste, raw sewage, burnt motor oil, and petroleum traced back to sulfur compounds from the soy whey pond operated by Waste Reduction Technologies (WRT).

== Government ==
In the Riverside County Board of Supervisors, Thousand Palms is in 4th District, Represented by Democrat V. Manuel Perez Supervisor of the 4th District

In the California State Legislature, Mecca is in the 18th senatorial district, represented by Democrat Steve Padilla, and in the 36th Assembly district, represented by Republican Jeff Gonzalez.

In the United States House of Representatives, Mecca is in California's 25th congressional district, represented by Democrat Raul Ruiz.

== In popular culture ==
Mecca was a featured location in Roger Corman's 1966 film The Wild Angels, starring Peter Fonda, Nancy Sinatra and Bruce Dern. This film inspired the outlaw biker film genre, and marks Peter Fonda's first appearance as a biker - three years prior to Easy Rider. Mecca was also the setting for the 1990 neo-noir film After Dark, My Sweet, directed by James Foley and starring Jason Patric, Bruce Dern, and Rachel Ward.

Susan Straight's novel, Mecca, is set in the community.

== History ==
=== Indigenous Cahuilla ===
For many eras, the Desert Cahuilla's native home was the Coachella Valley. The Cahuillas would travel from their village in Martinez to Dos Palmas Spring via an ancient Native American trail known as the Cocomaricopa/Halchidoma Trail. This trail traversed just south of the town of Mecca.

=== Spanish Explorers ===
Spanish Explorer Melchior Diaz is the first non-indigenous person to set foot and explore inland California in December 1540 near the Yuma Crossing and Imperial Valley (95 miles southeast from Mecca).

Legend of Juan de Iturbe's Lost Pearl Ship in the Desert is a local legend that after the 1862 Great flood locals reported seeing an ancient Spanish galleon that had beached during a voyage at New Spain's northernmost frontier of water the ancient Lake Cahuilla in 1615. In reported cases, the ship was allegedly seen near Salt Creek (South of Mecca).

Juan Bautista de Anza led a colonizing expedition in 1774, from Mission San Xavier del Bac (Tucson) to San Gabriel Mission (Los Angeles). De Anza traveled through the Imperial Valley just south of Mecca and encountered the native Cahuillas becoming the first Spanish to make contact with the Cahuillas.

Spanish missionaries from the San Gabriel Mission in Los Angeles would make the long journey to collect salt from brine pools near the northern Salton sink (South of Mecca) known as the evaporating ancient Lake Cahuilla in 1810.

=== Mexican 1823 Expedition ===
In 1823 under orders from the Mexican Emperor Agustín de Iturbide to reopen a land route (closed by an Indian Revolt In 1871) from Alta California to Sonora, Captain José Romero and José María Estudillo documented the first recorded expedition into the Coachella Valley. They traversed the Halchidoma Trail and were escorted by the Cahuilla to Dos Palmas Spring (Near Mecca), reaching it on December 31, 1823. They camped for four days before advancing East. Romero's party returned to the Eastern Coachella Valley after getting lost near Palen Lake.

=== Bradshaw Trail ===
in 1862 William D. Bradshaw connected La Paz Gold mines to Los Angeles using the prehistoric Indian Halchidoma Trail and renaming it the Bradshaw Trail. This trail was used by many travelers traversing from Arizona to California. The railroad would eventually replace the stagecoach trail in the late 1870s. The Stagecoach stop of Lone Palm was located South of Mecca near the town of North Shore.

=== Southern Pacific Railroad / Walters Station ===
Southern Pacific constructed a railroad connecting Yuma to Los Angeles. The railroad was completed in 1869. A Railroad Station named Walters was erected and soon the town of Mecca began to populate in the 1870s.

=== Date palms ===
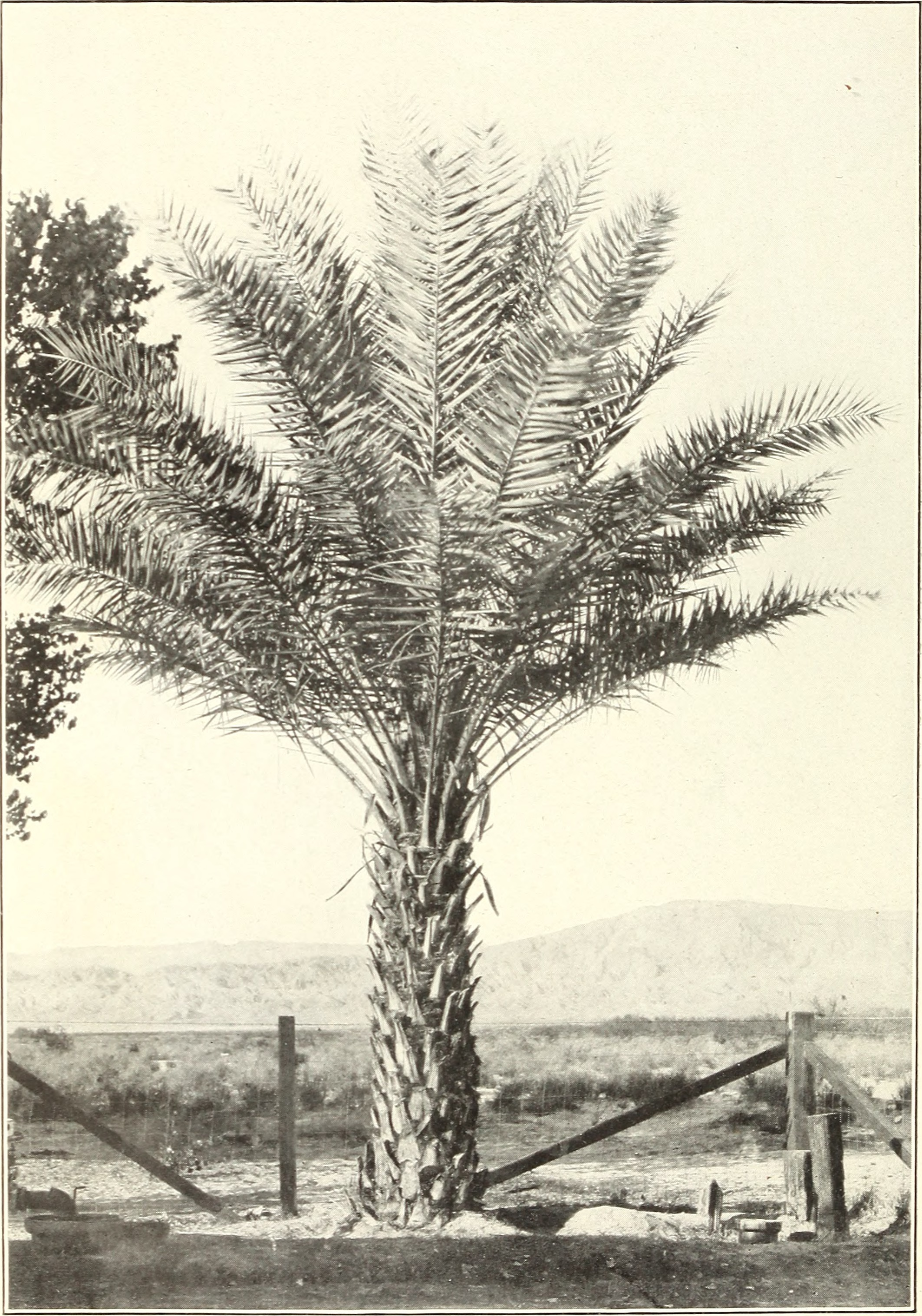
20 year old date palm in Mecca. picture taken in 1915

In the late 1890s, the date palm was introduced to the Coachella Valley. The plant was successfully farmed in Mecca, as the climate in the town was similar to the plant's native climate in the Middle East.

=== Salton Sea ===
Salton Sea creation 1905-1907

From 1905 to February 1907, the Colorado River overflowed into the Salton Sink which had an ancient history of previous lake iterations. This time, the engineering disaster led to the creation of the modern Salton Sea. The flood waters never made it to Mecca although it came close to the Town.

=== Hurricane Kathleen ===
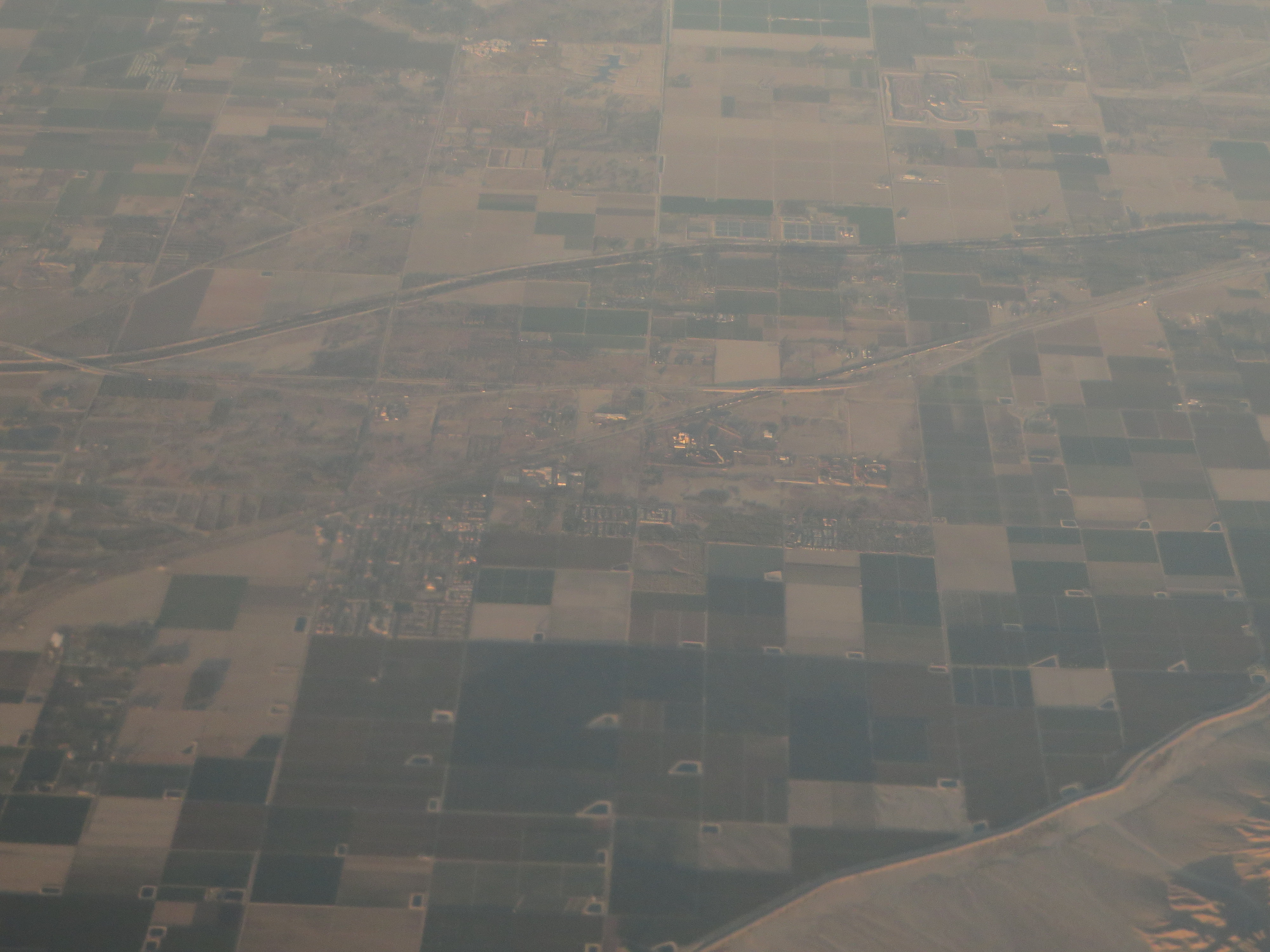
Photograph taken from Space of Mecca in October 2014

On September 7, 1976, a hurricane had a destructive impact on the entire Coachella Valley. This event and further floods in the 1980s stalled progress in the eastern Coachella Valley. In recent history, Mecca has been solidified as an agricultural center for the Eastern Coachella Valley.

== Demographics ==
Historical population
Census	Pop.	Note	%±
1980	1,698		—
1990	1,966		15.8%
2000	5,402		174.8%
2010	8,577		58.8%
2020	8,219		−4.2%
U.S. Decennial Census; 1860–1870 1880-1890; 1900 1910 1920; 1930 1940 1950; 1960 1970 1980; 1990 2000 2010

Mecca first appeared as a census-designated place in the 1980 United States census.

=== Racial and ethnic composition ===
Mecca CDP, California – Racial and ethnic composition Note: the US Census treats Hispanic/Latino as an ethnic category. This table excludes Latinos from the racial categories and assigns them to a separate category. Hispanics/Latinos may be of any race.
Race / Ethnicity (NH = Non-Hispanic)	Pop 2000	Pop 2010	Pop 2020	% 2000	% 2010	% 2020
White alone (NH)	43	57	57	0.80%	0.66%	0.69%
Black or African American alone (NH)	1	9	35	0.02%	0.10%	0.43%
Native American or Alaska Native alone (NH)	16	11	6	0.30%	0.13%	0.07%
Asian alone (NH)	29	14	11	0.54%	0.16%	0.13%
Native Hawaiian or Pacific Islander alone (NH)	0	6	2	0.00%	0.07%	0.02%
Other race alone (NH)	2	11	33	0.04%	0.13%	0.40%
Mixed race or Multiracial (NH)	16	7	22	0.30%	0.08%	0.27%
Hispanic or Latino (any race)	5,295	8,462	8,053	98.02%	98.66%	97.98%
Total	5,402	8,577	8,219	100.00%	100.00%	100.00%

=== 2020 census ===
As of the 2020 census, Mecca had a population of 8,219 and a population density of 1,181.1 inhabitants per square mile (456.0/km^{2}). The median age was 26.6 years. 34.7% of residents were under the age of 18, 12.8% were aged 18 to 24, 26.3% were aged 25 to 44, 20.1% were aged 45 to 64, and 6.0% were 65 years of age or older. For every 100 females there were 106.9 males, and for every 100 females age 18 and over there were 104.7 males age 18 and over.

83.6% of residents lived in urban areas, while 16.4% lived in rural areas. The census reported that 99.8% of the population lived in households, 15 people (0.2%) lived in non-institutionalized group quarters, and no one was institutionalized.

There were 1,895 households in Mecca, of which 62.4% had children under the age of 18 living in them. Of all households, 61.5% were married-couple households, 6.0% were cohabiting couple households, 13.4% were households with a male householder and no spouse or partner present, and 19.1% were households with a female householder and no spouse or partner present. About 7.7% of all households were made up of individuals, and 2.3% had someone living alone who was 65 years of age or older. The average household size was 4.33. There were 1,674 families (88.3% of all households).

There were 2,001 housing units at an average density of 287.5 units per square mile (111.0 units/km^{2}). Of the units, 5.3% were vacant and 94.7% were occupied. The homeowner vacancy rate was 0.5% and the rental vacancy rate was 3.2%. Among occupied units, 44.2% were owner-occupied and 55.8% were occupied by renters.

Racial composition as of the 2020 census
Race	Number	Percent
White	1,842	22.4%
Black or African American	41	0.5%
American Indian and Alaska Native	360	4.4%
Asian	35	0.4%
Native Hawaiian and Other Pacific Islander	4	0.0%
Some other race	4,532	55.1%
Two or more races	1,405	17.1%

=== Employment and education ===
49% of Mecca residents are employed in agricultural work. The community's population fluctuates several times throughout the year with up to an additional 5,000 seasonal farmworkers coming into Mecca to serve the valley's winter and summer harvesting seasons.

Mecca has an elementary school, but no public high school. 1.4% of residents hold a college degree, with 17.7% continuing education after high school, ranking Mecca as the 17th least-educated city in the United States.
