= Ruby Modesto =

Medicine woman, author, educator

- Born: Ruby Eleanor Nombrie; March 23, 1913
- Died: April 7, 1980 (aged 67); Thermal, California
- Burial place: Torrez-Martinez Cemetery
- Citizenship: Torres Martinez Desert Cahuilla Indians and American
- Occupations: medicine woman, language instructor, author
- Notable work: Not for Innocent Ears: Spiritual Traditions of a Desert Cahuilla Medicine Woman (Sweetlight Books, 1980)
- Spouse: David Modesto
- Parents: Lorenzo Nombrie (Desert Cahuilla) (father); Joaquina Nombrie (Serrano) (mother)

Ruby Eleanor Modesto (March 23, 1913 – April 7, 1980) was a Desert Cahuilla medicine woman, author, and cultural educator of Serrano descent from Southern California.

Raised on the Torres-Martinez Reservation, she became known for her efforts to preserve and share Cahuilla spiritual traditions, language, and oral history. In the final years of her life, she collaborated on a number of publications, including Not for Innocent Ears: Spiritual Traditions of a Desert Cahuilla Medicine Woman, which combined autobiographical reflections with tribal teachings and folktales.

== Early life and education ==
Ruby Eleanor Nombrie was born on March 23, 1913, in Coachella Valley and spent her life on the Torres-Martinez Reservation. Her mother, Joaquina, was Serrano from Banning, and her father, Lorenzo Nombrie, was Desert Cahuilla, descended from Francisco Nombrie, a known informant for early anthropologists such as William Duncan Strong.

== Writing and cultural preservation ==
Though her cultural training began in childhood, Modesto's contributions to published anthropology began in the 1970s. In 1977, she co-authored an article with anthropologist Richard Lando titled "Temal Wakhish: A Desert Cahuilla Village," which appeared in the Journal of California Anthropology. The article provided first-hand insight into the structure, values, and daily life of a Cahuilla village.

Her most significant work, Not for Innocent Ears: Spiritual Traditions of a Desert Cahuilla Medicine Woman, was released shortly after her death in 1980. Co-written with Guy Mount, the book blends personal narrative with Cahuilla spiritual teachings and traditional stories. It served as one of the few public records of ceremonial knowledge that had traditionally been passed down orally.

== Language advocacy ==
Modesto also worked to preserve the Cahuilla language and promote its teaching among young tribal citizens. She initiated several informal cultural education efforts, which were later continued by her husband, David Modesto.

== Death ==
Ruby Modesto died of cardiac arrest on April 7, 1980, at her home on the Torres-Martinez Reservation.

== Selected publications ==
- Ruby Eleanor Modesto and Richard Lando (1977). Temal Wakhish: a Desert Cahuilla Village.
- Ruby Modesto and Guy Mount (1980). Not for Innocent Ears: Spiritual Traditions of a Desert Cahuilla Medicine Woman.
