= Martinez, Riverside County, California =

Unincorporated community in California & archaeological site

Martinez Village
- Location within southern California Location within California Location within the United States
- 33°33′44″N 116°09′14″W
- Associated with: Torres-Martinez Cahuilla
- Location: Coachella Valley, USA
- Region: Colorado Desert

History
- Built: c. 7000 BCE

Site notes
- Discovered: 1823; José Romero
- Owner: Torres Martinez Indian Reservation

Martinez (Spanish: Martínez) is a populated place on the lands of the Torres-Martinez Desert Cahuilla Indians in Riverside County, California. It lies at an elevation of −135 feet (−41 meters). Its name derives from 'Martin's House' in Spanish.

== History ==
Spanish presence at San Gorgonio Pass was documented as early as 1809. Spanish missionaries from the San Gabriel Mission would conduct Baptisms of Cahuillas at the Arroyo Blanco River at Wanapiapa Village near Whitewater Canyon. Starting in 1815, missionaries would conduct yearly journeys to collect Salt several miles east of the San Gorgonio Pass in the Salton Sink (Northern Shore of Salton Sea) and close to Martinez Village. Beginning in the very early 1820's Mexican Vaqueros grazing cattle from Rancho San Gorgonio would travel east of the San Gorgonio pass on the trail and into Sec-he, a Cahuilla village with a hot spring. The Spanish named the village Agua Caliente, today known as Palm Springs.

On December 30, 1823, while on the Cahuilla Trail near Indian Wells, a Cahuilla native encountered José Romero, José M. Estudillo and their Soldiers, who are leading an expeditionary mission to Tucson to reestablish land connection between the Mexican provinces of California and Sonora. The Mexicans are escorted to Martinez Village and meet the Cahuilla Chief on whom they call Juamay and are guided to Dos Palmas where they camp for a few days before departing east.

In late May or early June 1862, William D. Bradshaw, traveling from Los Angeles to the Colorado River gold fields ended up on the Cahuilla Trail east of the San Gorgonio Pass. He trails down the path and ends up in Martinez village, where he encounters the Cahuilla Chief Cabazon and a Maricopa native. Bradshaw's personality wooed the natives into guiding him on the Cahuilla-Halchidhoma trail to help him trail-blaze the gold prospectors' route to the gold fields on the banks of the Colorado River.

Martinez village was eventually a water stop, and later a stage station on the Cahuilla-Halchidhoma trail renamed the Bradshaw Trail between San Bernardino and La Paz, Arizona.

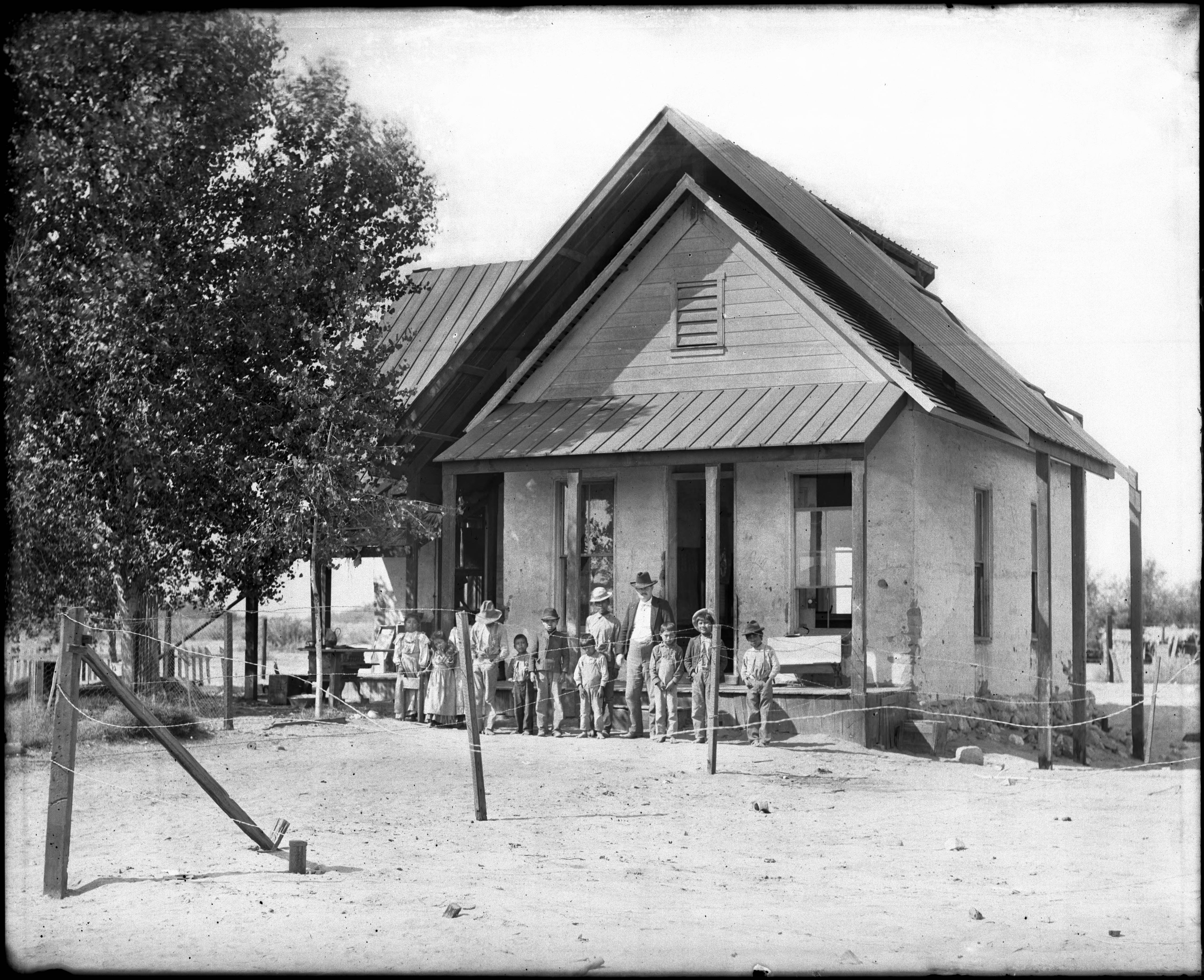
Students with teacher at Martinez Indian school, c.1900's

A schoolhouse built by the federal government in August 1907 still stands in the community to the present date. Considered the oldest standing Indian Agency building in California.

In addition to housing a school, the two-room building was used over the decades for wakes, tribal meetings, and Christmas parties until 1991.

The Torres-Martinez Schoolhouse was restored in January 2012 as a Museum.

Martinez was formerly the site of the headquarters of the Torres Martinez Indian Reservation and the earlier historical headquarters of the 19th century Martinez Indian Agency for the Desert Cahuilla.
