= KHCV (FM) =

- Mecca, California; United States
- Broadcast area: Coachella Valley
- Frequency: 104.3 MHz
- Branding: Tu Familia Radio

Programming
- Language: Spanish
- Format: Contemporary Christian

Ownership
- Owner: Iglesia Pentecostal Vispera Del Fin

History
- First air date: September 5, 2014
- Former call signs: KFUT (2016)

Technical information
- Licensing authority: FCC
- Facility ID: 191492
- Class: A
- ERP: 6,000 watts
- HAAT: 19 meters (62 ft)
- Transmitter coordinates: 33°42′9″N 116°00′41″W
- Translator: 93.1 K226BT (Indio)

Links
- Public license information: Public file; LMS
- Website: lacadenadelafamilia.com

KHCV (104.3 FM, "La Estación de la Familia Radio") is a class A radio station that broadcasts a Spanish Contemporary Christian format from Mecca, California.

== History ==
On September 5, 2014, the station began broadcasting as KFUT before changing its call sign to the current KHCV on February 4, 2016. On September 21, 2020, CV 104.3 flipped from adult contemporary to an oldies format with no other changes.

On August 2, 2021, KHCV changed their format from oldies to Spanish contemporary Christian, branded as "La Estación de la Familia Radio".. A few years later, KHCV would switch to the Tu Familia Radio branding.
