= Salt Creek (Salton Sea) =

Stream in California, United States

Coordinates: 33°26′46″N 115°50′54″W

Salt Creek is a 26-mile-long (42 km) intermittent stream in Riverside County, California, flowing into the north shore of the Salton Sea. Its discharge point is located north of Salt Creek Beach in the Salton Sea State Recreation Area. It is an important habitat of desert pupfish, containing a population of 159 fish. Salt creek is also a birding spot for birds that winter in the Salton Sea.

== Sources ==
- U.S. Geological Survey Geographic Names Information System: Salt Creek
