= Dos Palmas Spring =

Artesian spring in Riverside County, California

- Dos Palmas Oasis in February 2017.

- Location within southern California Location within California Location within the United States
- Name origin: Spanish: Two Palms
- Location: Colorado Desert (Eastern Coachella Valley)
- Coordinates: 33.509°N 115.827°W
- Type: Artesian spring

Dos Palmas
- Ghost town; former stagecoach stop
- Interactive map of Dos Palmas
- Country: United States
- State: California
- County: Riverside
- Mexican Camp: 1823
- Stagecoach Stop: 1862
- Abandoned: 1877
- Named for: Fan Palms
- Elevation: 80 ft (24 m)
- GNIS feature ID: 241575

Dos Palmas Spring (Spanish: Dos Palmas) is an artesian spring at the foot of the Orocopia Mountains in Riverside County, California. It is the most prevalent and historic Spring of several such springs in the area that create an oasis in the Colorado Desert. The spring was a crucial stagecoach stop on the Bradshaw Trail.

== History ==
Dos Palmas Spring was a Watering hole and seasonal village for Cahuilla natives traveling across the Colorado Desert between the Colorado River and San Gorgonio Pass for millennia. The Cahuillas would reach the Springs via a prehistoric trail known as the Cahuilla-Halchidhoma Trail. Dos Palmas also had a Trail connecting to the Yuma Crossing further South.

=== Romero Expedition ===
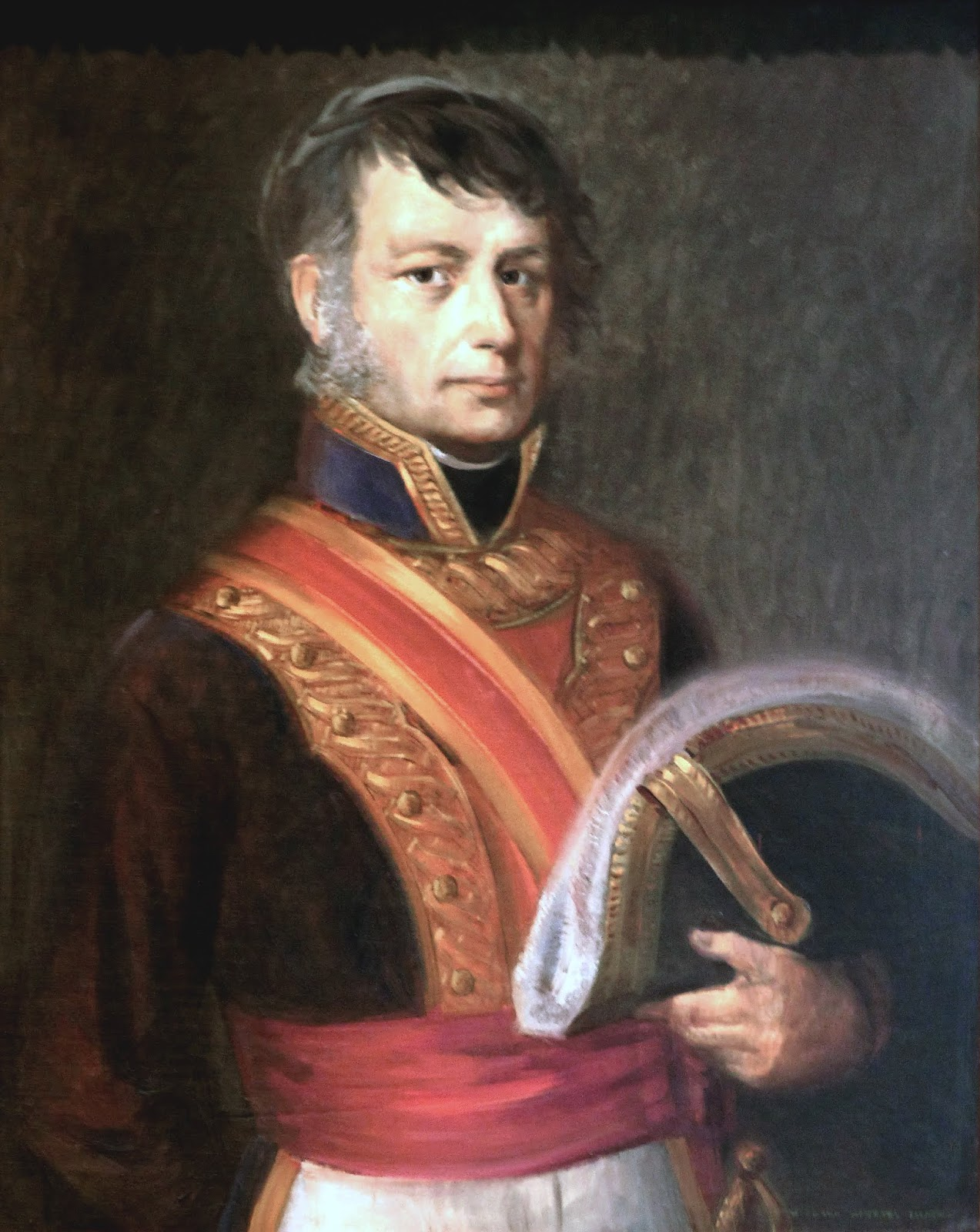
Lieutenant José María Estudillo, Camped with his expeditionary force at Dos Palmas for three days in December 1823.

In December 1823, forty-two years after the main southern trail connecting Mexico to California closed due to a massacre of Spanish settlers perpetrated by Yuma natives, California Governor Argüello ordered Captain José Romero & Lieutenant José María Estudillo to find an alternate overland route from San Gabriel to Tucson. The Party departed from the San Gabriel Mission and tracked east through San Gorgonio Pass into the Colorado Desert, where Cahuillas encountered and escorted them along the Cahuilla–Halchidhoma trail to Dos Palmas Oasis. Captain Romero referred to the Springs as the swamp of the Palms. The Mexican Expeditionary force camped at the spring from December 30, 1823 to January 2, 1824. During their stay, they traded tobacco with the Cahuillas and gave them a horse carcass that had drowned in the springs.

The Romero expedition successfully established a mail courier route into mainland Mexico for communication with the internal provinces. Dos Palmas became a prevalent landmark and rest stop on this route through the Colorado Desert.

In January 1847, Mexican General José María Flores made use of the trail and escaped to Sonora with around 36 Mexican soldiers after their defeat at the Battle of La Mesa. Romero followed the Cahuilla–Halchidhoma trail, passing east of the San Gorgonio Pass into Dos Palmas, then across the Algodones Dunes, and finally reached the Yuma Crossing. At the time, the Americans did not know about this route, which ensured his safety from being apprehended by the American military.

=== Smith Survey ===
In September 1857, as part of petitioning the John Butterfield mail route to pass from Yuma to San Bernardino, instead of Los Angeles or San Diego, a public petition was presented to the board of Supervisors asking that a road be surveyed from San Bernardino to the frontier of the Colorado Desert into Yuma. Dr. Isaac W. Smith from San Gorgonio Pass was elected to lead the survey; Smith previously had retraced General Flores' route 7 years earlier when Smith immigrated into California via the Yuma Crossing. This expedition was named the "Smith Survey".

In Summer 1858, Warren Hall, the Southern California Division Superintendent, organized a working party to set up water points and sink wells, and to build stage stations along the trail. Efforts were abandoned after finding it impossible to develop water stops over the one hundred miles of wagon road between Dos Palmas and Yuma, through the arid Algodones Dunes. The Butterfield Overland Mail was not awarded to San Bernardino.

=== Stagecoach Stop ===
From 1862, Dos Palmas became a camp and watering stop for gold prospectors and other travelers along the Bradshaw Trail between San Bernardino and the gold mining boomtown of La Paz, Arizona and later to nearby Ehrenberg that replaced it. A stage stop called Dos Palmas was established there for the Bradshaw and Yuma roads. This spring and stage station was the site of the murder of Herman Ehrenberg on October 9, 1866.

For a short time in May – June, 1877, there was a post office at that location.

== Preservation area ==
The Dos Palmas Spring is now part of the Dos Palmas Preserve a 14,000-acre preserve created to protect important biological resources. The oasis with its hundreds of desert fan palms and pools fed by artesian springs and seepage from the nearby Coachella Canal form a wetland that offers shelter from the hot, dry Colorado Desert to a variety of both threatened or endangered and more common animal species. These include the endangered Yuma Rail, the Desert Pupfish and the Orocopia Sage.

== Gallery ==
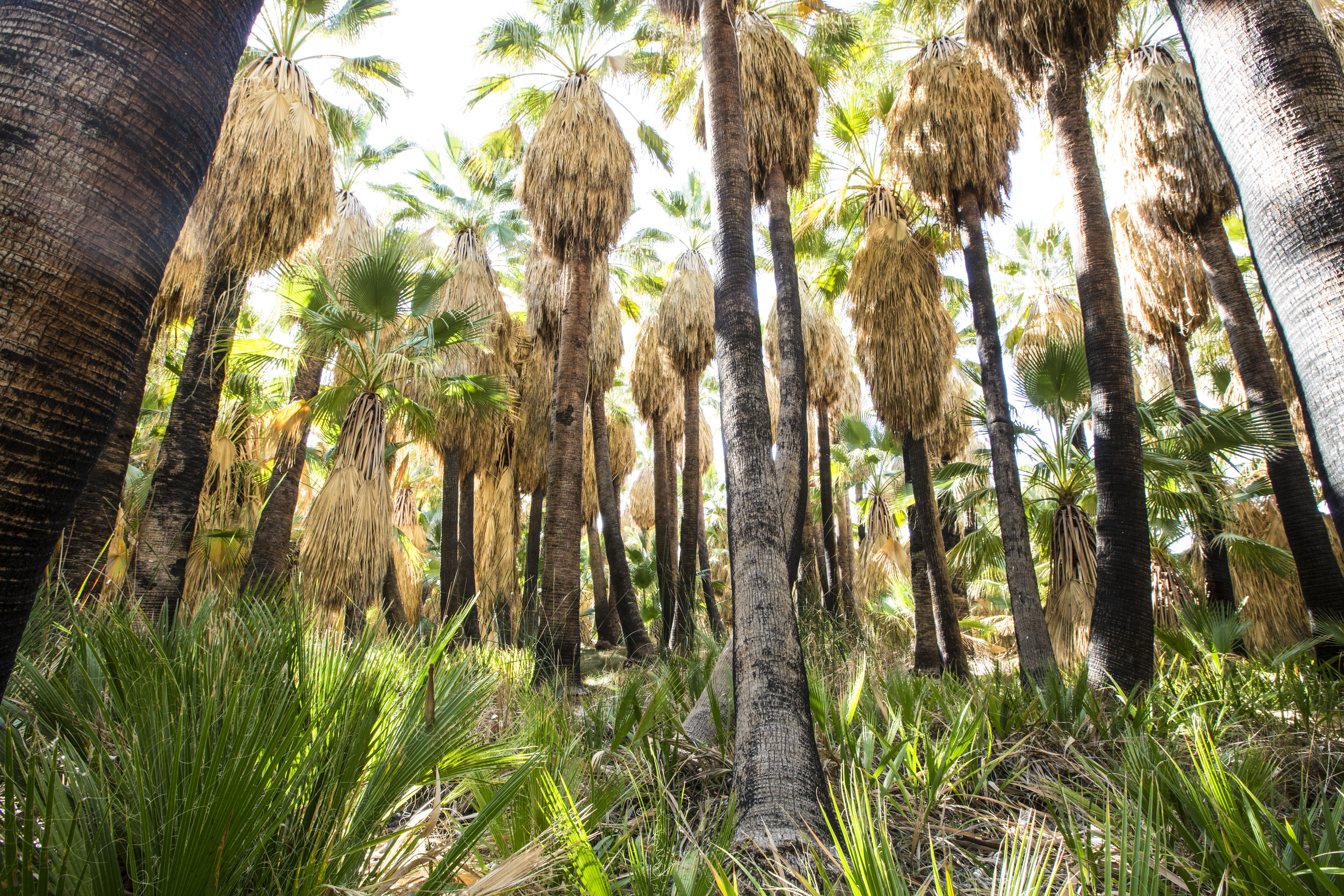
Fan Palms at the Springs

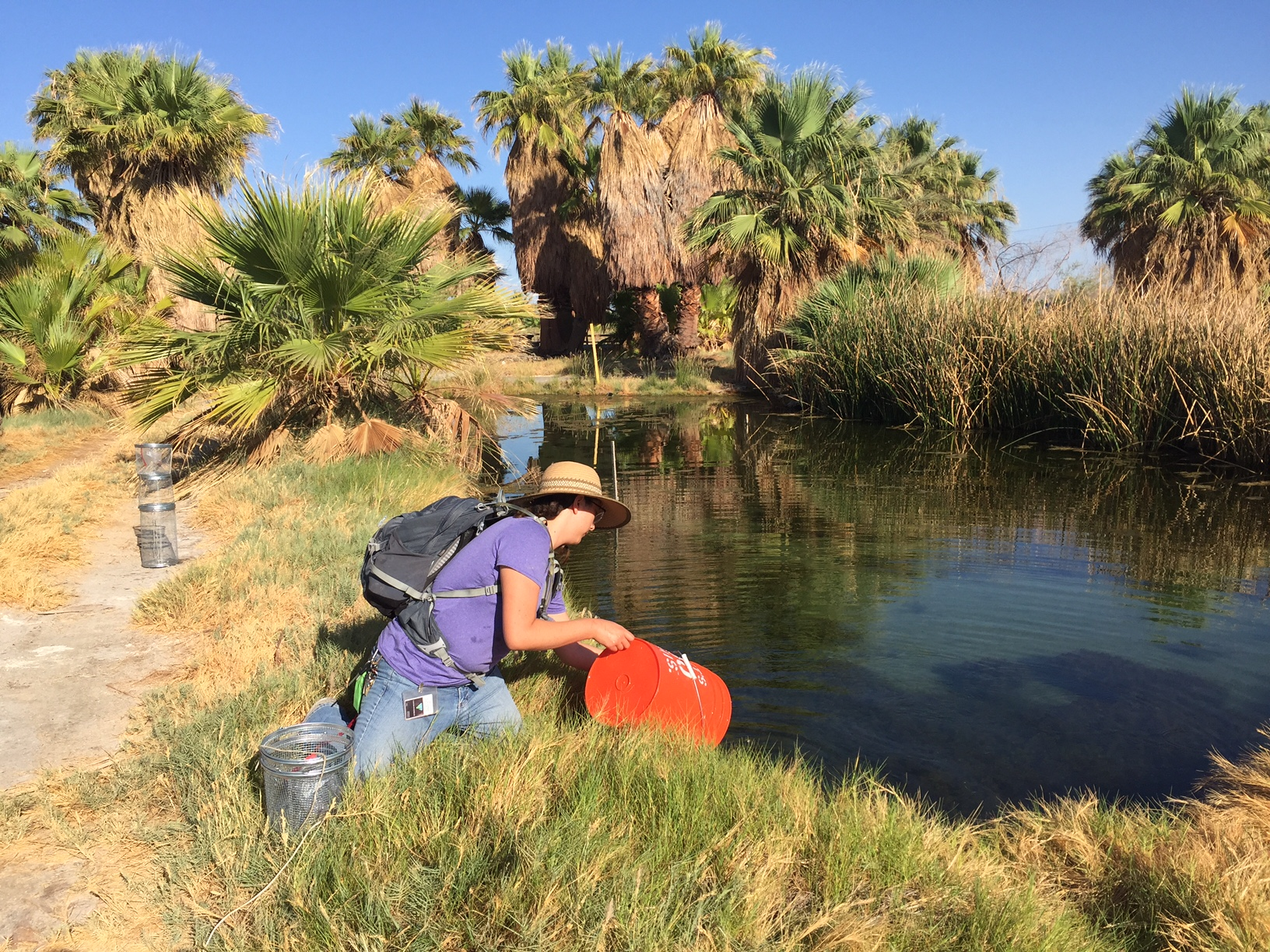
Release of endemic species, the Desert Pupfish

View of San Jacinto Peak from Dos Palmas

Fan Palm on fire, during a controlled burn

Controlled fire at the Spring

Pier at one of the Dos Palmas ponds

Main Spring
