= Torres Martinez Desert Cahuilla Indians =

Native Cahuilla and Chemehuevi Indians in Southern California

Coordinates: 33°33′17″N 116°07′48″W

Sukat-ménill (Cahuilla)

Total population
- 4,146 people living on the reservation

Regions with significant populations
- United States (California)

Languages
- English, Cahuilla language

Religion
- traditional tribal religion, Christianity (Roman Catholicism and Protestantism)

Related ethnic groups
- Cahuilla

The Torres Martinez Desert Cahuilla Indians is a federally recognized tribe of Cahuilla Indians, located in Imperial and Riverside counties in California. Their autonym is Mau-Wal-Mah Su-Kutt Menyil, which means "among the palms, deer moon" in the Cahuilla language.

== Torres Martinez Indian Reservation ==
The Torres Martinez Indian Reservation is a federal reservation in Imperial and Riverside Counties, with a total area of 24,024 acres (9,722 ha). It was established in 1876 and was named for the village of Toro and the Martinez Indian Agency. In 1905 as the Colorado River flowed into the area, most of the tribe packed their belongings and headed into the mountains as they were familiar with the reoccurring lake from their legends. Nearly half of the reservation was eventually flooded by the formation of the Salton Sea. Following the flooding, in 1909, 3,000 new unflooded acres were added to the reservation. In 1970, 42 of the 217 enrolled tribal members lived on the reservation. As of the 2010 census the population was 5,594.

== Government ==
The tribe's headquarters is located in Thermal, California. Their tribal administration as of January 2023 is as follows:

- Tribal Chairman Joseph Mirelez
- Vice-chairman RoseMarie Morreo
- Secretary Tina Jimenez
- Treasurer Elena Loya
- Council Member Desiree Franco
- Council Member Gary Resvaloso
- Council Member Proxy Lupe Sanchez

== Demographics ==
=== 2020 census ===
Torres-Martinez Reservation, California – Racial and ethnic composition Note: the US Census treats Hispanic/Latino as an ethnic category. This table excludes Latinos from the racial categories and assigns them to a separate category. Hispanics/Latinos may be of any race.
Race / Ethnicity (NH = Non-Hispanic)	Pop 2000	Pop 2010	Pop 2020	% 2000	% 2010	% 2020
White alone (NH)	111	89	45	2.68%	1.59%	1.30%
Black or African American alone (NH)	7	4	5	0.17%	0.07%	0.14%
Native American or Alaska Native alone (NH)	152	109	140	3.67%	1.95%	4.05%
Asian alone (NH)	37	20	22	0.89%	0.36%	0.64%
Native Hawaiian or Pacific Islander alone (NH)	2	0	0	0.05%	0.00%	0.00%
Other race alone (NH)	0	0	28	0.00%	0.00%	0.81%
Mixed race or Multiracial (NH)	16	13	29	0.39%	0.23%	0.84%
Hispanic or Latino (any race)	3,821	5,359	3,185	92.16%	95.80%	92.21%
Total	4,146	5,594	3,454	100.00%	100.00%	100.00%

== Economic development ==
The tribe owns and operates the Red Earth Casino in Salton City, California.

== Cemetery ==
The tribe maintains a small (48 interments) cemetery on Martinez Road in Thermal.

== Notable tribal citizens ==
- Ruby Modesto (1913–1980), medicine woman, traditionalist, educator

== See also ==
- Mission Indians
