= Chuckwalla National Monument =

California protected area

- IUCN category V (protected landscape/seascape)
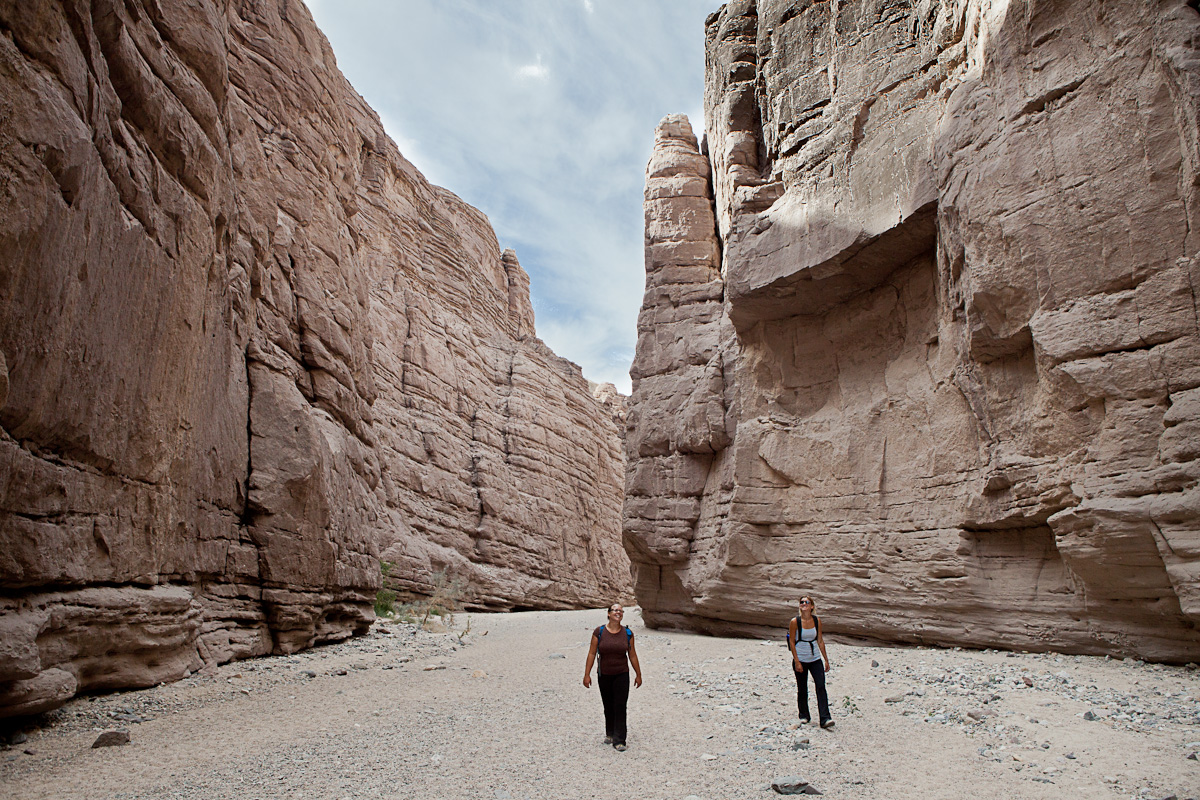
- Mecca Hills, part of the Chuckwalla National Monument

- Location within southern California Location within California Location within the United States
- Interactive map of Chuckwalla National Monument
- Location: Eastern Riverside County, California, United States
- Nearest city: Mecca, California; Desert Center, California
- Coordinates: 33°36′N 115°18′W
- Area: 624,270 acres (252,630 ha)
- Established: January 14, 2025; 22 months ago
- Governing body: Bureau of Land Management
- Website: https://www.blm.gov/programs/national-conservation-lands/california/chuckwalla

Chuckwalla National Monument is a national monument in the Colorado Desert of Southern California that protects 624,270 acres (2,526.3 km^{2}; 252,630 ha) of desert habitat in Riverside and Imperial counties from development. The monument spans several mountain ranges between Joshua Tree National Park and the Chocolate Mountain Aerial Gunnery Range.

President Joe Biden established the monument by proclamation under the Antiquities Act on January 14, 2025. The proclamation includes co-management by a commission established by five local tribes.

== Features ==
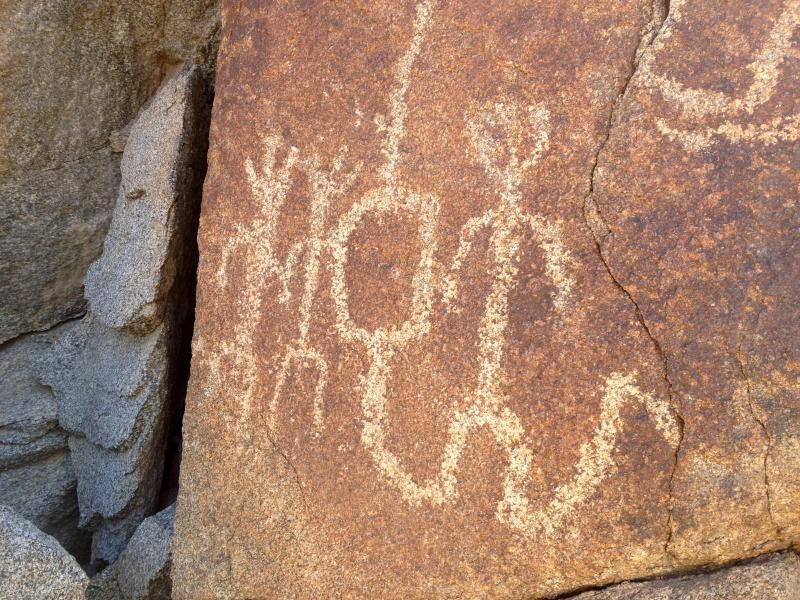
Petroglyphs at Corn Springs.

The monument is named after the chuckwalla lizards native to the area. Other local wildlife include Desert bighorn sheep and Desert tortoise. Some of the areas that would be absorbed into the monument include the already protected Mecca Hills, Orocopia Mountains, Chuckwalla Mountains, Little Chuckwalla Mountains, Palo Verde Mountains, and Milpitas Wash wilderness areas. Existing outdoor recreational and historical sites that would become part of the monument include Corn Springs, the Eagle Mountain Railroad, various training sites dating from World War II, and already existing hiking trails.

The Bradshaw Trail, a historic 1860s stagecoach route and BLM Back Country Byway, runs through the monument.

== History ==
Calls for land protection in the area have come from a variety of sources, including the Cahuilla, Chemehuevi, Mohave, Quechan, and Serrano tribes, who together propose that Joe Biden create the monument under the powers of the Antiquities Act.

In September 2023, Congressman Raul Ruiz introduced federal legislation to create the monument, with support from California senators Alex Padilla and Laphonza Butler. The act would also expand the adjacent Joshua Tree National Park by roughly 17,000 acres, and split management of the monument between the Bureau of Land Management and the local Cahuilla Indian tribe.

The nearby Yuma tribe have also sought to protect nearly 400,000 acres (160,000 ha) as the Kw'tsán National Monument. Additionally, the monument designation was supported by Audubon, California Native Plant Society, Center for Biological Diversity, Sierra Club, and others. The land that constitutes the monument is all owned and managed by the federal government, and would be set aside to protect the existing environment from expanding suburban development and solar and wind energy projects. In an agreement with renewable energy companies, the original proposal was reduced by 40,000 acres (16,000 ha) to maintain access to transmission lines for solar development.

President Joe Biden established the monument by proclamation under the Antiquities Act on January 14, 2025.

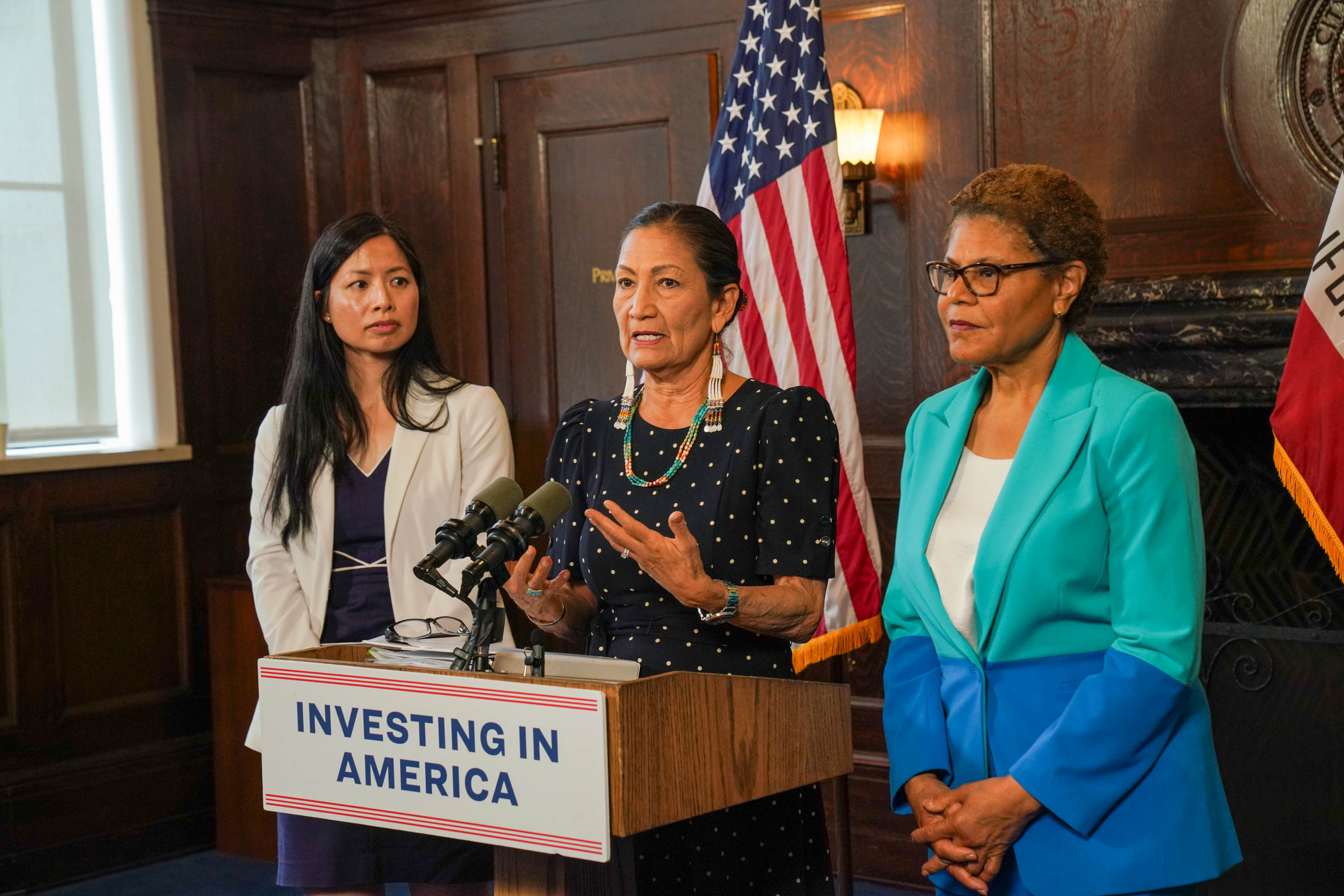
Deb Haaland advocating for the national monument in May 2024.

Secretary of the Interior Deb Haaland visited the area in May 2024. The California legislature unanimously passed a resolution in support of the monument.

On January 2, 2025, the Washington Post reported that President Biden would establish Chuckwalla National Monument along with Sáttítla Highlands National Monument. Biden planned to do so at an event in the Coachella Valley on January 7, but it was canceled due to a Santa Ana windstorm and rescheduled to be at the White House on January 14. The proclamation calls for co-stewardship and management of the monument with Tribal Nations.

With the monument's establishment, the White House announced the Moab to Mojave Conservation Corridor, a 600-mile (970 km) continuous network of protected areas spanning California, Nevada, Arizona, and Utah.

On March 15, 2025, President Donald Trump signaled that he would rescind the creation of the Chuckwalla National Monument and Sáttítla Highlands National Monument, saying that they "lock up vast amounts of land from economic development and energy production", but no executive order was released. There is no legal authority for undoing establishment of a national monument. In April, The Washington Post reported that the Department of the Interior was considering reducing the size of the monument, along with five others.

On May 1, 2025, Austin-based Texas Public Policy Foundation filed a complaint on behalf of a mining claim holder from Michigan, seeking to eliminate the national monument designation.

On October 15, 2025, five tribal nations, the Fort Yuma Indian Reservation, Torres Martinez Desert Cahuilla Indians, Cahuilla Band of Indians, Chemehuevi Indian Tribe of the Chemehuevi Reservation, and the Colorado River Indian Tribes - formed the Chuckwalla National Monument Intertribal Commission to play a central role in planning and management of the monument.

== Gallery ==
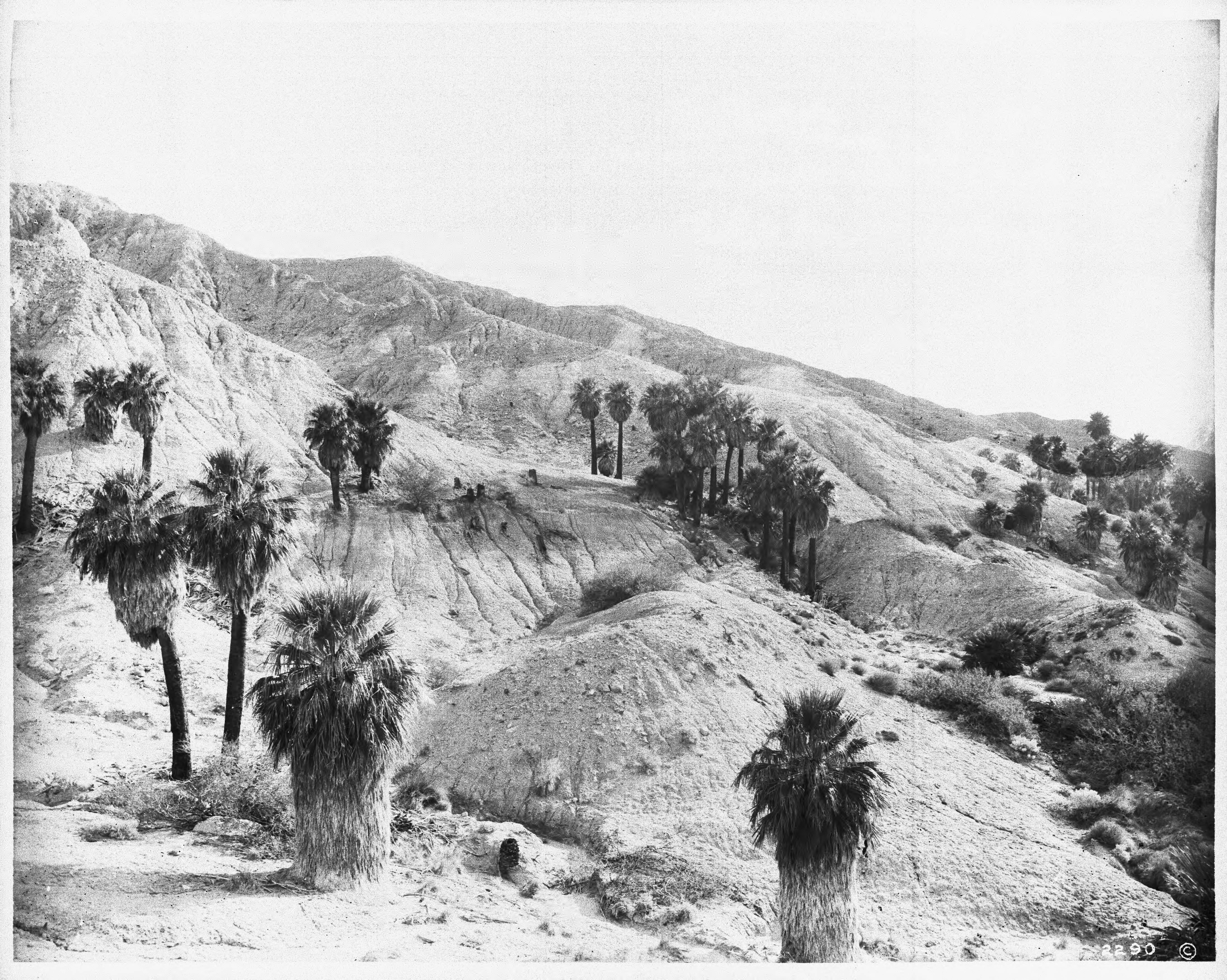
Chuckwalla Canyon, 1904

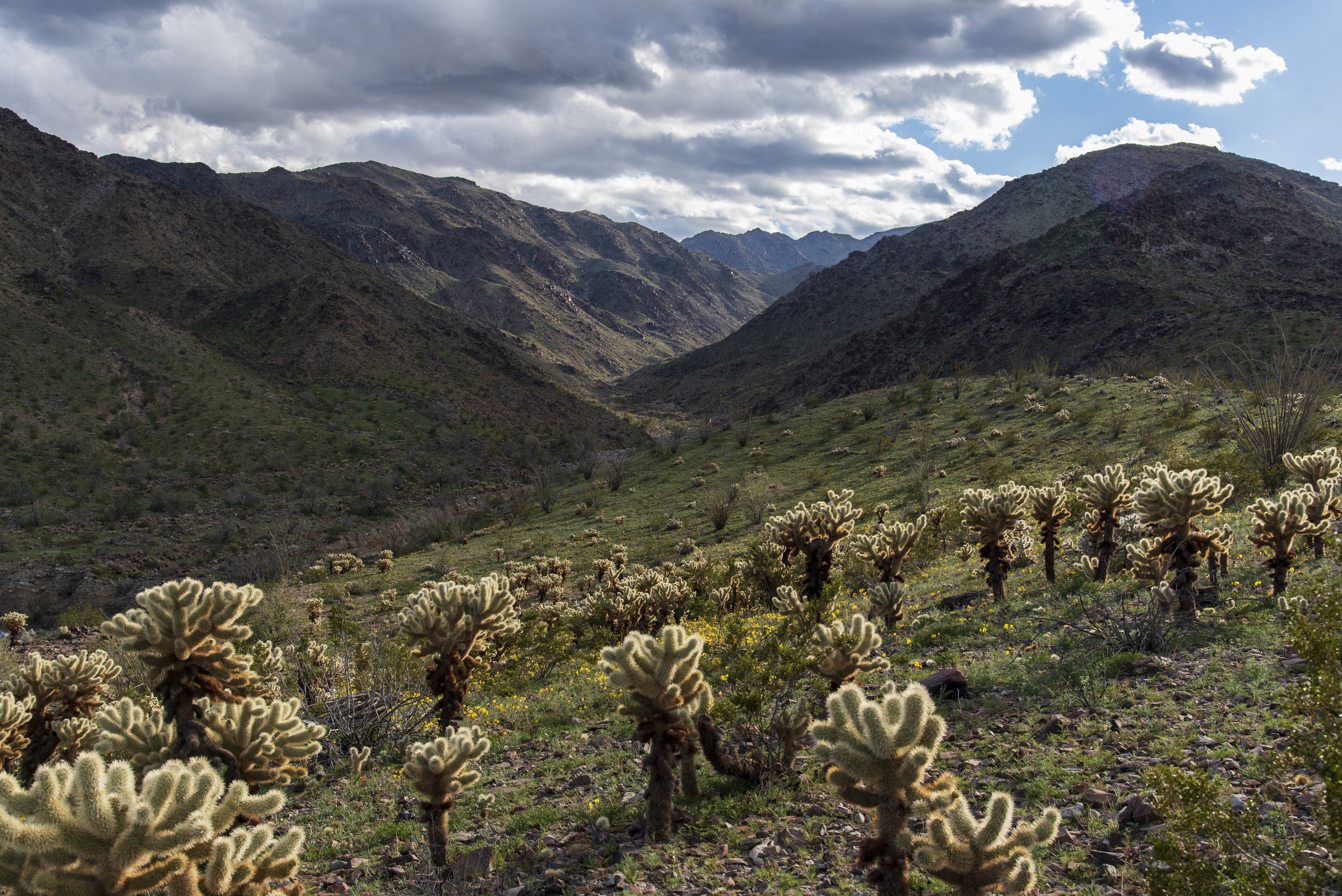
Corn Springs Campground

== See also ==
- List of national monuments of the United States

== Bibliography ==
- "White House establishment proclamation". January 14, 2025.
