= Buried Mountain =

Mountain in California, United States

- Location within California

Highest point
- Elevation: 1,472 ft (449 m)
- Prominence: 152 ft (46 m)
- Coordinates: 33°38′58″N 115°51′25″W

Geography
- Location: Riverside County, California, U.S.
- Parent range: Orocopia Mountains
- Topo map: USGS Cottonwood Spring

Climbing
- Easiest route: Scramble

Buried Mountain is a mountain in the Orocopia Mountains, visible from Interstate 10. The mountain, which is visually isolated, gains its name due to its appearance of being "buried" into the ground, as it is 500 feet shorter than the rest of the Orocopia Mountains lying in the background.

== Geography ==
The mountain sits between Interstate 10 and Box Canyon Road, the old alignment of California State Route 195. The land is owned by the Bureau of Land Management, and the surrounding wash is occasionally used as a campsite and staging area for utility companies and youth groups. Immediately to the north of the mountain is the Buried Mountain Wash, which can be accessed through a dirt road, originally routed in the 1930s for utility purposes. To the south is the Box Canyon Wash, through which Box Canyon Road traverses. Box Canyon Wash travels through the eponymous Box Canyon of the nearby Mecca Hills, a popular area for geology instruction.

A series of wells were present at Buried Mountain, which supplied water for the Metropolitan Water District of Southern California. A transmission line runs to the south of the mountain.

== Geology ==
The summit consists primarily of aplitic Mesozoic granite, younger than the Orocopia schist that it overlies. The base of the mountain is cut by a large fault, creating a significant non-conformity between the steep slopes of the mountain and lower shallow reaches, which are conglomerates and breccias of the Eocene Maniobra Formation.
