= Asperity (faults) =

An asperity is an area on an active fault where there is increased friction, such that the fault may become locked, rather than continuously slipping as in aseismic creep. Earthquake rupture generally begins with the failure of an asperity, allowing the fault to move.

== See also ==
- Asperity (materials science)
- Asperity (geotechnical engineering)
- Earthquake
- Fault friction
- Fault mechanics
