= Fault (geology) =

Fracture or discontinuity in displaced rock

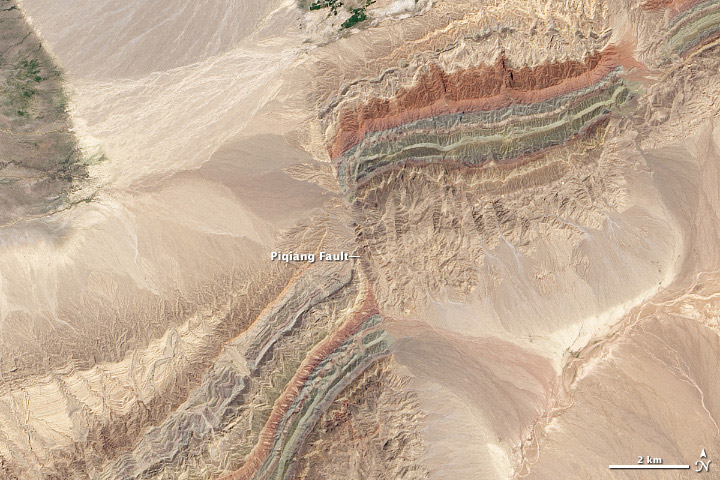
Satellite image of a fault in the Taklamakan Desert. The two colorful ridges (at bottom left and top right) used to form a single continuous line, but have been split apart by movement along the fault.

In geology, a fault is a planar fracture or discontinuity in a volume of rock across which there has been significant displacement as a result of rock-mass movements. Large faults within Earth's crust result from the action of plate tectonic forces, with the largest forming the boundaries between the plates, such as the megathrust faults of subduction zones or transform faults. Energy release associated with rapid movement on active faults is the cause of most earthquakes. Faults may also displace slowly, by aseismic creep.

A fault plane is the plane that represents the fracture surface of a fault. A fault trace or fault line is a place where the fault can be seen or mapped on the surface. A fault trace is also the line commonly plotted on geological maps to represent a fault.

A fault zone is a cluster of parallel faults. However, the term is also used for the zone of crushed rock along a single fault. Prolonged motion along closely spaced faults can blur the distinction, as the rock between the faults is converted to fault-bound lenses of rock and then progressively crushed.

== Mechanisms of faulting ==
Due to friction and the rigidity of the constituent rocks, the two sides of a fault cannot always glide or flow past each other easily, and so occasionally all movement stops. The regions of higher friction along a fault plane, where it becomes locked, are called asperities. Stress builds up when a fault is locked, and when it reaches a level that exceeds the strength threshold, the fault ruptures and the accumulated strain energy is released in part as seismic waves, forming an earthquake.

Strain occurs accumulatively or instantaneously, depending on the liquid state of the rock; the ductile lower crust and mantle accumulate deformation gradually via shearing, whereas the brittle upper crust reacts by fracture – instantaneous stress release – resulting in motion along the fault. A fault in ductile rocks can also release instantaneously when the strain rate is too great.

== Slip, heave, throw ==
Slip is the relative motion of geological features present on either side of a fault plane, typically quantified in terms of a separation or displacement (a vector quantity). A fault's sense of slip is defined as the relative motion of the rock on each side of the fault concerning the other side. In measuring the vertical and horizontal components, the throw of the fault is the vertical displacement and the heave of the fault is the horizontal component of the separation, as in "throw up and heave out".

The vector of slip can be qualitatively assessed by studying any drag folding of strata, which may be visible on either side of the fault. Drag folding is a zone of folding close to a fault that likely arises from frictional resistance to movement on the fault. The direction and magnitude of heave and throw can be measured only by finding common intersection points on either side of the fault (called a piercing point). In practice, it is usually only possible to find the slip direction of faults, and an approximation of the heave and throw vector.

== Hanging wall and footwall ==
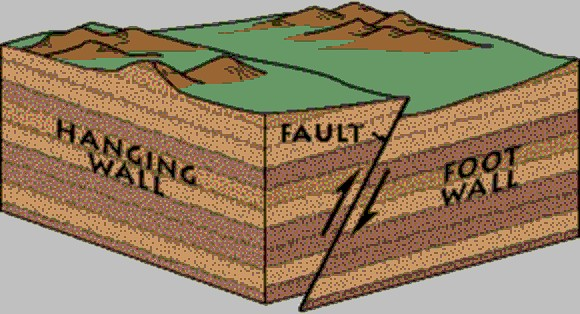
Hanging wall and footwall

The two sides of a non-vertical fault are known as the hanging wall and footwall. The hanging wall occurs above the fault plane and the footwall occurs below it. This terminology comes from mining: when working a tabular ore body, the miner stood with the footwall under his feet and with the hanging wall above him. These terms are important for distinguishing different dip-slip fault types: reverse faults and normal faults. In a reverse fault, the hanging wall displaces upward, while in a normal fault the hanging wall displaces downward. Distinguishing between these two fault types is important for determining the stress regime of the fault movement.

The problem of the hanging wall can lead to severe stresses and rock bursts, for example at Frood Mine.

== Fault types ==
Faults are mainly classified in terms of the angle that the fault plane makes with the Earth's surface, known as the dip, and the direction of slip along the fault plane. Based on the direction of slip, faults can be categorized as:

- strike-slip, where the offset is predominantly horizontal, parallel to the fault trace;
- dip-slip, offset is predominantly vertical and/or perpendicular to the fault trace; or
- oblique-slip, combining strike-slip and dip-slip.

=== Strike-slip faults ===
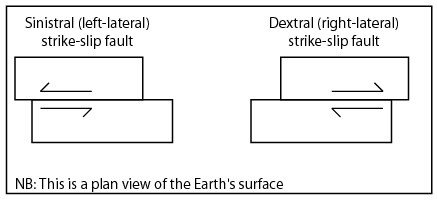
Schematic illustration of the two strike-slip fault types, as seen from above

In a strike-slip fault (also known as a wrench fault, tear fault or transcurrent fault), the fault surface (plane) is usually near vertical, and the footwall moves laterally either left or right with very little vertical motion. Strike-slip faults with left-lateral motion are also known as sinistral faults and those with right-lateral motion as dextral faults. Each is defined by the direction of movement of the ground as would be seen by an observer on the opposite side of the fault.

A special class of strike-slip fault is the transform fault when it forms a plate boundary. This class is related to an offset in a spreading center, such as a mid-ocean ridge, or, less common, within continental lithosphere, such as the Dead Sea Transform in the Middle East or the Alpine Fault in New Zealand. Transform faults are also referred to as "conservative" plate boundaries since the lithosphere is neither created nor destroyed.

=== Dip-slip faults ===
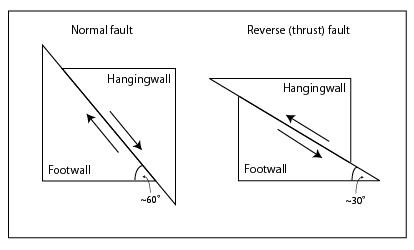
Vertical cross-sectional view, along a plane perpendicular to the fault plane, illustrating normal and reverse dip-slip faults

Dip-slip faults can be either normal ("extensional") or reverse. The terminology of "normal" and "reverse" comes from coal mining in England, where normal faults are the most common.

With the passage of time, a regional reversal between tensional and compressional stresses (or vice-versa) might occur, and faults may be reactivated with their relative block movement inverted in opposite directions to the original movement (fault inversion). In such a way, a normal fault may therefore become a reverse fault and vice versa.

==== Normal faults ====
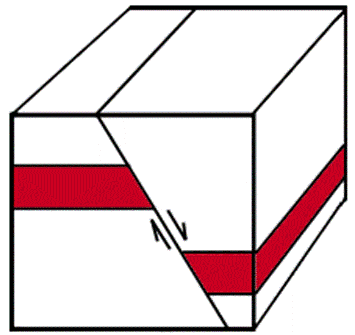
Normal fault diagram

In a normal fault, the hanging wall moves downward, relative to the footwall. The dip of most normal faults is at least 60 degrees but some normal faults dip at less than 45 degrees.

===== Basin and range topography =====
Diagram illustrating the structural relationship between grabens and horsts.

A downthrown block between two normal faults dipping towards each other is a graben. A block stranded between two grabens, and therefore two normal faults dipping away from each other, is a horst. A sequence of grabens and horsts on the surface of the Earth produces a characteristic basin and range topography.

===== Listric faults =====
A listric fault is a type of normal fault that has a concave-upward shape with the upper section near Earth's surface being steeper, becoming more horizontal with increased depth. Normal faults can evolve into listric faults with the fault plane curving into the Earth. They can also form where the hanging wall is absent (such as on a cliff), where the footwall may slump in a manner that creates multiple listric faults.

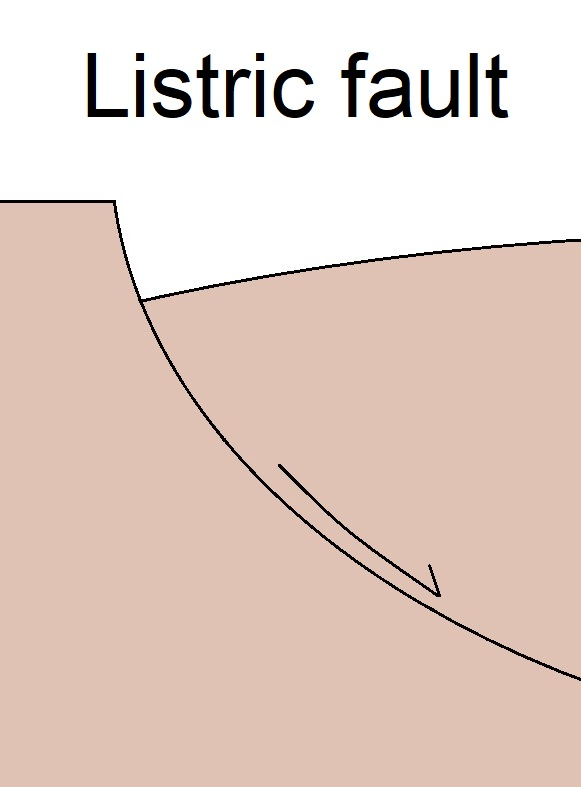
Cross-section diagram of a listric fault

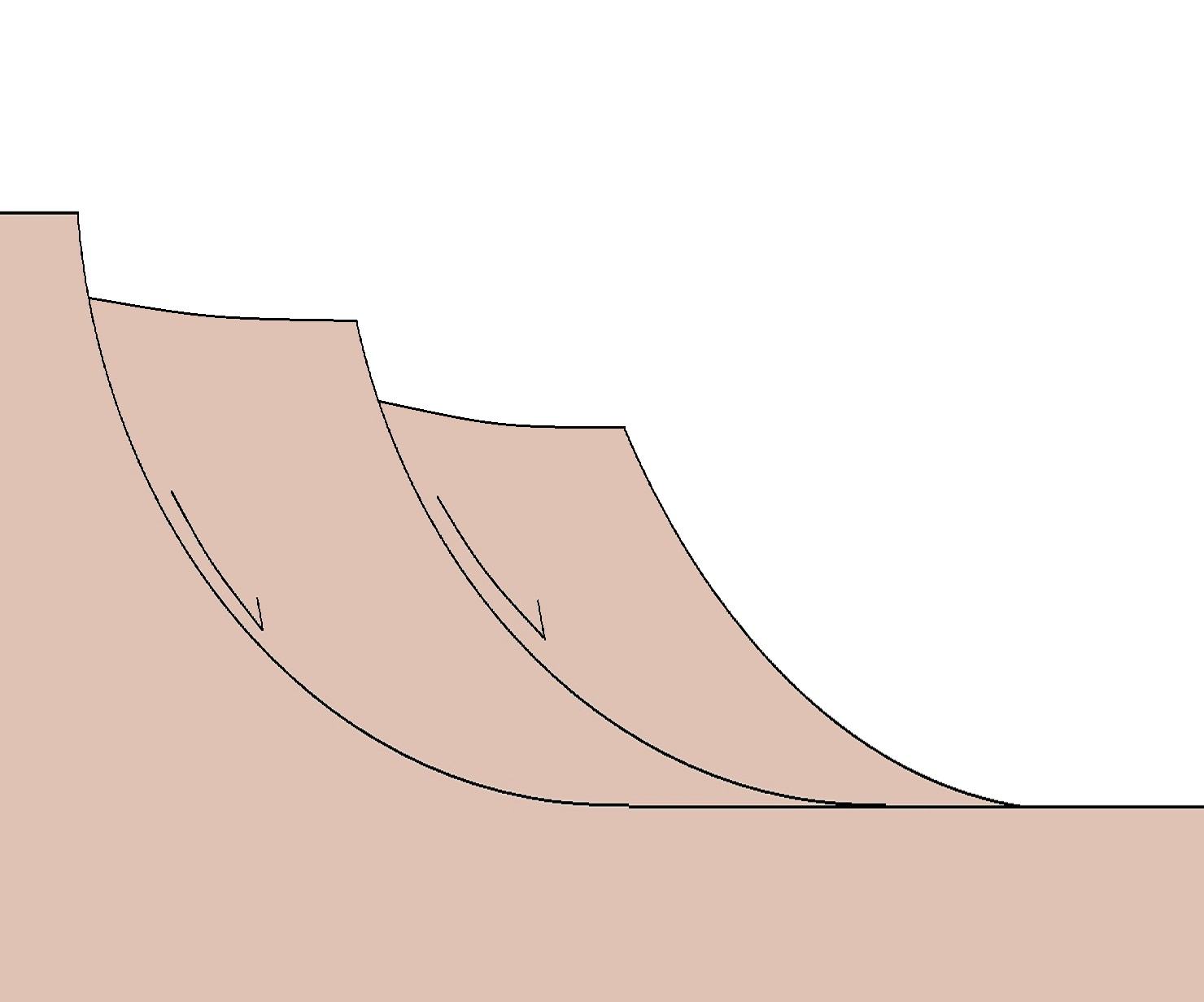
Cross-section diagram of multiple listric faults in a cliff wall

===== Detachment faults =====
The fault planes of listric faults can further flatten and evolve into a horizontal or near-horizontal plane, where slip progresses horizontally along a decollement. Extensional decollements can grow to great dimensions and form detachment faults, which are low-angle normal faults with regional tectonic significance.

Due to the curvature of the fault plane, the horizontal extensional displacement on a listric fault implies a geometric "gap" between the hanging and footwalls of the fault forms when the slip motion occurs. To accommodate into the geometric gap, and depending on its rheology, the hanging wall might fold and slide downwards into the gap and produce rollover folding, or break into further faults and blocks which fill in the gap. If faults form, imbrication fans or domino faulting may form.

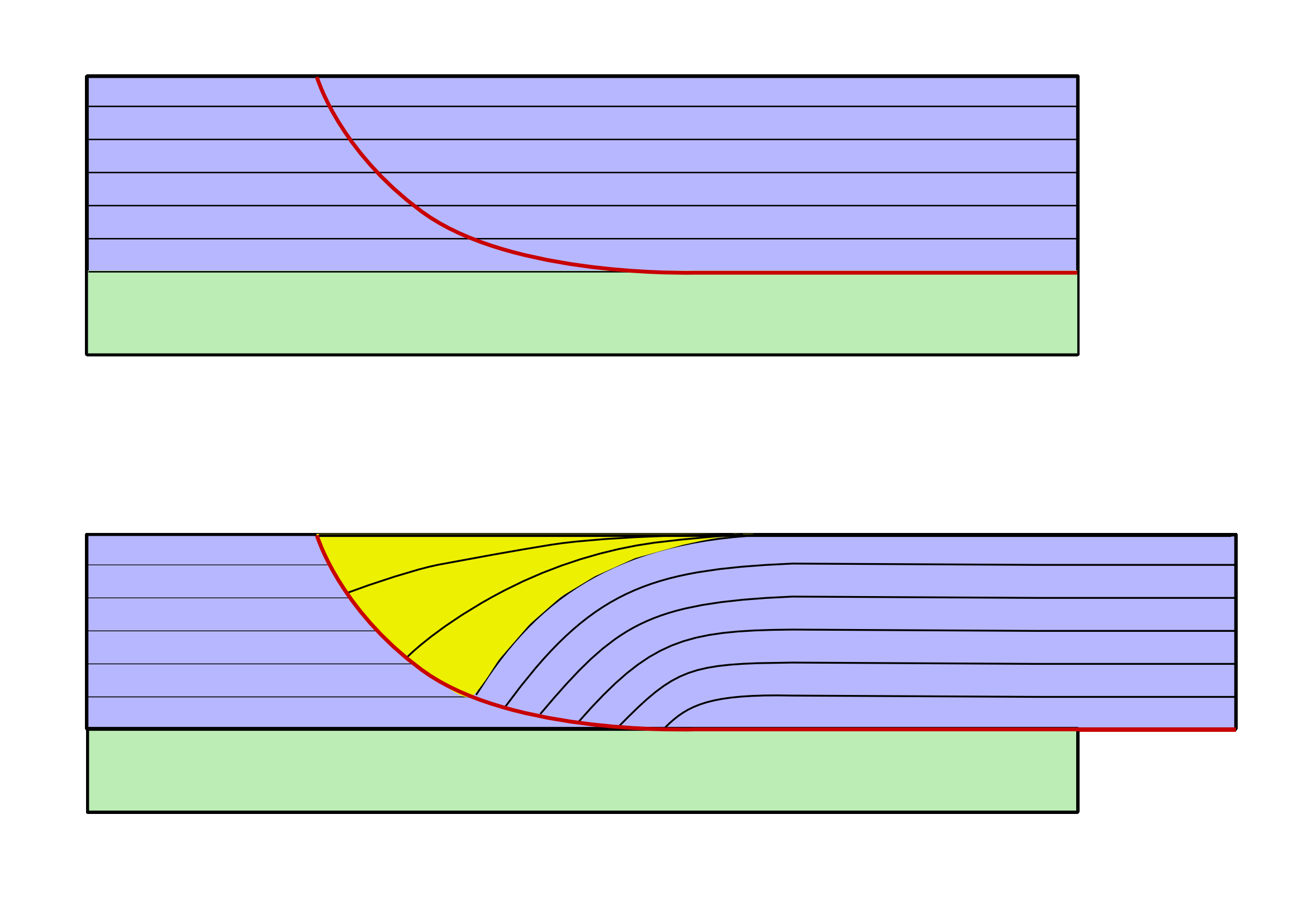
Cross-section diagram of a listric fault (red line), with a resulting rollover fold

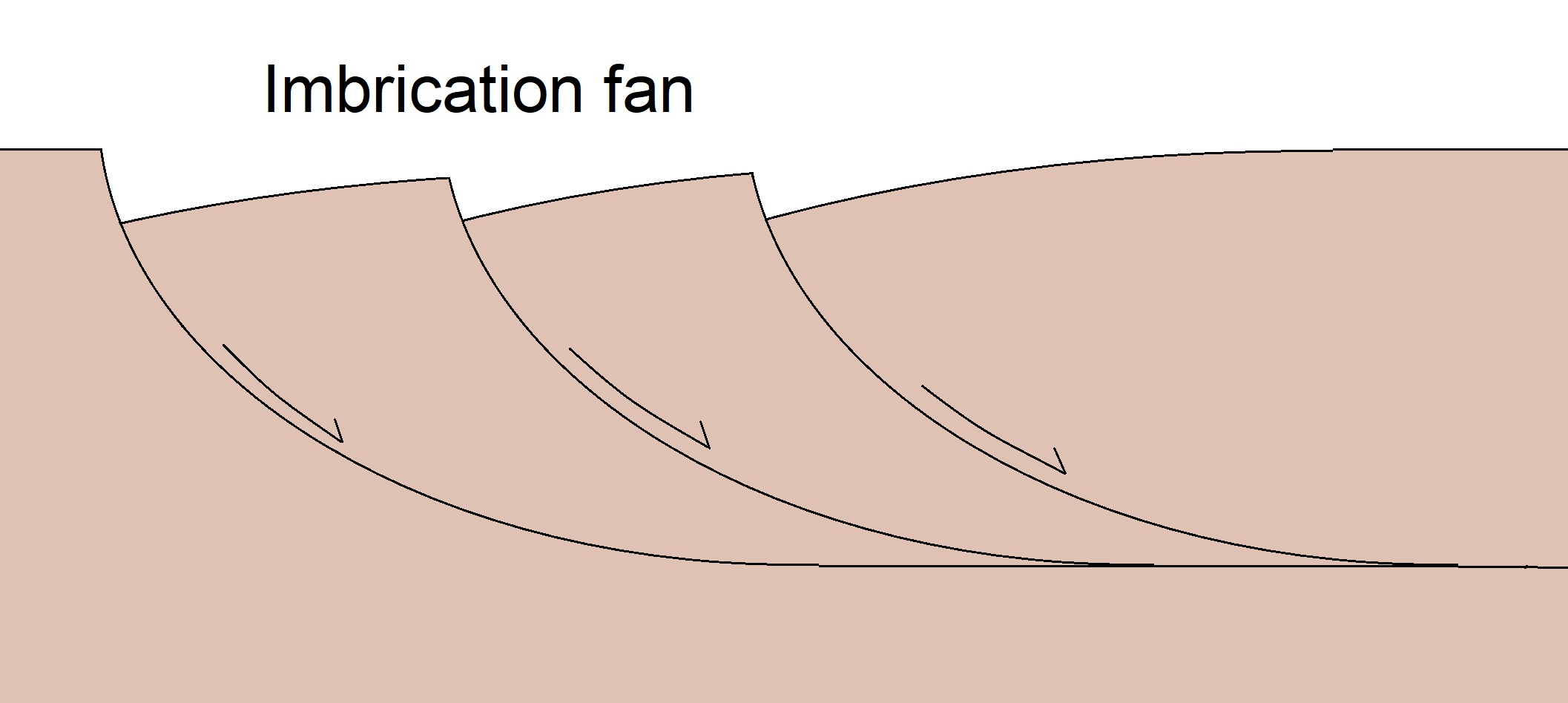
Cross-section diagram showing how an imbrication fan forms

==== Reverse faults ====
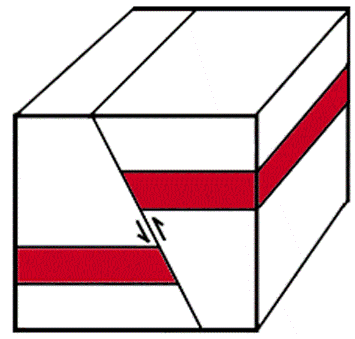
Reverse fault

A reverse fault is the opposite of a normal fault—the hanging wall moves up relative to the footwall.
Reverse faults indicate compressive shortening of the crust.

===== Thrust faults =====
Cross-section diagram of a thrust fault with a fault-bend fold

A thrust fault has the same sense of motion as a reverse fault, but with the dip of the fault plane at less than 45°. Thrust faults typically form ramps, flats and fault-bend (hanging wall and footwall) folds.

A section of a hanging wall or foot wall where a thrust fault formed along a relatively weak bedding plane is known as a flat and a section where the thrust fault cut upward through the stratigraphic sequence is known as a ramp. Typically, thrust faults move within formations by forming flats and climbing up sections with ramps. This results in the hanging wall flat (or a portion thereof) lying atop the foot wall ramp as shown in the fault-bend fold diagram.

Thrust faults form nappes and klippen in the large thrust belts. Subduction zones are a special class of thrusts that form the largest faults on Earth and give rise to the largest earthquakes.

=== Oblique-slip faults ===
Oblique-slip fault

See oblique-slip fault.

=== Ring fault ===
Ring faults, also known as caldera faults, are faults that occur within collapsed volcanic calderas and the sites of bolide strikes, such as the Chesapeake Bay impact crater. Ring faults are the result of a series of overlapping normal faults, forming a circular outline. Fractures created by ring faults may be filled by ring dikes.

=== Synthetic and antithetic faults ===
Synthetic and antithetic are terms used to describe minor faults associated with a major fault. Synthetic faults dip in the same direction as the major fault while the antithetic faults dip in the opposite direction. These faults may be accompanied by rollover anticlines (e.g. the Niger Delta structural style).

== Fault rock ==
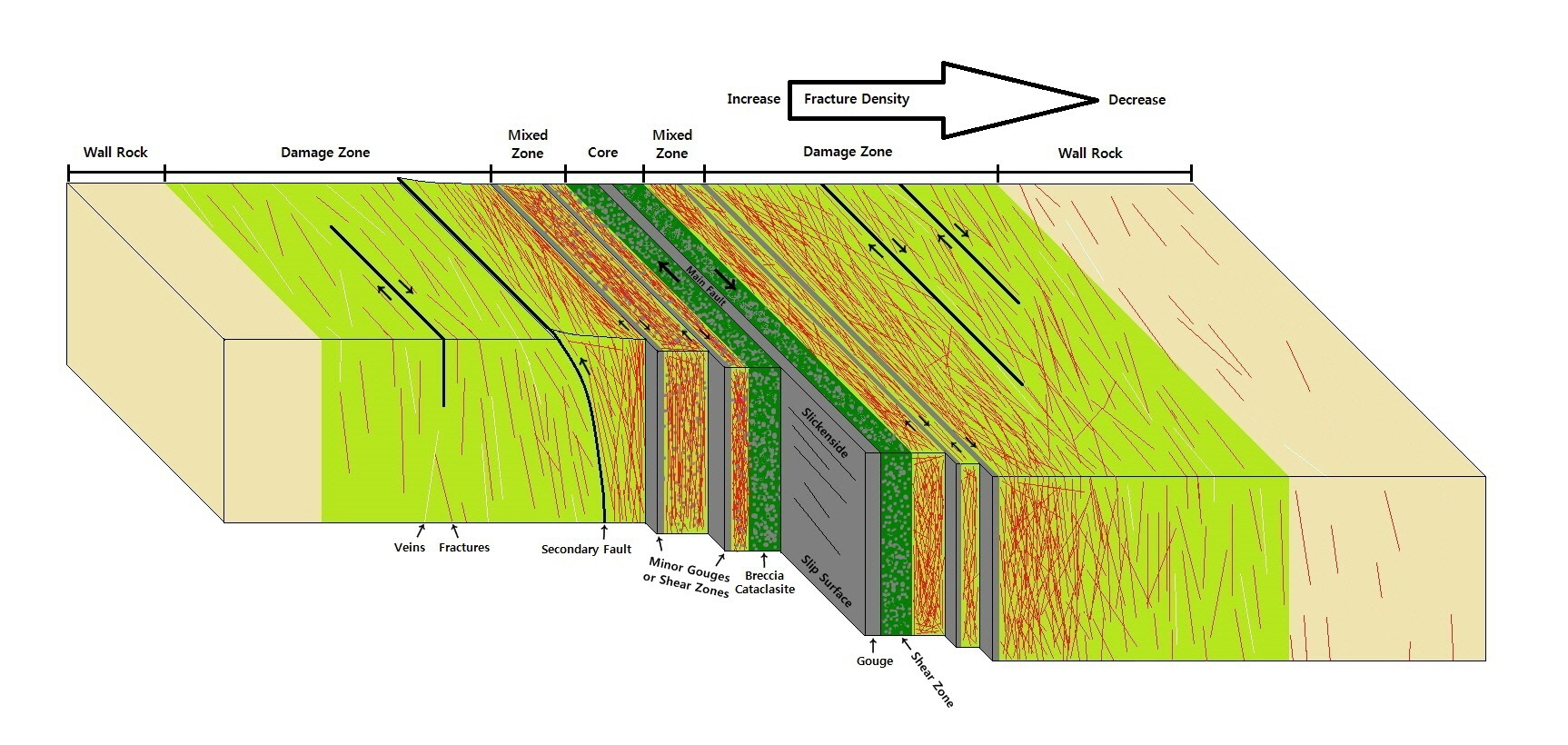
Structure of a fault

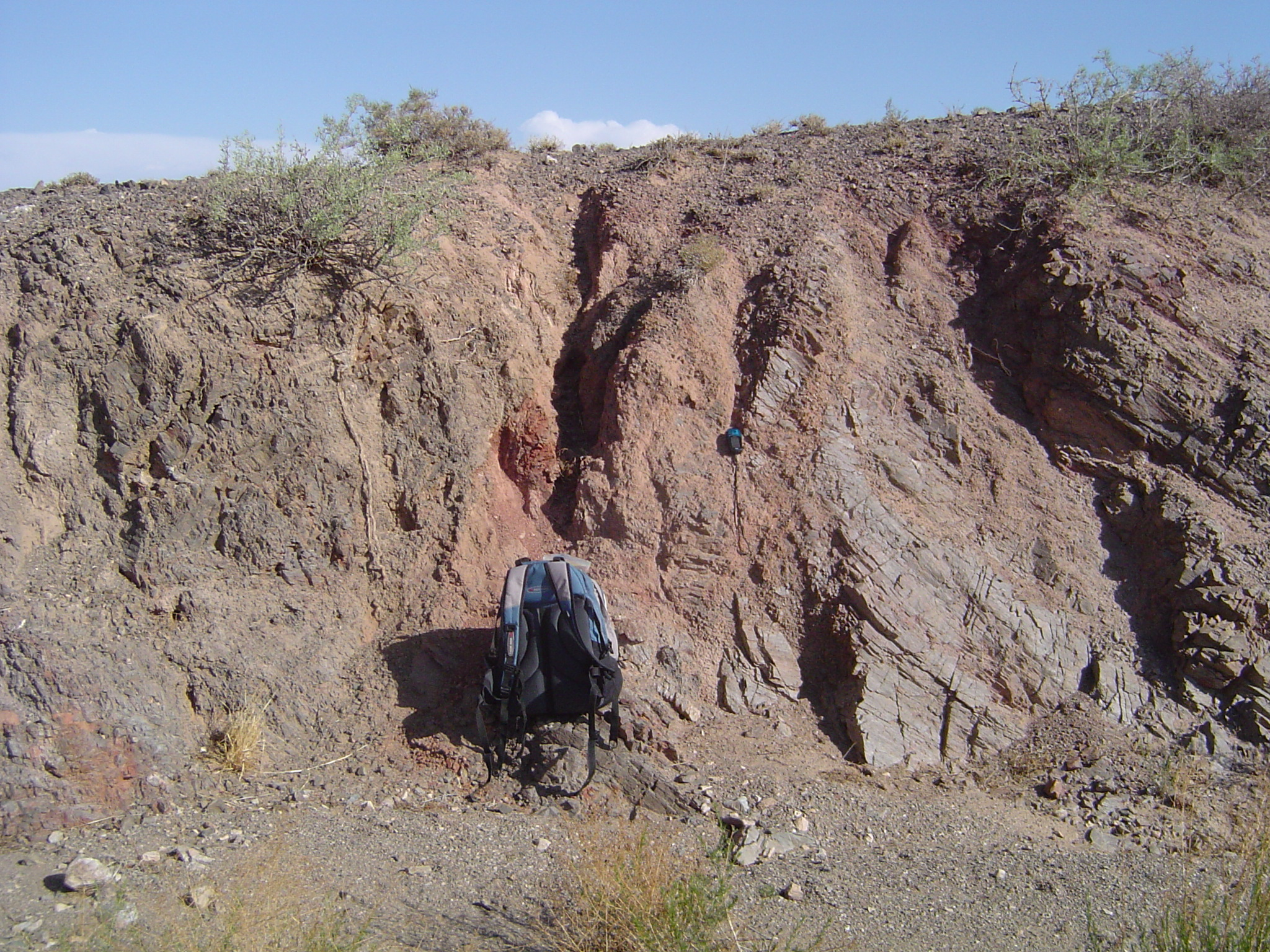
Salmon-colored fault gouge and associated fault separates two different rock types on the left (dark gray) and right (light gray). From the Gobi of Mongolia.

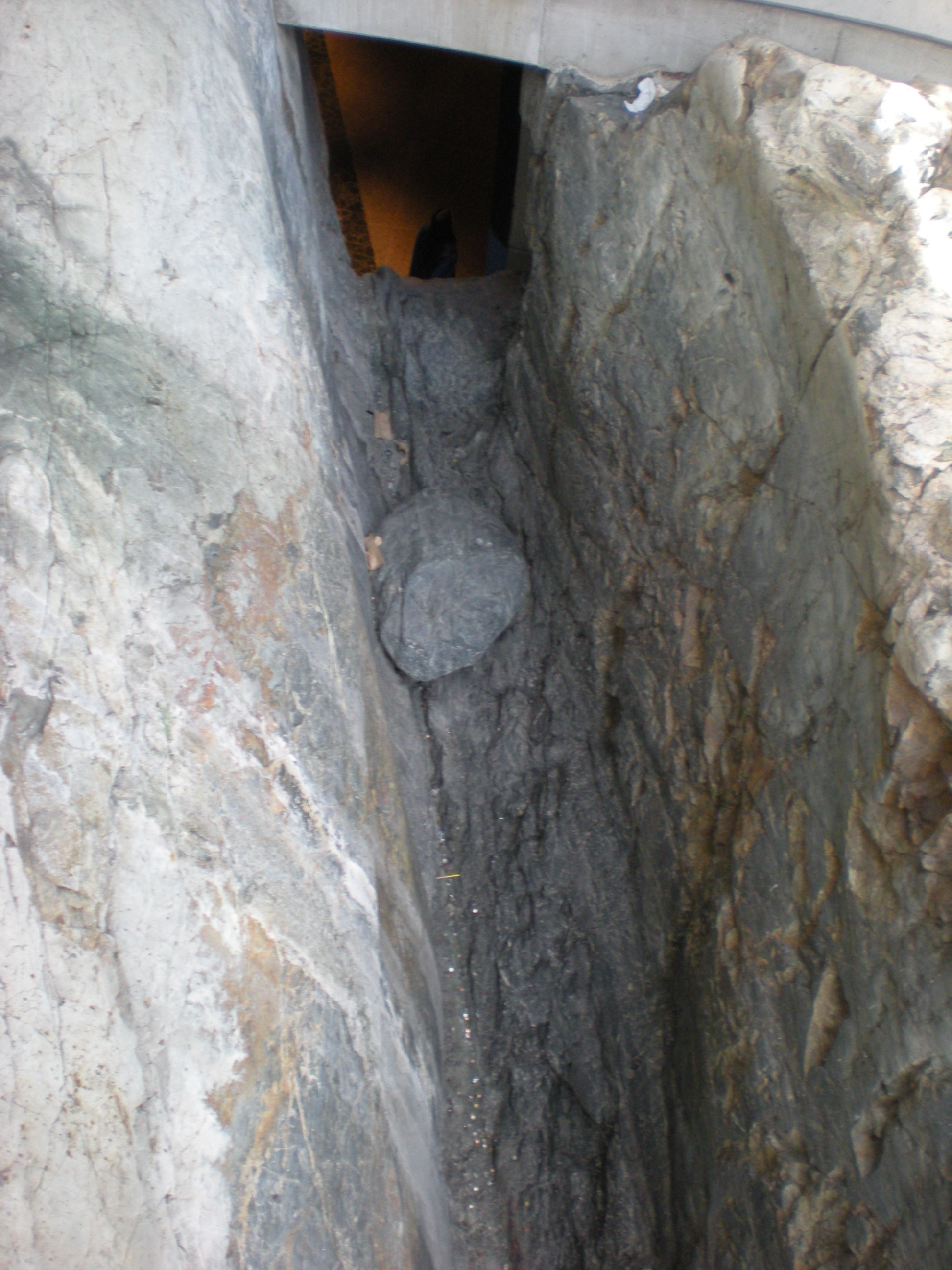
Inactive fault from Sudbury to Sault Ste. Marie, Northern Ontario, Canada

All faults have a measurable thickness, made up of deformed rock characteristic of the level in the crust where the faulting happened, of the rock types affected by the fault and of the presence and nature of any mineralising fluids. Fault rocks are classified by their textures and the implied mechanism of deformation. A fault that passes through different levels of the lithosphere will have many different types of fault rock developed along its surface. Continued dip-slip displacement tends to juxtapose fault rocks characteristic of different crustal levels, with varying degrees of overprinting. This effect is particularly clear in the case of detachment faults and major thrust faults.

The main types of fault rock include:

- Cataclasite – a fault rock which is cohesive with a poorly developed or absent planar fabric, or which is incohesive, characterised by generally angular clasts and rock fragments in a finer-grained matrix of similar composition.
  - Tectonic or fault breccia – a medium- to coarse-grained cataclasite containing >30% visible fragments.
  - Fault gouge – an incohesive, clay-rich fine- to ultrafine-grained cataclasite, which may possess a planar fabric and containing <30% visible fragments. Rock clasts may be present
    - Clay smear – clay-rich fault gouge formed in sedimentary sequences containing clay-rich layers which are strongly deformed and sheared into the fault gouge.
- Mylonite – a fault rock which is cohesive and characterized by a well-developed planar fabric resulting from tectonic reduction of grain size, and commonly containing rounded porphyroclasts and rock fragments of similar composition to minerals in the matrix
- Pseudotachylyte – ultrafine-grained glassy-looking material, usually black and flinty in appearance, occurring as thin planar veins, injection veins or as a matrix to pseudoconglomerates or breccias, which infills dilation fractures in the host rock. Pseudotachylyte likely only forms as the result of seismic slip rates and can act as a fault rate indicator on inactive faults.

== Impacts on structures and people ==
In geotechnical engineering, a fault often forms a discontinuity that may have a large influence on the mechanical behavior (strength, deformation, etc.) of soil and rock masses in, for example, tunnel, foundation, or slope construction.

The level of a fault's activity can be critical for (1) locating buildings, tanks, and pipelines and (2) assessing the seismic shaking and tsunami hazard to infrastructure and people in the vicinity. In California, for example, new building construction has been prohibited directly on or near faults that have moved within the Holocene Epoch (the last 11,700 years) of the Earth's geological history. Also, faults that have shown movement during the Holocene plus Pleistocene Epochs (the last 2.6 million years) may receive consideration, especially for critical structures such as power plants, dams, hospitals, and schools. Geologists assess a fault's age by studying soil features seen in shallow excavations and geomorphology seen in aerial photographs. Subsurface clues include shears and their relationships to carbonate nodules, eroded clay, and iron oxide mineralization, in the case of older soil, and lack of such signs in the case of younger soil. Radiocarbon dating of organic material buried next to or over a fault shear is often critical in distinguishing active from inactive faults. From such relationships, paleoseismologists can estimate the sizes of past earthquakes over the past several hundred years, and develop rough projections of future fault activity.

== Faults and ore deposits ==
Many ore deposits lie on or are associated with faults. This is because the fractured rock associated with fault zones allow for magma ascent or the circulation of mineral-bearing fluids. Intersections of near-vertical faults are often locations of significant ore deposits.

An example of a fault hosting valuable porphyry copper deposits is northern Chile's Domeyko Fault with deposits at Chuquicamata, Collahuasi, El Abra, El Salvador, La Escondida and Potrerillos. Further south in Chile Los Bronces and El Teniente porphyry copper deposit lie each at the intersection of two fault systems.

Faults may not always act as conduits to surface. It has been proposed that deep-seated "misoriented" faults may instead be zones where magmas forming porphyry copper stagnate achieving the right time for—and type of—igneous differentiation. At a given time differentiated magmas would burst violently out of the fault-traps and head to shallower places in the crust where porphyry copper deposits would be formed.

== Groundwater ==
As faults are zones of weakness, they facilitate the interaction of water with the surrounding rock and enhance chemical weathering. The enhanced chemical weathering increases the size of the weathered zone and hence creates more space for groundwater. Fault zones act as aquifers and also assist groundwater transport.

== Gallery ==
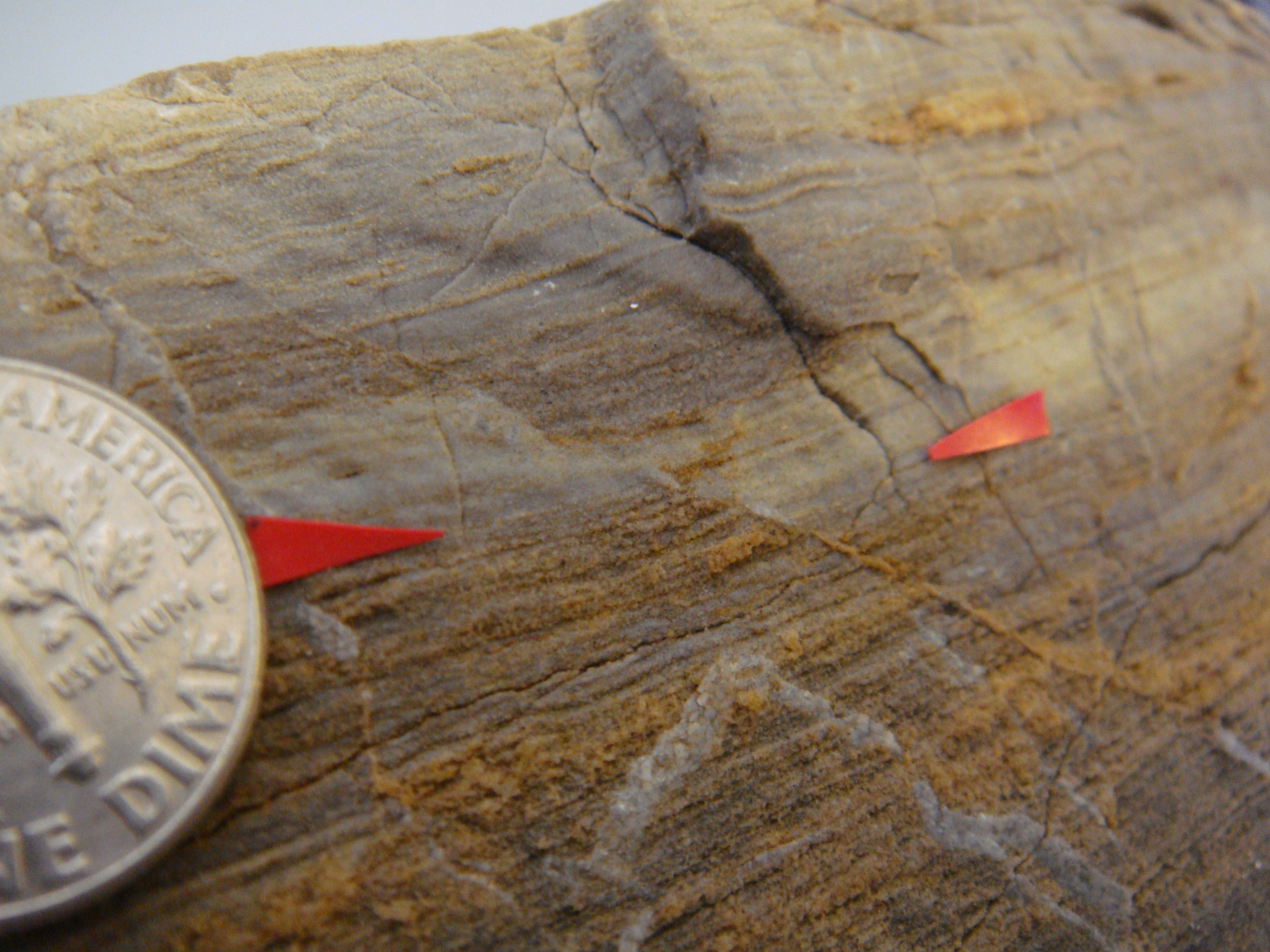
Microfault showing a piercing point (the coin's diameter is 18 mm (0.71 in))

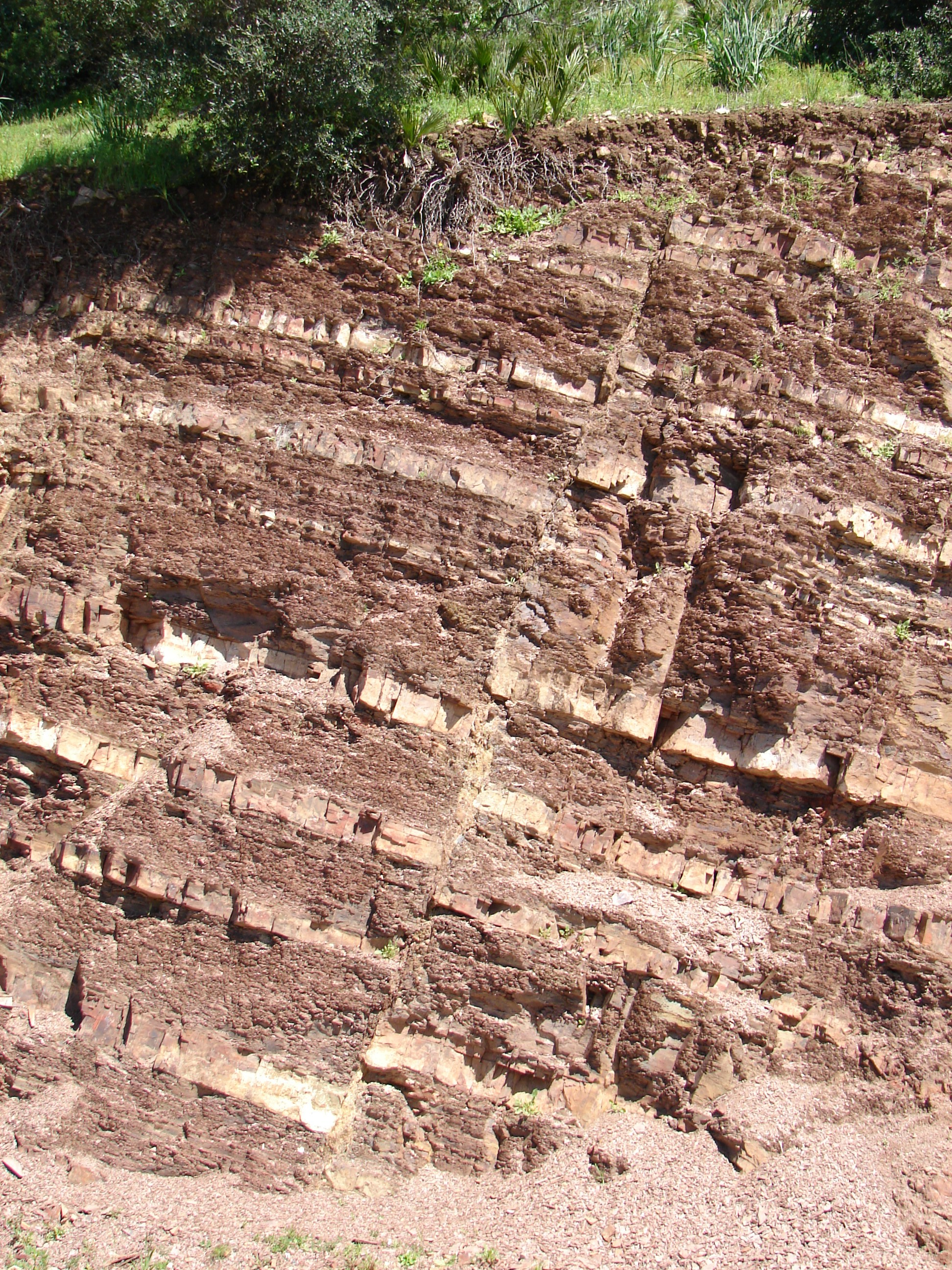
A normal fault in Morocco. The fault plane is the steeply leftward-dipping line in the centre of the photo, which is the plane along which the rock layers to the left have slipped downwards, relative to the layers to the right of the fault.

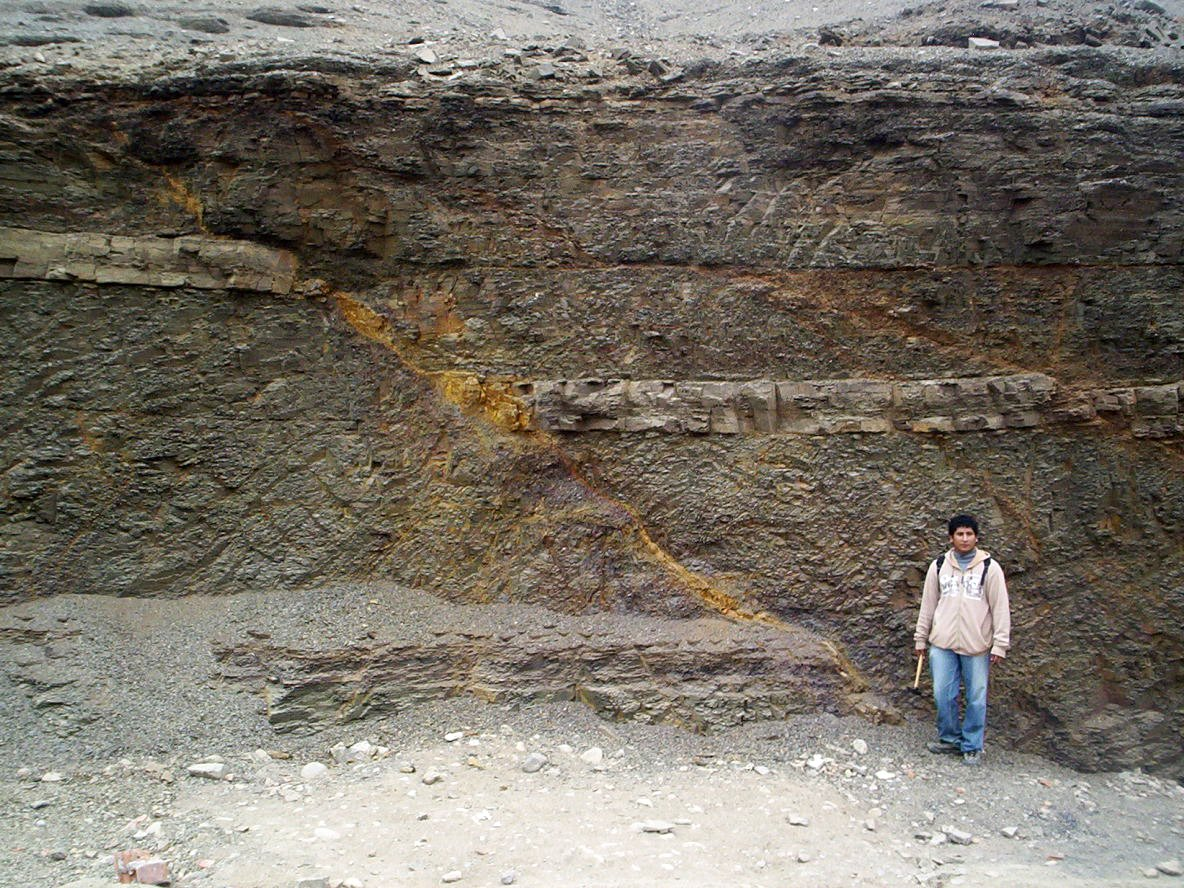
Normal fault with displacement motion from top left to bottom right. La Herradura Formation, Morro Solar, Peru.

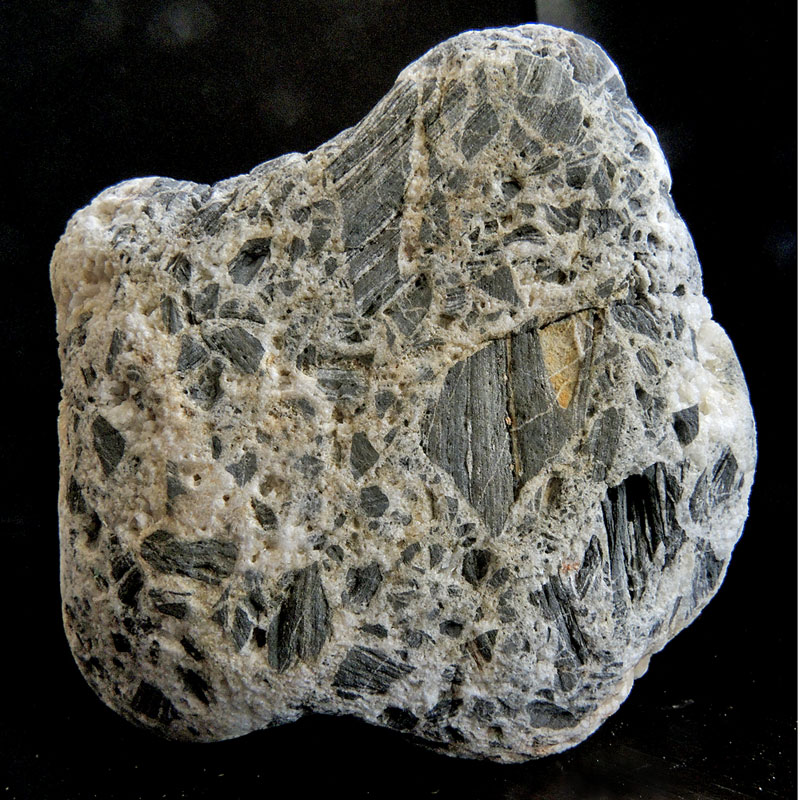
Fault breccia from Spain

== See also ==
- List of fault zones
- Anderson's theory of faulting
- Aseismic creep
- Fault block – Large blocks of rock created by tectonic and localized stresses in Earth's crust
- Fault scarp – Small vertical offset on the ground surface
- Joint – Type of fracture in rock
- Mitigation of seismic motion
- Mountain formation – Geological processes that underlie the formation of mountains
- Orogeny – Formation of mountain ranges
- Paleostress inversion
- Polygonal fault
- Seismic hazard – Earthquake probability in a specific area and time
- Striation – Groove, created by a geological process, on the surface of a rock or a mineral
- Vertical displacement – Vertical movement of Earth's crust

== Other reading ==
- Davis, George H.; Reynolds, Stephen J. (1996). "Folds". Structural Geology of Rocks and Regions (2nd ed.). John Wiley & Sons. pp. 372–424. ISBN 0-471-52621-5.
- Fichter, Lynn S.; Baedke, Steve J. (13 September 2000). "A Primer on Appalachian Structural Geology". James Madison University. Archived from the original on 12 January 2010.
- Hart, E.W.; Bryant, W.A. (1997). Fault rupture hazard in California: Alquist-Priolo earthquake fault zoning act with index to earthquake fault zone maps (Report). Special Publication 42. California Division of Mines and Geology.
- Marquis, John; Hafner, Katrin; Hauksson, Egill, "The Properties of Fault Slip", Investigating Earthquakes through Regional Seismicity, Southern California Earthquake Center, archived from the original on 25 June 2010
- McKnight, Tom L.; Hess, Darrel (2000). "The Internal Processes: Types of Faults". Physical Geography: A Landscape Appreciation. Prentice Hall. pp. 416–7. ISBN 0-13-020263-0.
