= Little Picacho Wilderness =

Protected wilderness area in California, United States

- IUCN category Ib (wilderness area)
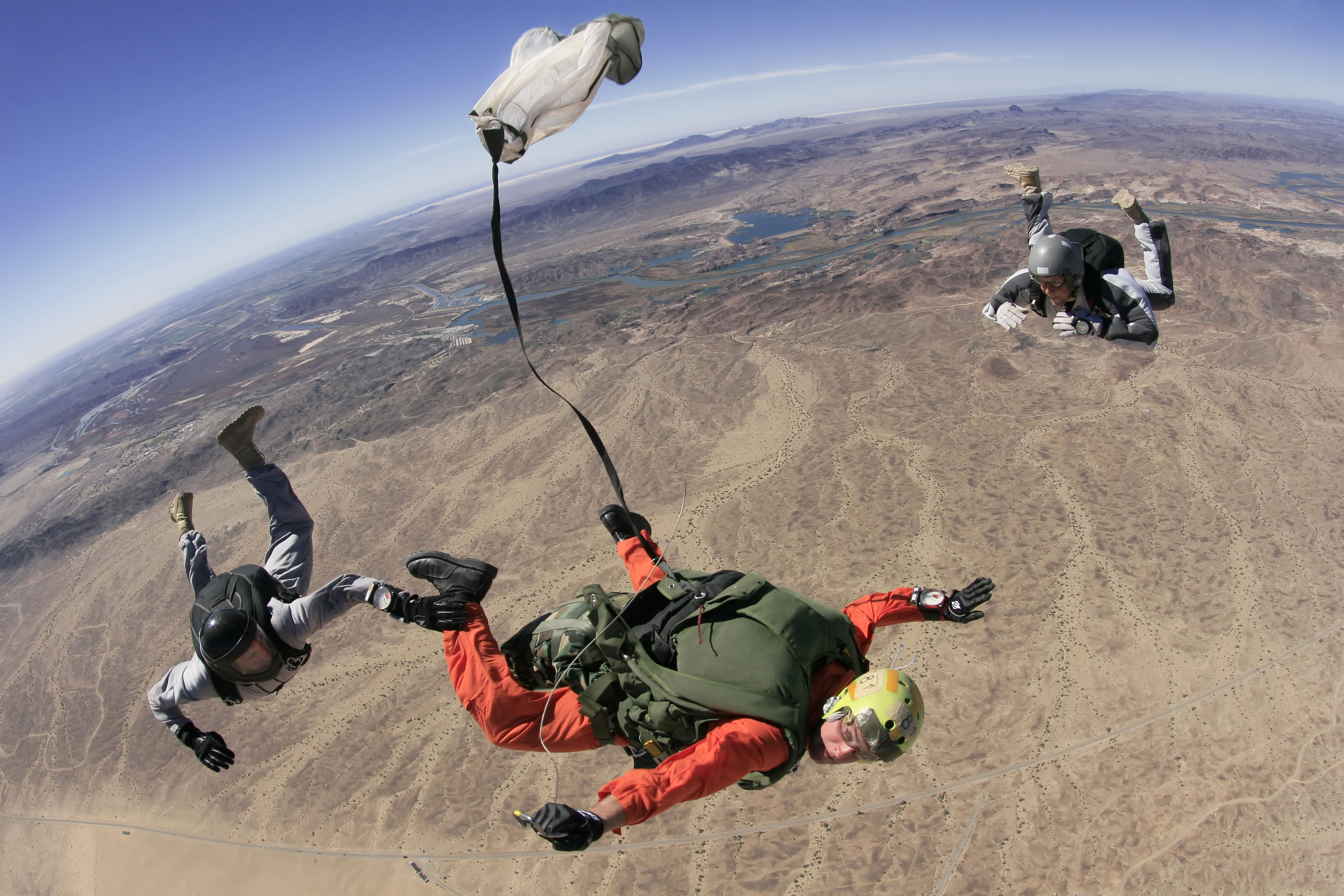
- (view west); The Little Picacho Wilderness is at the north region of the black linear mountain range, a western section of the Chocolate Mountains. The dark prominence shown at right (north) in the range, is Picacho Peak.

- Location within southern California Location within California Location within the United States
- Interactive map of Little Picacho Wilderness
- Location: Imperial County, California, United States
- Nearest city: Yuma, Arizona
- Coordinates: 32°56′21″N 114°34′08″W
- Area: 38,214 acres (154.65 km^{2})
- Established: 1994
- Governing body: U.S. Bureau of Land Management

The Little Picacho Wilderness is a 38,214-acre (15,465 ha) wilderness area under the jurisdiction of the Bureau of Land Management. The wilderness is found in a southeast extension of the Chocolate Mountains adjacent to the Colorado River, in the southeastern part of California. It should not be confused with the Picacho Peak Wilderness which is located to the northeast.

At elevations ranging from 200 to 1,500 feet (100 to 500 m), the wilderness is home to the Picacho wild horse, which roams the northwestern 5,000 acres (2,000 ha) part of the wilderness. The wilderness provides habitat for wild burro, desert tortoise, spotted bat and desert bighorn sheep.

The Little Picacho Wilderness is one of a number of federally protected areas located north of Yuma, Arizona and south of Blythe, California in the Lower Colorado River Valley.

== See also ==
- Little Picacho Wilderness flora
- Chocolate Mountains
- Indian Pass Wilderness
