= Maximum magnitude =

An important parameter in the calculation of seismic hazard, maximum magnitude (expressed as Moment magnitude scale) is also one of the more contentious. The choice of the value can greatly influence the outcome of the results, yet this is most likely a size of earthquake that has not yet occurred in the region under study.

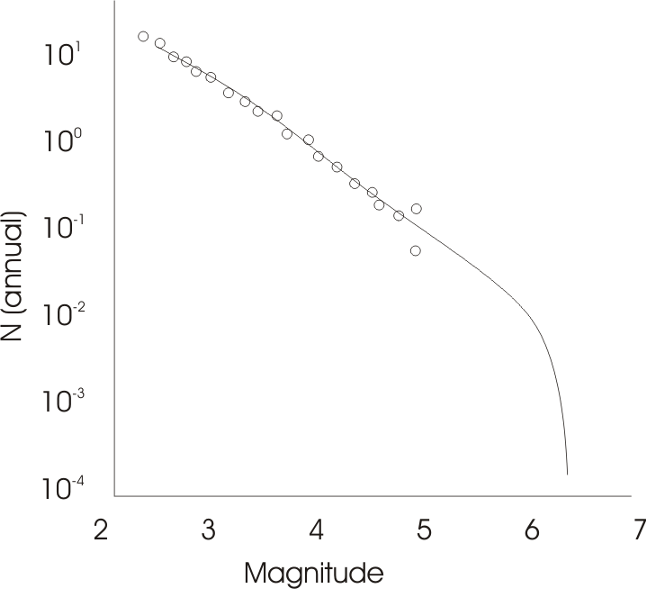
Frequency-magnitude plot

The seismic hazard calculation involves a double integration (integral) over the region, combined with the expected number (earthquake frequency) of earthquakes, from the smallest to the largest. The integration must close at the maximum magnitude. The figure shows a typical 'earthquake frequency' plot for a given region.

This is a typical plot for continental interiors. The circles represent actual earthquake data. Note that the dataset is complete for small magnitudes, but becomes erratic for the larger. At about M5, there are no records, simply because the historical record is usually too short. In some cases paleoseismology can fill some of the gap, but this is rare for continental regions.

The last part of the curve, perhaps the most important part, can be filled in by inference. This would come from studying similar geology throughout the world (using analogs to extend time), or by a study of fault mechanics. For example, large-scale studies have been conducted for Stable Continental Regions (SCR's), which are defined "as regions of continental crust that have not experienced any major tectonism, magmatism, basement metamorphism or anorogenic intrusion since the early Cretaceous, and no rifting or major extension or transtension since the Paleogene."

Finally there is the common question of what is the maximum magnitude for the whole world. Unfortunately, it cannot really be answered, since this earthquake has most likely not happened in the historical record, and we cannot search beyond the earth for analogs. Answers can again be inferred using the finite size of the world's plates (plate tectonics), and the possible limits of the various magnitude scales. The specific value, however, is not directly relevant to most people, since, except for tsunamis, the local shaking effects come to a maximum at about M8, and greater earthquakes simply extend the rupture distance.
