= Little Chuckwalla Mountains =

Mountain range in California, United States

- Location within southern California Location within California Location within the United States

Highest point
- Elevation: 6,191 ft (1,887 m)

Geography
- Country: United States
- State: California
- District: southeastern Riverside County
- Range coordinates: 33°29′44″N 114°59′10″W
- Topo map(s): USGS Hopkins Well, Wiley Well, Little Chuckwalla Mtns, and East of Aztec Mines 7.5 Minute Quads

The Little Chuckwalla Mountains are a mountain range in southeastern Riverside County, California. The range lies southeast of the Chuckwalla Mountains, north of the Chocolate Mountains and south of I-10.

== Little Chuckwalla Mountains Wilderness ==
The Little Chuckwalla Mountains Wilderness was established in 1994 by the U.S. Congress and consists of 28,052 acres managed by the Bureau of Land Management. This desert wilderness area protects the dry and rugged mountain range that rises to 2,100 feet (640 m). It is mostly in Riverside County with a small portion in Imperial County.

The area is habitat for desert bighorn sheep and the desert tortoise. Local vegetation includes California snakeweed, Alverson's foxtail cactus and the barrel cactus.

== History ==
The Chuckwalla Mountains, including the Little Chuckwalla Mountains, have had many visitors over the millennia, as they are situated near heavily traveled east-west routes and feature several sources of water, like the Chuckwalla Springs, the most prominent being Corn Springs. Several successful mines have been dug, including the Red Cloud, Aztec, and Granite.

Friar Francisco Garcés, traveling north on the Colorado River reached the Pools of Tesquier/Tesquien today known as Chuckwalla Springs on February 25, 1776 on an expedition to the San Gabriel Mission near Los Angeles from Tucson, possibly by using the Halchidoma Trail. Garcés traveled around the Mojave Desert, eventually reaching his destination through the Cajon Pass/Mojave Trail.
