= Indian Pass Wilderness =

Protected wilderness area in California, United States

- IUCN category Ib (wilderness area)
- Location within southern California Location within California Location within the United States
- Interactive map of Indian Pass Wilderness
- Location: Imperial County, California, United States
- Nearest city: Yuma, Arizona
- Coordinates: 33.0808720°N 114.7746828°W
- Area: 32,418 acres (13,119 ha)
- Established: 1994
- Governing body: U.S. Bureau of Land Management

The Indian Pass Wilderness is 32,418-acre (13,119 ha) wilderness area under the administered by the Bureau of Land Management. The reserve is located in the very southeastern part of the Chocolate Mountains, in the southeastern part of California, just to the west of the Colorado River in the Lower Colorado River Valley. It adjoins the Picacho Peak Wilderness to the south, and the Imperial National Wildlife Refuge to the east.

Quartz Peak at 2,126 feet (648 m) lies in the west of the wilderness. Julian Wash, which drains eastwards into the Colorado River, marks the center of the wilderness and gives the name "Julian Wash Country" to the wilderness area.

Animals such as the Colorado River toad, desert bighorn sheep, and wild burros live in the refuge habitat.

== See also ==
- California Desert Protection Act of 1994
- Chocolate Mountains
- Imperial National Wildlife Refuge
