= Piercing point =

Geological feature that is cut by a fault, then moved apart

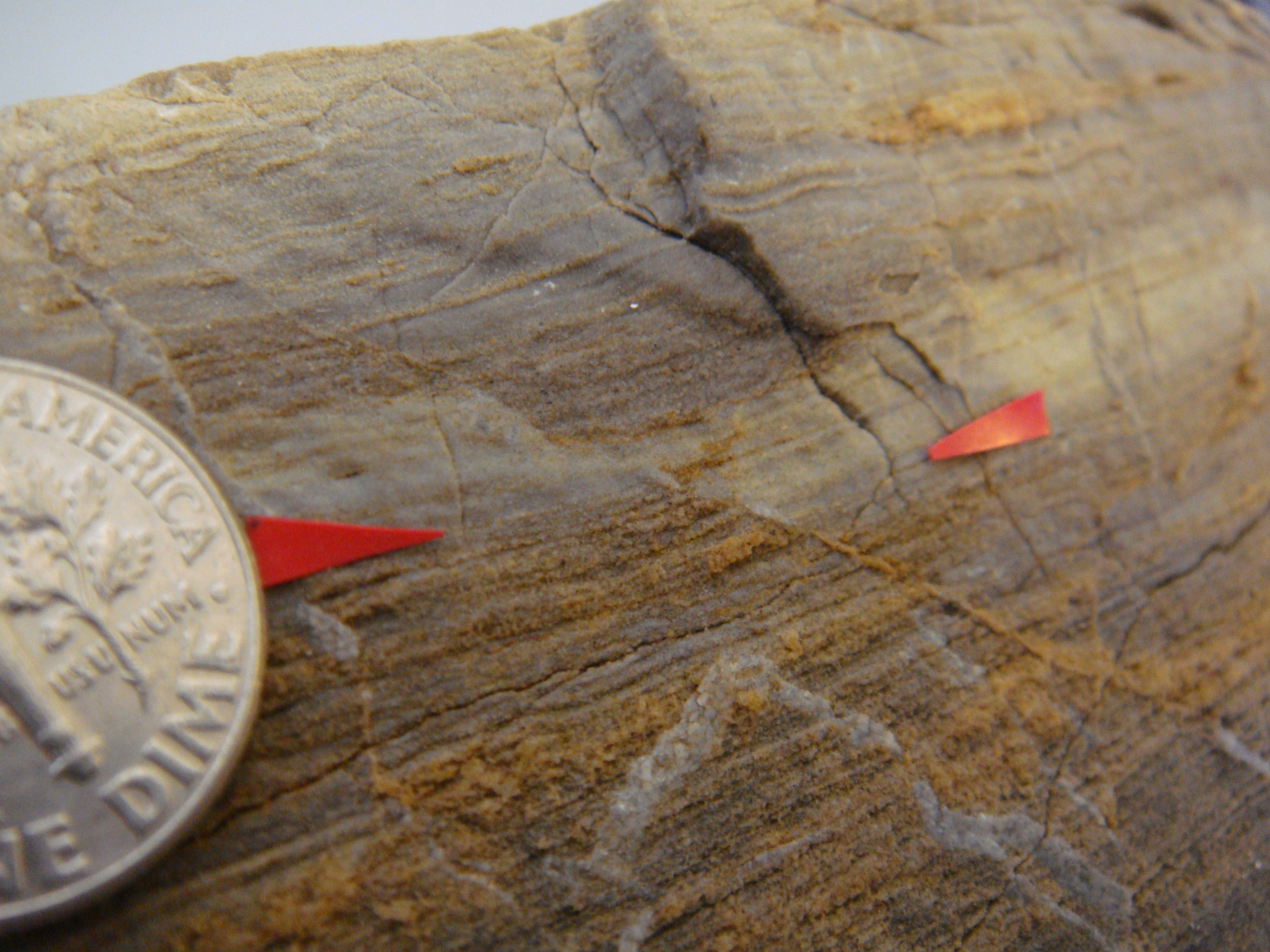
Microfault showing an example of a piercing point. The base of the white bed (layer), shown with red arrows, is an indication of the amount of offset on this fault. The fault is coated orange and runs from the upper left to the lower right of the picture, truncating the white bed. U.S. dime for scale.

In geology, a piercing point is a feature (usually a geologic feature, preferably a linear feature) that is cut by a fault, then moved apart. Reconfiguring the piercing point back in its original position is the primary way geologists can find out the minimum slip, or displacement, along a fault. This can be done on a large scale (over many kilometers), a small scale (inside a single outcrop or fault trench), or even a single hand sample/rock (see image).

Items that are usually used in a piercing point study include large geologic formations or other rock units that can be matched either stratigraphically, geochemically, or by age dating. Features that are linear or planar, like a stratigraphic unit, are much better for use in a piercing point study than rounds or irregular-shaped objects, such as a pluton, because the reconstruction is always more precise with a more predictable shape (because of the Principle of lateral continuity). Of course, it is important to keep in mind that piercing points only give a minimum amount of offset that fault could have taken. In certain situations, rock units can be created as fault movement occurs, making the piercing point measurement even less than a minimum value.

Mason Hill and Thomas Dibblee were the first to use piercing points along the San Andreas Fault, notably the Pelona schist in the San Gabriel Mountains and Orocopia schist in the Orocopia Mountains, in 1953; they showed at least 250 km (160 mi) of slip using that piercing point. Another famous example of San Andreas fault piercing points include the unique rocks at Point Lobos State Reserve and Point Reyes National Seashore. Though 180 km apart, the rocks match exactly: they were cut and separated by the fault. A complete, detailed analysis shows that the movement, while uncertain because of the various piercing points used, is over 300 km (190 mi) since the Miocene. Piercing points are used on faults other than the San Andreas, like the Hilina fault system in Hawaii and the Lake Clark fault system in Alaska.

In rare situations, even human structures built across a fault can be used, like an Ottoman Empire-era canal berm that was offset along the North Anatolian Fault zone in a 1754 earthquake and the 1999 Izmit earthquake in Turkey. The berm showed 3–4 meters (9.8–13.1 ft) of movement in the 1999 earthquake.
