= Chocolate Mountains =

Mountain range in California, United States

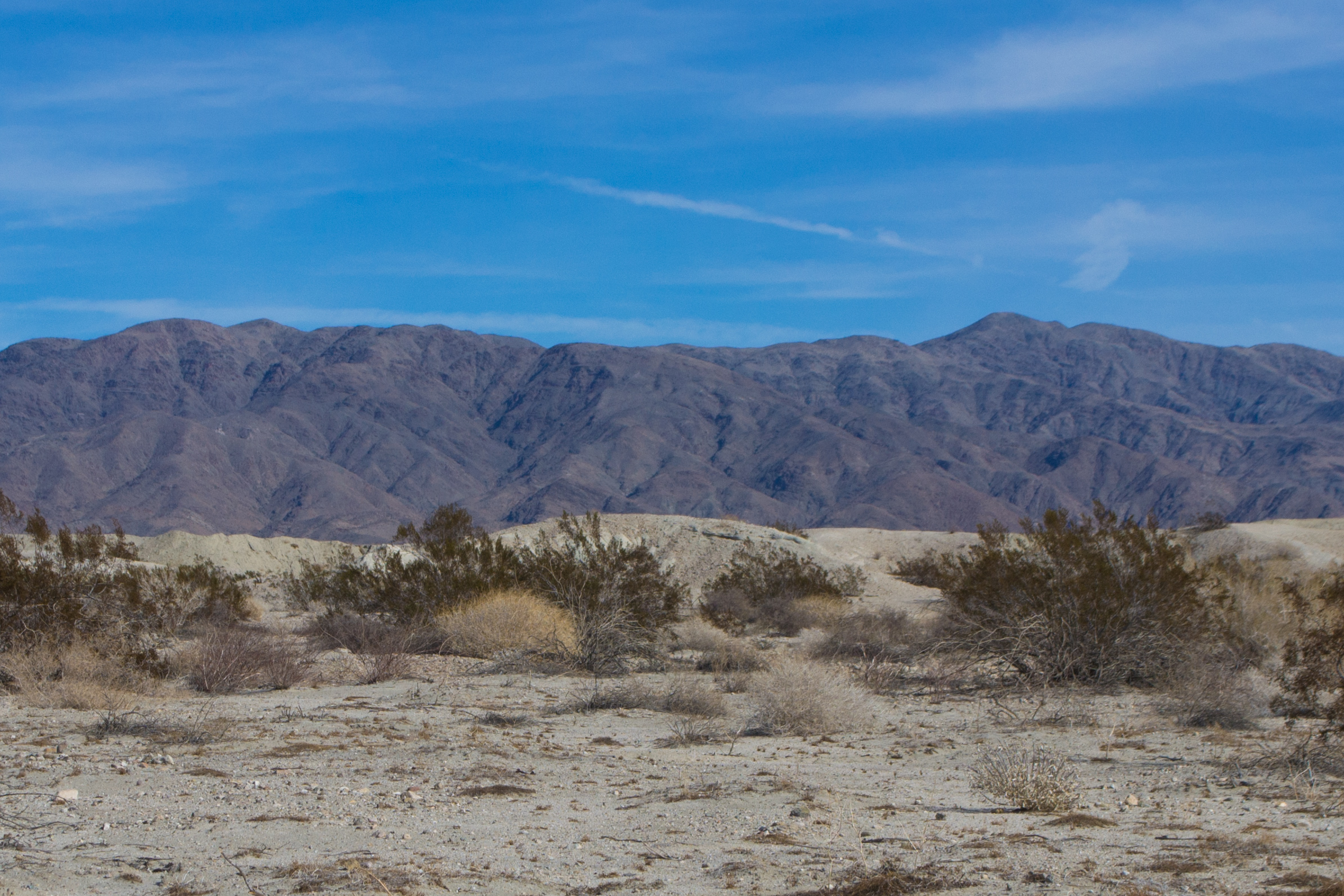

Highest point
- Elevation: 877 m (2,877 ft)

Geography
- Location within California
- Country: United States
- State: California
- District: Imperial County
- Range coordinates: 33°28′N 115°35′W
- Topo map: USGS Frink NE

The Chocolate Mountains of California are located in Imperial and Riverside counties in the Colorado Desert of Southern California. The mountains stretch more than 60 miles (100 km) in a northwest to southeast direction, and are located east of the Salton Sea and south and west of the Chuckwalla Mountains and the Colorado River. To the northwest lie the Orocopia Mountains.

== Geography ==
The Chocolate Mountains form the northeast boundary of the Salton Trough extending as a narrow range some 80 miles (130 km) southeast from the Orocopia Mountains to the Colorado River valley. The mountains are located about 30 miles (48 km) west of the Chocolate Mountains of Arizona, but the two ranges are not connected. The range reaches an elevation of 2,475 feet (754 m) at Mount Barrow, and serves as a drainage divide for the Salton Watershed to the west.

The mountains receive very little rainfall in a normal year, typically 4-6 inches (100 to 150 mm). The predominant natural plants are of the creosote bush–white bursage community, and the mean annual temperature is about 60 °F (16 °C) to 75 °F (24 °C).

== Geology ==
The range is composed of Precambrian basement rocks and Orocopia Schist with Mesozoic granite intrusions.

The range may have been formed by the collision of a microcontinental fragment with mainland Southern California during the Late Cretaceous. The collision is indicated by a thrust fault which emplaced Proterozoic and Mesozoic rocks of continental crust on top of the late Mesozoic Orocopia Schist which in turn was composed of oceanic sedimentary and volcanic rocks.

The range was host to numerous small gold workings in the 19th century with one, the Mesquite Mine to the east, continuing to be active into the 20th century.

== History ==
The Bradshaw Trail passed by the side of the mountains, the first "euroamerican" route to the Colorado River from Riverside, California.

=== Military closures ===
The mountain range is occupied by the Chocolate Mountain Aerial Gunnery Range, an aerial and gunnery practice area used by the United States Navy and Marines. A large part of the Chocolate Mountains lies within the gunnery range, and is closed to the public.

== Wilderness areas ==
=== Little Picacho Wilderness ===
At the southeastern end of the Chocolate Mountains range are two important wilderness areas. The first is the Little Picacho Wilderness, a 38,170 acre (154.5 km^{2}) region of geological features and habitat protection under the direction of the Bureau of Land Management. The preserve has within its boundaries the southern portion of the Chocolate Mountains. Elevations within this area range from 200 to 1,500 feet (460 m). The topography, characterized by jutting spires and steep ridges, is quite dramatic. Ravines laced within the range gradually broaden into sandy, tree-lined washes. Slopes and plains are devoid of vegetation, instead covered with a desert pavement of angular cobbles. These rusty dark orange and brown colored cobbles stand out against the nearly white bottoms of the washes. It is also called the Little Picacho Peak Wilderness.

=== Indian Pass Wilderness ===
The Indian Pass Wilderness Area is to the north with 32,008 acres (129.53 km^{2}) of open space. The Indian Pass Wilderness is a distinctive part of the Chocolate Mountains, a range which extends from south central Riverside County to the Colorado River near Yuma, Arizona. Quartz Peak is the highest point in the wilderness capped at 2,200 feet (670 m). Jagged peaks and spires are sliced by mazes of twisting canyons which carry water from occasional desert cloudbursts into several tree-lined washes. One of these washes passes through the heart of the wilderness area, giving rise to the region's local name, "Julian Wash country." The area's proximity to the Colorado River and the Arizona Desert contribute to the presence of wildlife species not commonly found in the California Desert.

At the southern end of the Chocolate Mountains at elevations from 200 to 1,500 feet (460 m), the Indian Pass Wilderness preserve is located 50 miles (80 km) east of Brawley, California, and is also managed by the Bureau of Land Management. A herd of 25 desert bighorn sheep reside in the wilderness area, along with "the Picacho feral horses," wild burros, and the native and endangered desert tortoise and spotted bat.

== See also ==
- List of Sonoran Desert wildflowers
