= Polygonal fault =

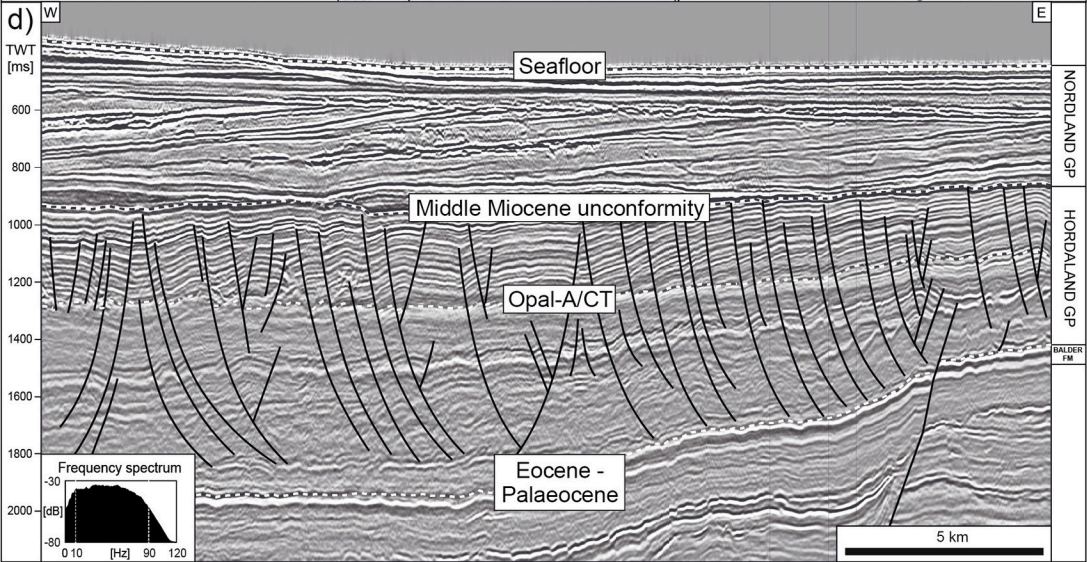
Example of polygonal faults from offshore Norway, Wrona et al. (2017)

Polygonal faults are small non-tectonic faults that are characteristic mainly of poorly to unconsolidated fine-grained sediments. They occur as sets that are polygonal in map view and are restricted to particular layers within the sequence. They have been observed over huge areas, up to 10^{7} km^{2} in extent and have been described from passive margins around the world. Most examples have been identified using 3D seismic reflection data acquired offshore, but a few examples are known that can be studied onshore. Several different mechanisms have been proposed for the formation of polygonal faults, but their origin remains uncertain.

== Occurrence ==
Polygonal fault systems (PFS) are widely distributed globally, having been described from at least 160 basins, particularly on passive margins, but also in some intracratonic and foreland basins. PFS are associated with a range of fine-grained lithologies, especially unconsolidated muds and chalk. The PFS are layer bound, with clearly-defined stratigraphic tops and bases. The individual layers within an overall sequence that develops multiple sets of polygonal faults are known as tiers.

Although most examples of PFS are known from offshore areas and imaged by seismic data, there are a few locations worldwide where PFS can be visited at outcrop, many of them in chalk. In Belgium outcrops of marine clays of Ypresian (earliest Eocene) age have been studied in clay pits. These marine clays (approximate lateral equivalents of the London Clay) can be traced offshore where typical PFS have been imaged within the same stratigraphic interval on high resolution seismic data.

== Geometry ==
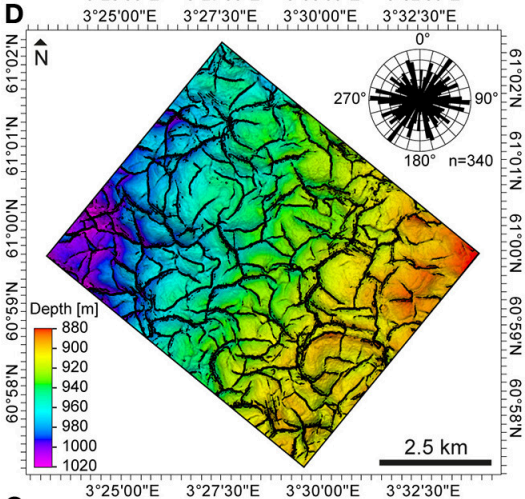
Depth map to a horizon affected by polygonal faults, Wrona et al. (2017)

In most cases the faults are randomly orientated, forming overall polygonal geometries in plan view, indicating an isotropic stress state within the affected layer. On section perpendicular to individual faults they have a normal fault geometry, however there is no evidence that the faulting represents any extension of pre-existing layering and they are regarded as non-tectonic in origin. In some examples the upper ends of the PFS reach and offset the seabed. The upper parts of the faults typically dip in the range 50–80°, while towards the base of a tier dips as low as 20° are sometimes observed. The lower dips near the base of a tier are explained as a result of continuing compaction of faults that formed at higher angles.

Although most PFS are close to polygonal in map view geometry, there are examples where active tectonics during the PFS development has modified the fault network, such as radial systems around salt diapirs, systems becoming dominantly parallel to reactivated earlier faults and polygonal patterns becoming reorientated across inversion folds.

== Mechanism of formation ==
Since the recognition of PFS in the 1980s, several mechanisms have been proposed to explain their development. Gravity-driven extension along the layering caused by sliding downslope was one of the initial mechanisms proposed, but this has subsequently been discounted as many known PFS layers are near horizontal. Syneresis, which involves the expulsion of water from certain types of smectite-rich muds that form colloidal gels in seawater, has been proposed as a mechanism, as many of the first PFS described were found in smectite-rich sequences. Another mechanism relates the observed faulting to volume reduction within the host layer as a result of diagenesis. The volume reduction in a layer gives rise to deviatoric stresses that lead to failure of the material along shear fractures (faults). Such a mechanism has been numerically modelled and produces geometries similar to those in observed PFS.
