= Mitigation of seismic motion =

Mitigation of seismic motion is an important factor in earthquake engineering and construction in earthquake-prone areas. The destabilizing action of an earthquake on constructions may be direct (seismic motion of the ground) or indirect (earthquake-induced landslides, liquefaction of the foundation soils and waves of tsunami).

Knowledge of local amplification of the seismic motion from the bedrock is very important in order to choose the suitable design solutions. Local amplification can be anticipated from the presence of particular stratigraphic conditions, such as soft soil overlapping the bedrock, or where morphological settings (e.g. crest zones, steep slopes, valleys, or endorheic basins) may produce focalization of the seismic event.

The identification of the areas potentially affected by earthquake-induced landslides and by soil liquefaction can be made by geological survey and by analysis of historical documents. Even quiescent and stabilized landslide areas may be reactivated by severe earthquake. Young soil may be particularly susceptible to liquefaction.

== See also ==
- Base isolation
- Seismic hazard
- Seismic performance
- Tuned mass damper
- Vibration control
- Crash testing
