= Mecca Hills =

Mountain range in California, United States

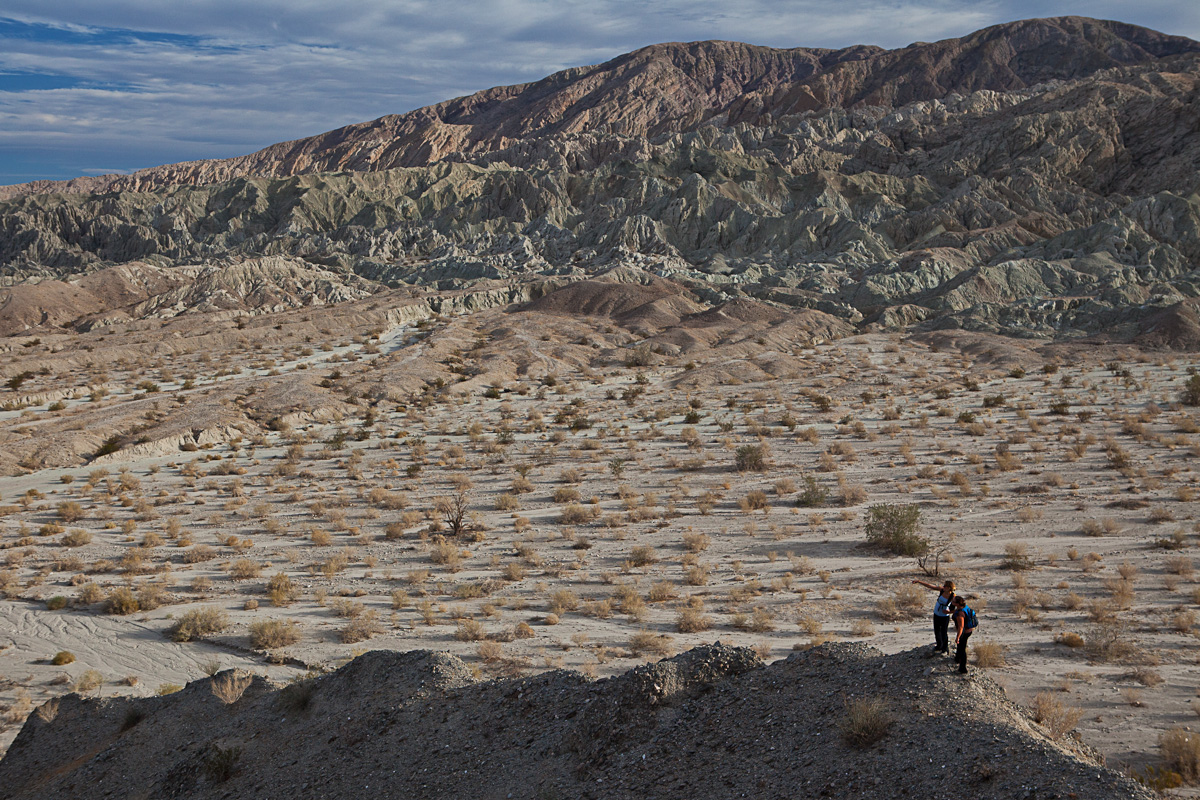

Highest point
- Elevation: 1,239 ft (378 m)

Geography
- Location within southern California Location within California Location within the United States
- Country: United States
- State: California
- Region: Colorado Desert
- District: Riverside County
- Range coordinates: 33°37′43″N 116°01′00″W
- Topo map: USGS Thermal Canyon

The Mecca Hills are a low mountain range located in Riverside County, southern California, in the United States.

The Mecca Hills are in the Colorado Desert section of the Sonoran Desert, adjacent to the Lower Colorado River Valley region. The range lies in an east-west direction, east of the Coachella Valley, west of the Chuckwalla Mountains, and south of Interstate 10. The Mecca Hills are north of the Salton Sea and south of Joshua Tree National Park, with the Orocopia Mountains to the southeast.

== Wilderness ==
Established in 1994 by the U.S. Congress, the U.S. Bureau of Land Management manages the 26,356 acre Mecca Hills Wilderness. The designated wilderness area includes narrow steep-walled canyons that create a natural maze within the badlands. Uniquely faulted and folded geologic formations are the result of activity on the local sections of the San Andreas Fault, making the Mecca Hills one of the more unusual geological sites of this kind.
