= Seismic hazard =

Earthquake probability in a specific area and time

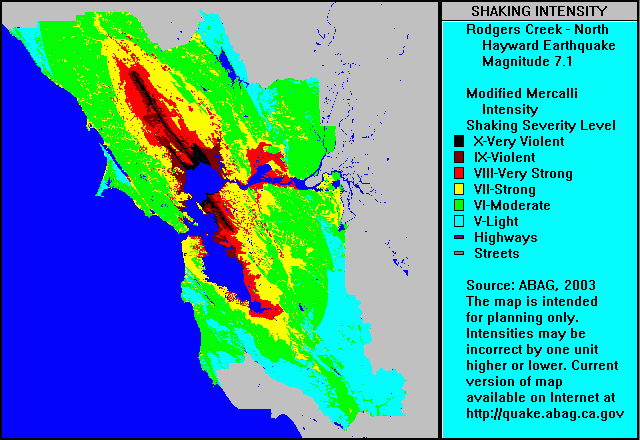
Surface motion map for a hypothetical earthquake on the northern portion of the Hayward Fault Zone and its presumed northern extension, the Rodgers Creek Fault Zone

A seismic hazard is the probability that an earthquake will occur in a given geographic area, within a given window of time, and with ground motion intensity exceeding a given threshold. With a hazard thus estimated, seismic risk can be assessed and included in such areas as building codes for standard buildings, designing larger buildings and infrastructure projects, land use planning and determining insurance rates.

The seismic hazard studies also may generate two standard measures of anticipated ground motion, both confusingly abbreviated MCE; the simpler probabilistic maximum considered earthquake (or event), used in standard building codes, and the more detailed and deterministic maximum credible earthquake incorporated in the design of larger buildings and civil infrastructure like dams or bridges. It is important to be clear which MCE is being discussed.

== Determination ==
Calculations for determining seismic hazard were first formulated by C. Allin Cornell in 1968 and, depending on their level of importance and use, can be quite complex. The regional geology and seismology setting is first examined for sources and patterns of earthquake occurrence, both in depth and at the surface from seismometer records; secondly, the impacts from these sources are assessed relative to local geologic rock and soil types, slope angle and groundwater conditions. Zones of similar potential earthquake shaking are thus determined and drawn on maps. The well known San Andreas Fault is illustrated as a long narrow elliptical zone of greater potential motion, like many areas along continental margins associated with the Pacific Ring of Fire. Zones of higher seismicity in the continental interior may be the site for intraplate earthquakes) and tend to be drawn as broad areas, based on historic records, like the 1812 New Madrid earthquake, since specific causative faults are generally not identified as earthquake sources.

Each zone is given properties associated with source potential: how many earthquakes per year, the maximum size of earthquakes (maximum magnitude), etc. Finally, the calculations require formulae that give the required hazard indicators for a given earthquake size and distance. For example, some districts prefer to use peak acceleration, others use peak velocity, and more sophisticated uses require response spectral ordinates.

The computer program then integrates over all the zones and produces probability curves for the key ground motion parameter. The final result gives a 'chance' of exceeding a given value over a specified amount of time. Standard building codes for homeowners might be concerned with a 1 in 500 years chance, while nuclear plants look at the 10,000 year time frame. A longer-term seismic history can be obtained through paleoseismology. The results may be in the form of a ground response spectrum for use in seismic analysis.

More elaborate variations on the theme also look at the soil conditions. Higher ground motions are likely to be experienced on a soft swamp compared to a hard rock site. The standard seismic hazard calculations become adjusted upwards when postulating characteristic earthquakes. Areas with high ground motion due to soil conditions are also often subject to soil failure due to liquefaction. Soil failure can also occur due to earthquake-induced landslides in steep terrain. Large area landsliding can also occur on rather gentle slopes as was seen in the Good Friday earthquake in Anchorage, Alaska, March 28, 1964.

== Maximum considered/credible earthquakes ==
Map of peak ground acceleration with 2% probability of exceedance in 50 years in the US

In a normal seismic hazard analyses intended for the public, that of a "maximum considered earthquake", or "maximum considered event" (MCE) for a specific area, is an earthquake that is expected to occur once in approximately 2,500 years; that is, it has a 2-percent probability of being exceeded in 50 years. The term is used specifically for general building codes, which people commonly occupy; building codes in many localities will require non-essential buildings to be designed for "collapse prevention" in an MCE, so that the building remains standing – allowing for safety and escape of occupants – rather than full structural survival of the building.

A far more detailed and stringent MCE stands for "maximum credible earthquake", which is used in designing for skyscrapers and larger civil infrastructure, like dams, where structural failure could lead to other catastrophic consequences. These MCEs might require determining more than one specific earthquake event, depending on the variety of structures included.

== Seismic hazard maps ==
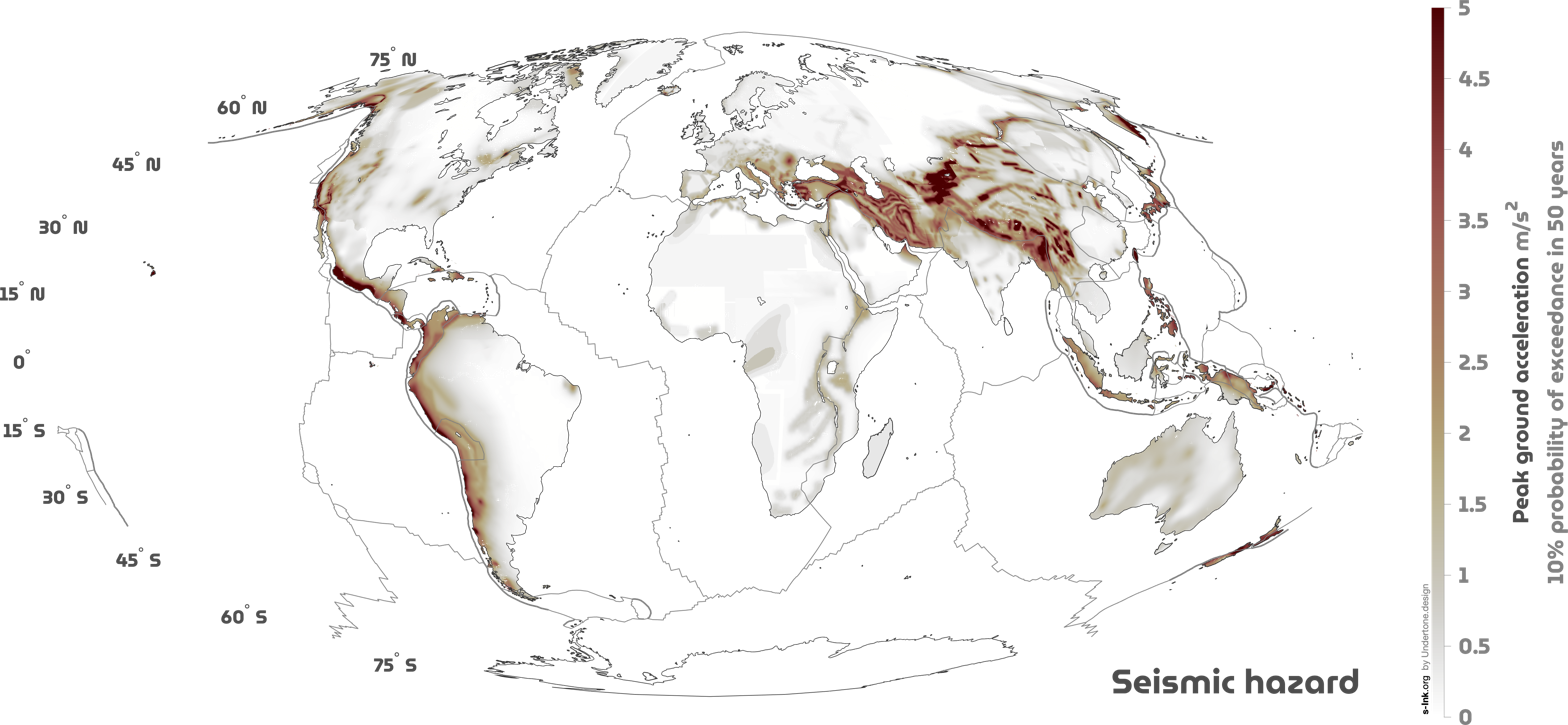
Color-blind friendly global map of peak ground acceleration with 10% probability of exceedance in 50 years

Some maps released by the USGS are shown with peak ground acceleration with a 10% probability of exceedance in 50 years, measured in metre per second squared. For parts of the US, the National Seismic Hazard Mapping Project in 2008 resulted in seismic hazard maps showing peak acceleration (as a percentage of gravity) with a 2% probability of exceedance in 50 years. Temblor, a company founded in 2014, offers a seismic hazard rank for all of the conterminous US. This service is free and ad-free for the public. The hazard rank "is made for the likelihood of experiencing strong shaking (0.4g peak ground acceleration) in 30 years, based on the 2014 USGS NSHMP hazard model."

Global seismic hazard maps similarly present the level of certain ground motions that have a 10% probability of exceedance (or a 90% chance of non-exceedance) during a 50-year time span (that corresponds to a return period of 475 years).

== See also ==
- Earthquake engineering
- Mitigation of seismic motion
- Neotectonics
- Seismic loading
- Seismic vibration control
