= Corn Springs =

Archaeological site in California, United States

- U.S. National Register of Historic Places
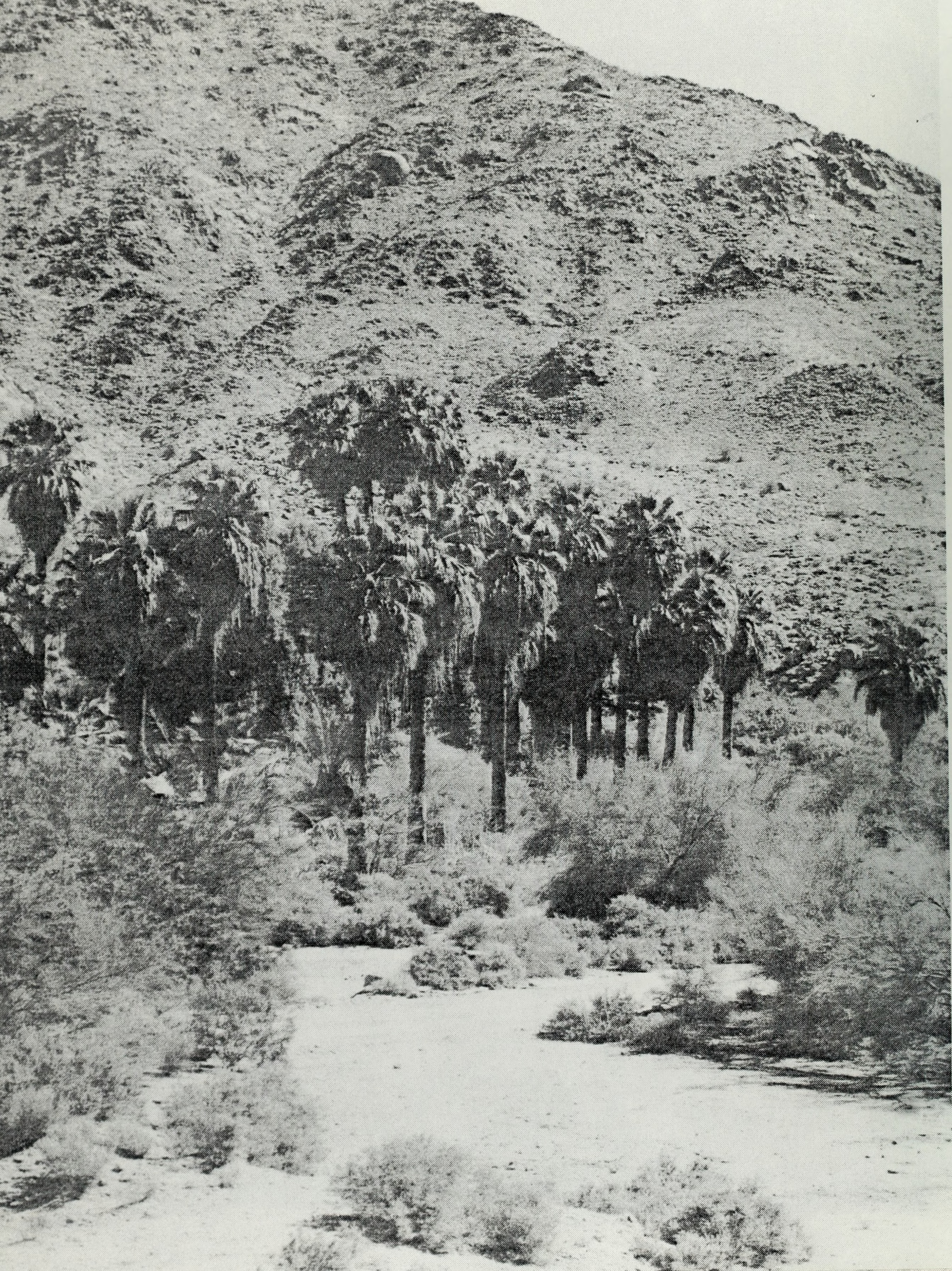
- Washingtonia filifera trees at Corn Springs
- Nearest city: Desert Center, California
- NRHP reference No.: 98001286
- Added to NRHP: October 30, 1998

Corn Springs is a palm oasis situated in the Chuckwalla Mountains of the Colorado Desert in Riverside County, California, United States, seventeen miles southeast of Desert Center. Native Americans relied on the springs, and they engraved many petroglyphs on the rocks in the area. In the late 19th century, miners in the area also relied on the springs, and they established the Corn Springs Mining District in 1897.

The springs were added to the United States National Register of Historic Places in 1998. In 2025, Corn Springs became part of the Chuckwalla National Monument.

== History ==
The springs were used for thousands of years by nomadic Native Americans. The Chemehuevi, Desert Cahuilla and Yuma bands frequented the spring and carved elaborate petroglyphs in the nearby rocks. Some of the oldest rock art is over 10,000 years old. At times, there was enough surface water for gardening by the springs. The Indians also utilized the fruit of the palms.

Early white visitors found feral corn plants in the vicinity, giving the spring its present name.

In the late 19th century, miners came to the area and used the water for processing their gold ore. The most notable resident of the spring was Gus Lederer, the self-proclaimed "Mayor of Corn Springs". Lederer lived at the spring until 1932, when he died from a black widow spider bite, and was subsequently buried at Aztec Wells". Following Lederer's death in 1932, the land passed into public domain and the Bureau of Land Management (BLM) established a campground.

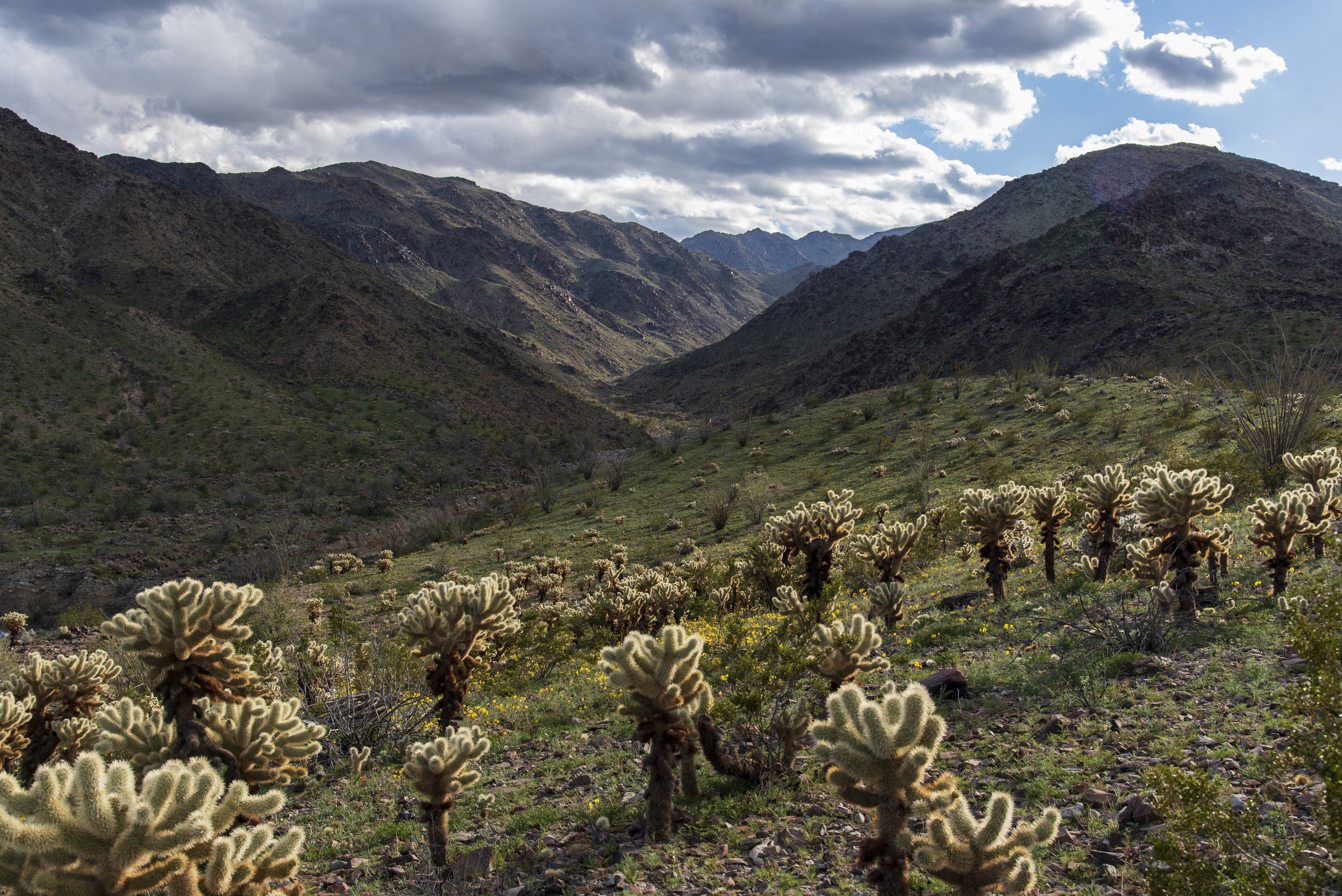
A portion of the Corn Springs Campground, run by the Bureau of Land Management

A BLM-run campground, with a well for drawing water from the spring, was established nearby. One mile past the camp ground is a miner's cabin and the remains of one of the mills. Edward Wodetzki and family mined this area until the early 1980s. At the time they had numerous gold, silver, and iron ore claims. More mines and cabins are located further up the road.

== Geography ==
The area is located on the USGS Corn Spring, California, 7.5-minute quadrangle (1981) at latitude/longitude 33°37′34″N 115°19′31″W. Over 60 California Fan Palms surround the spring. Typically there is no surface flow, but the wash that drains the area is named the Corn Springs Wash.

The spring is dynamic, and for unknown reasons the amount of water coming to the surface has fluctuated widely over the years. The source of the water is unknown – very little rain falls in the area, and the nearest body of water is the Colorado River, over 40 miles to the east.

The spring can be reached via Corn Springs Road from Chuckawalla Valley Road just off Interstate 10, about halfway between Indio and Blythe.
