= Fault mechanics =

Field of study that investigates the behavior of geologic faults

An element of rock under stress

Fault mechanics is a field of study that investigates the behavior of geologic faults.

Behind every good earthquake is some weak rock. Whether the rock remains weak becomes an important point in determining the potential for bigger earthquakes.

On a small scale, fractured rock behaves essentially the same throughout the world, in that the angle of friction is more or less uniform (see Fault friction). A small element of rock in a larger mass responds to stress changes in a well defined manner: if it is squeezed by differential stresses greater than its strength, it is capable of large deformations. A band of weak, fractured rock in a competent mass can deform to resemble a classic geologic fault. Using seismometers and earthquake location, the requisite pattern of micro-earthquakes can be observed.

Penny-shape cracks in rock

For earthquakes, it all starts with an embedded penny-shaped crack as first envisioned by Brune. As illustrated, an earthquake zone may start as a single crack, growing to form many individual cracks and collections of cracks along a fault. The key to fault growth is the concept of a "following force", as conveniently provided for interplate earthquakes, by the motion of tectonic plates. Under a following force, the seismic displacements eventually form a topographic feature, such as a mountain range.

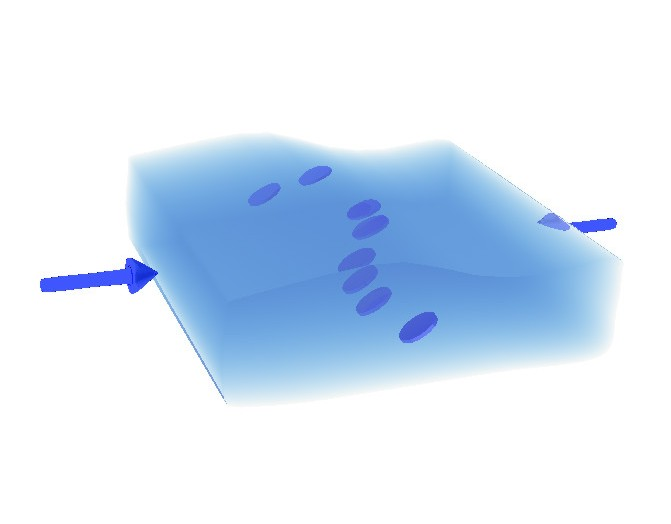
Following forces forming a mountain range

Intraplate earthquakes do not have a following force, and are not associated with mountain building. Thus, there is the puzzling question of how long any interior active zone has to live. For, in a solid stressed plate, every seismic displacement acts to relieve (reduce) stress; the fault zone should come to equilibrium; and all seismic activity cease. One can see this type of arching "lockup" in many natural processes.

In fact, the seismic zone (such as the New Madrid Fault Zone) is ensured eternal life by the action of water. As shown, if we add the equivalent of a giant funnel to the crack, it becomes the beneficiary of stress corrosion (the progressive weakening of the crack edge by water). If there is a continuing supply of new water, the system does not come to equilibrium, but continues to grow, ever relieving stress from a larger and larger volume.

Fresh water continually being injected

Thus the prerequisite for a continuing seismically active interior zone is the presence of water, the ability of the water to get down to the fault source (high permeability), and the usual high horizontal interior stresses of the rock mass. All small earthquake zones have the potential to grow to resemble New Madrid or Charlevoix.

== See also ==
- Active fault – Geological fault likely to be the source of an earthquake sometime in the future
- Orogeny – Formation of mountain ranges
- Aseismic creep
