= Fault friction =

Fault friction describes the relation of friction to fault mechanics. Rock failure and associated earthquakes are very much a fractal operation (see Characteristic earthquake). The process remains scale-invariant down to the smallest crystal. Thus, the behaviour of massive earthquakes is dependent on the properties of single molecular irregularities or asperities.

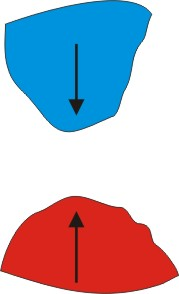
Two crystal asperities approaching

If two clean nano-asperities are brought together in a vacuum, a cold weld will result. That is, the crystal tips will fuse as if one (cohesion). In nature these tips are actually covered with a thin film of foreign material. By far, the most important component of this film, is water.

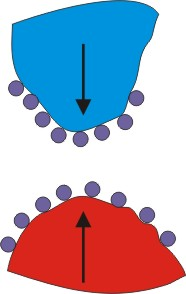
Crystal asperities with a thin film

If this water is removed, by extreme drying, the rock minerals do not behave at all as expected: they exhibit no fault healing or dynamic friction. The entire behaviour of earthquakes depends on very thin films.

After a major earthquake, there starts a process known as fault healing. This is a well-demonstrated phenomenon involving a slow increase in the static coefficient of friction. With our nano-model, it is a matter of slowly pushing away the junk for a good cohesive bond. With typical minerals and water, there is another mechanism, whereby the water causes stress corrosion and weakening of the main asperity body (smoothing the irregularities), allowing more plastic deformation, and more contact.

The most important aspect is that this bond-strengthening is time-dependent. For a fault being stressed to the point of an earthquake, these bonds begin to stretch and break. They do not have time to heal again. Once the critical distance has been achieved, there is a significant strength loss, and the fault begins to slide.

Earthquakes only exist because there is a very large loss in frictional strength. It could be that the earthquake "skids" are greased by silica gel, the water acts as a standard bearing lubricant, or that there is a "lift and separate" mechanism at work.

== Effect of fluids ==
All rocks have a certain degree of porosity, with some rock types having a much higher porosity than others. This means that between the individual grains of the rock, there are small pores which can be filled with a gas (usually air) or a fluid. The commonest pore fluid is water, and the presence of water can vary the friction on a fault to a large degree. As water accumulates in the pore space of a body of rock around a fault, the pressure inside the pores builds. On the interface of a presently stable fault, an increase in pore pressure has the effect of essentially pushing the fault apart at a microscopic level. This pore pressure increase can then decrease the surface area of the individual asperities in contact on the fault, causing them to then fracture and the fault to slip. However, the presence of water may not always cause a reduction in friction.

== Influence of rock type ==
The rock type along a fault can have a large effect on the amount of frictional resistance present. Most crystalline rock types will have a much higher coefficient of friction as opposed to sedimentary rocks, due to their higher cohesion and a greater surface area of asperities. The rock type also controls the effect that water will have on fault friction. Laboratory experiments have proved that the presence of water will promote the rupture of a fault in carbonate rocks (marble). However, these experiments also showed that in silica-bearing rock types (microgabbro), the presence of water may delay or even inhibit the rupture of a fault. This is because when a silica-bearing fault ruptures, the rupture occurs through the "flash melting" (instantaneous melting) of the asperities. In other words, the microscopic grain contacts which hold the fault in place instantly melt due to high stresses. The presence of water delays this "flash melting" basically by cooling the contacts, and keeping them in solid form. In fault through a carbonate, the rupture occurs when these asperities experience a brittle failure. In this case, the water acts as a lubricant which promotes the failure of these asperities. The major controlling factor pertaining to the influence of rock type is not necessarily the composition of the rock, but more importantly the "roughness" of the rock at the fault interface.

== Fault lubrication (during faulting) ==
Once a fault begins to slip, the initial frictional heat produced by the fault is extremely intense. This is because two rock faces are sliding against each other at a high speed and with a lot of force. Fault lubrication then is the phenomena whereby the friction on the fault surface decreases as it slips, making it easier for the fault to slip as it does so. One method by which this occurs is through frictional melting. As a fault slips, this immense amount of heat causes a thin layer of rock along the fault to become molten. This molten rock (frictional melt), can then expand and work its way into the pores and imperfections on the fault surface. This has the effect of smoothing the fault surface. You can think of this like the difference between trying to rub two pieces of sand paper past each other, then doing the same with two pieces of printer paper. A similar process can occur if there is water present in the rock. As the fault begins to slip, this rapid increase in temperature close to the fault causes the water in the pore space to vaporize. As the water vapor expands, it causes the pores along the fault surface to dilate and thereby creates a smoother surface at the fault interface. This process can actually create a "near frictionless" surface along the fault.

== Pseudotachylytes ==
Fault ruptures generate massive amounts of heat, which usually result in frictional melting. As a fault slips, this layer of molten rock is smeared and spread across the fault surface, and is forced into any other cracks or interstices that may exist in the surrounding rock. After this molten rock cools, the structure it leaves behind is known as a pseudotachylite. These pseudotachylites can form at pressures at or above roughly 0.7 GPa, which equates to deep crustal faulting. Their presence though, can help to identify the location of ancient faults that have since healed.
