= Chuckwalla Mountains =

Mountain range in California, United States

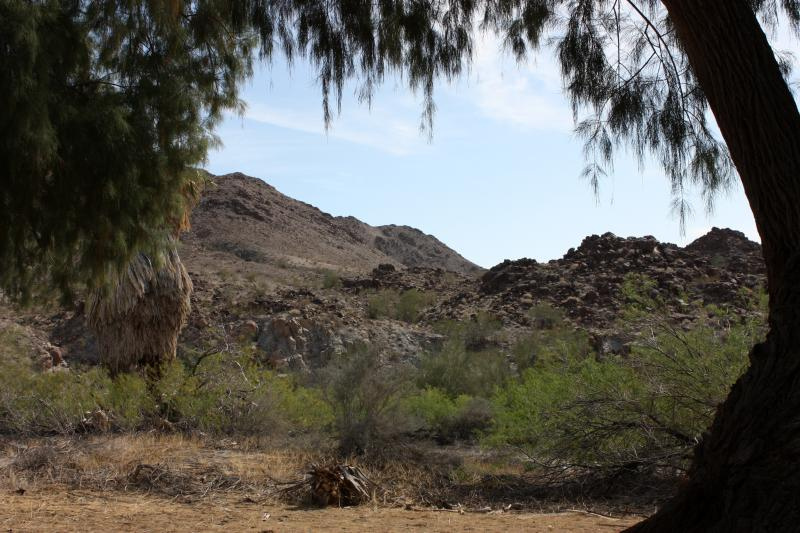
- Chuckwalla Mountains from Corn Springs

Highest point
- Elevation: 1,107 m (3,632 ft)

Geography
- Location within southern California Location within California Location within the United States
- Country: United States
- State: California
- District: Riverside County
- Range coordinates: 33°35′30.084″N 115°22′32.937″W
- Topo map: USGS Pilot Mountain

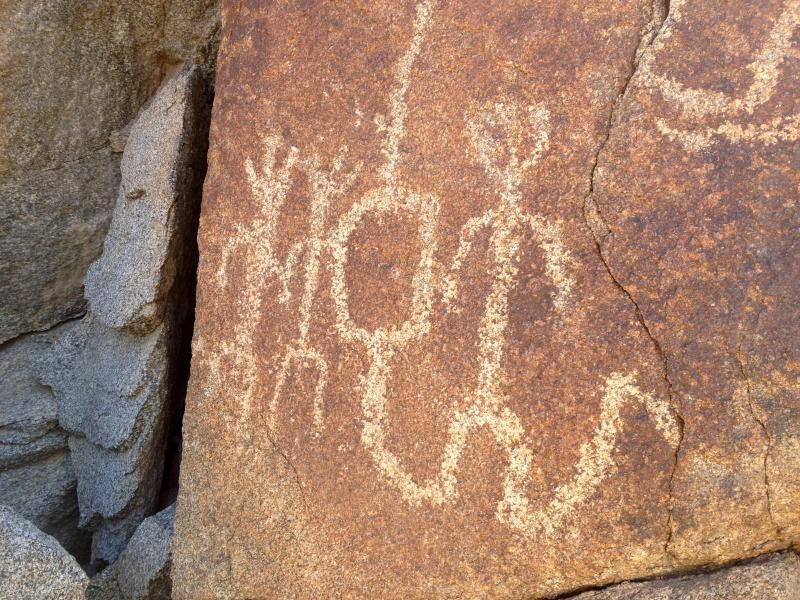
Corn Springs Rock Art, Chuckwalla Mountains

The Chuckwalla Mountains are a mountain range in the transition zone between the Colorado Desert—Sonoran Desert and the Mojave Desert, climatically and vegetationally, in Riverside County of southern California. The mountains are named after the chuckwalla lizards.

== Geography ==
The range spans about 40 miles (64 km), running in a generally northwest-southeast direction. It is bordered to the north by Interstate 10 and the town of Desert Center, and to the south by the Bradshaw Trail and the Chocolate Mountains Aerial Gunnery Range. The highest point is Black Butte, elevation 4,504 ft (1,373 m). The Chuckwalla Range is divided from the Little Chuckwalla Range by Graham Pass. The Orocopia Mountains are to the west, and Joshua Tree National Park is to the northwest.

== Chuckwalla Mountains Wilderness ==
Most of the mountains were designated by the Bureau of Land Management as the Chuckwalla Mountains Wilderness in 1994. Motorized travel is allowed only on "cherry-stemmed" established roads.

The Chuckwalla Mountains, near the San Andreas Fault, rise like an island from a vast sea of sand and rock; within the walls of this "rock fortress" is a variety of landforms, textures, and colors. They include steep-walled canyons, inland valleys, large and small washes, isolated rock outcrops, and panoramic expanses of desert.

=== Flora and fauna ===
The Chuckwalla Mountains are in the Colorado Desert section of the Sonoran Desert, adjacent to the Lower Colorado River Valley region. Plants include ocotillo, cholla, yucca, creosote, and barrel and foxtail cacti.

On the southern flank of the range lies the Chuckwalla Bench bajada region, an Area of Critical Environmental Concern, as it is frequented by the threatened desert tortoise. Also common in the area are the rosy boa, kangaroo rat, and the large lizard, after which the mountains are named - the chuckwalla. Other wildlife includes bighorn sheep, burro deer, raptors, snakes, coyotes, and foxes.

In the Chuckwalla Mountains, naturalist Edmund C. Jaeger discovered the hibernating common poorwill. (After his death in 1983, Jaeger's cremated remains were scattered in the same canyon.) The location is now preserved as the Edmund C. Jaeger Nature Sanctuary.

== History ==
The Chuckwalla Mountains have had many visitors over the millennia, as they are situated near heavily traveled east-west routes and feature several sources of water, the most prominent being Corn Springs. Several successful mines have been dug, including the Red Cloud, Aztec, and Granite.

Friar Francisco Garcés, traveling north on the Colorado River reached the Pools of Tesquien today known as Chuckwalla Springs on February 28, 1776 on an expedition to the San Gabriel Mission near Los Angeles from Tucson, possibly by using the Halchidoma Trail. Garcés traveled around the Mojave Desert, eventually reaching his destination through the Cajon Pass/Mojave Trail.

== See also ==
- List of Sonoran Desert wildflowers
