= Orocopia Mountains =

Mountain range of the Transverse Ranges in California, United States

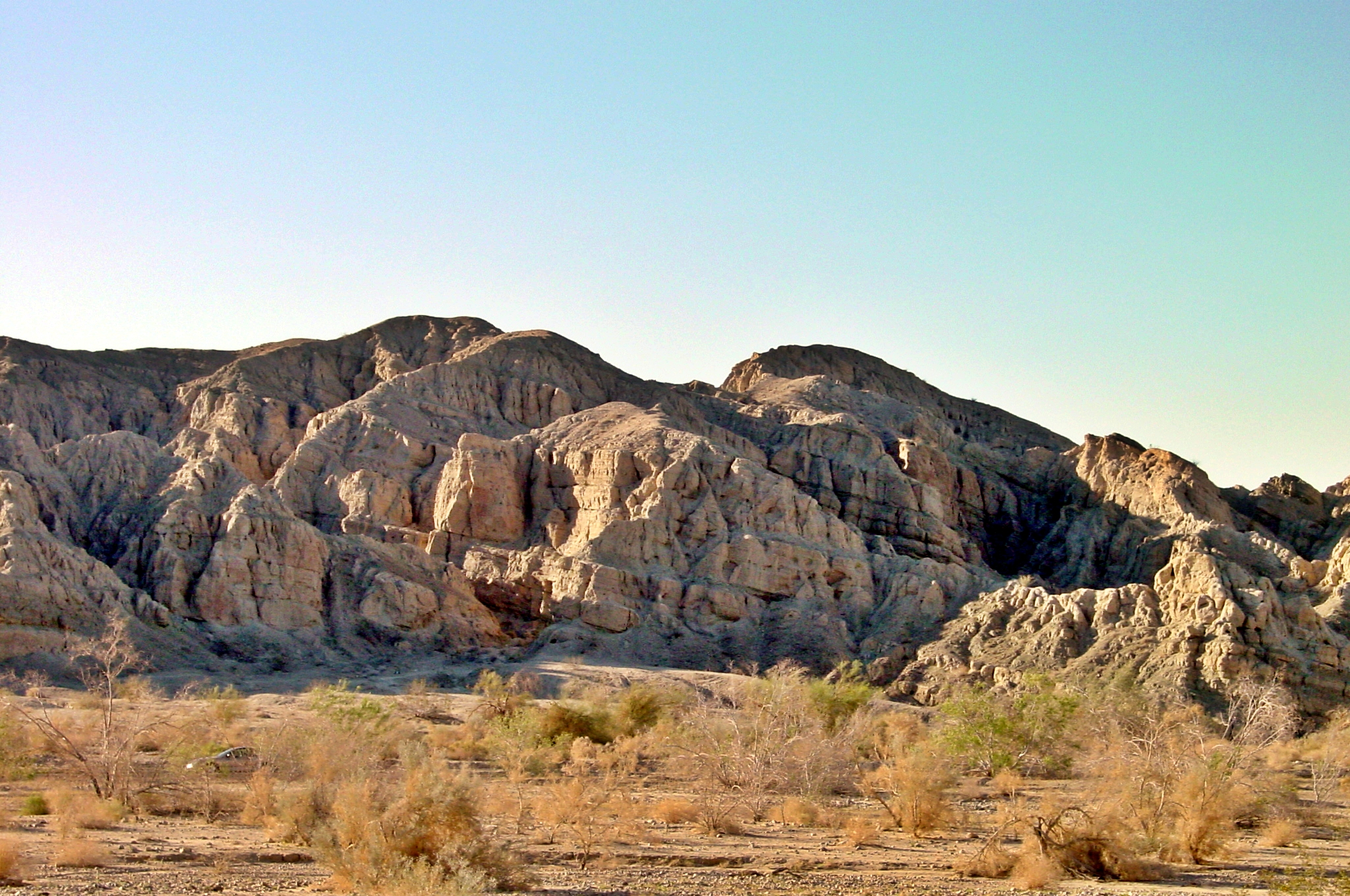
- Orocopia Mountains

Highest point
- Elevation: 1,117 m (3,665 ft)

Geography
- Location within California
- Country: United States
- State: California
- District: Riverside County
- Range coordinates: 33°34′00″N 115°46′33″W
- Topo map: USGS Orocopia Canyon

The Orocopia Mountains are located in Riverside County in southern California, United States, east of the Coachella Valley, west of the Chuckwalla Mountains, and south of Interstate 10 in the Colorado Desert. The range lies in an east-west direction, and is approximately 18 miles long. The Orocopia Mountains are north of and overlooking the Salton Sea and south of Joshua Tree National Park, with the Chocolate Mountains to the southeast and the scenic Mecca Hills just northwest.

== Orocopia Mountains Wilderness ==
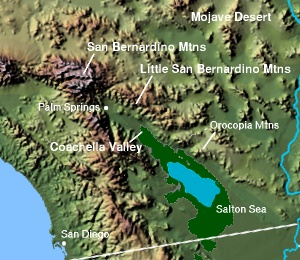
Location of the Orocopia Mountains

The area is the Bureau of Land Management (BLM) designated and managed Orocopia Mountains Wilderness. The Orocopia Mountains are in the Colorado Desert section of the Sonoran Desert, adjacent to the Lower Colorado River Valley region. Just to the north is the Mecca Hills Wilderness Area.

=== Flora and fauna ===
The Wilderness Area includes some remnant natural spring fed oasis with the only California native palm, Washingtonia filifera or the California Fan Palm.

== History ==
The Bradshaw Trail passed through the south eastern foothills of the mountain, the first recorded route from San Bernardino Valley to the Colorado River.

=== Geology ===
The dramatic and variable terrain was shaped primarily by movements of the adjacent San Andreas Fault over millennia. Most notably, the Orocopia schist, a blueschist assemblage found in the range, matches the Pelona schist found over 250 km away in the San Gabriel Mountains along the San Andreas fault. Hill and Dibblee (1953) first noted this similarity (a piercing point), and used it to construct the first estimates of the offset on the fault.

=== Astronaut training ===
The Orocopia Mountains offer considerable geologic variety and was one of the areas used for geologic field training by Caltech Professor of Geology, Leon T. Silver, for astronauts in preparation for the NASA Project Apollo Moon landing missions. This training included:

- Apollo 13 Crew Training: September 1969: Astronauts Lovell, Haise and Swigert
- Apollo 14 crew did not train with Dr. Leon “Lee” Silver, they trained with Richard Henry Jahns, a Professor at Stanford at the time.
- Apollo 15 Crew Training: June 1970: Astronauts Scott, Irwin and Worden
- Apollo 16 Crew Training: April 1972: Astronauts Young, Mattingly and Duke
- Apollo 17 Crew Training: December 1972: Astronauts Cernan, Evans and Schmitt

== See also ==
- List of Sonoran Desert wildflowers
