= Picacho Peak Wilderness =

Protected wilderness area in California, United States

Coordinates: 33°01′N 114°44′W

- IUCN category Ib (wilderness area)
- Interactive map of Picacho Peak Wilderness
- Location: Imperial County, California, United States
- Established: 1994

Picacho Peak Wilderness is a U.S. wilderness area located on nearly 9,000 acres (3,600 ha) of desert land in Imperial County, California, just west of the Arizona state line. The wilderness area is managed by the Bureau of Land Management.
