= Coachella Valley =

Valley in Southern California

- Valle de Coachella (Spanish)
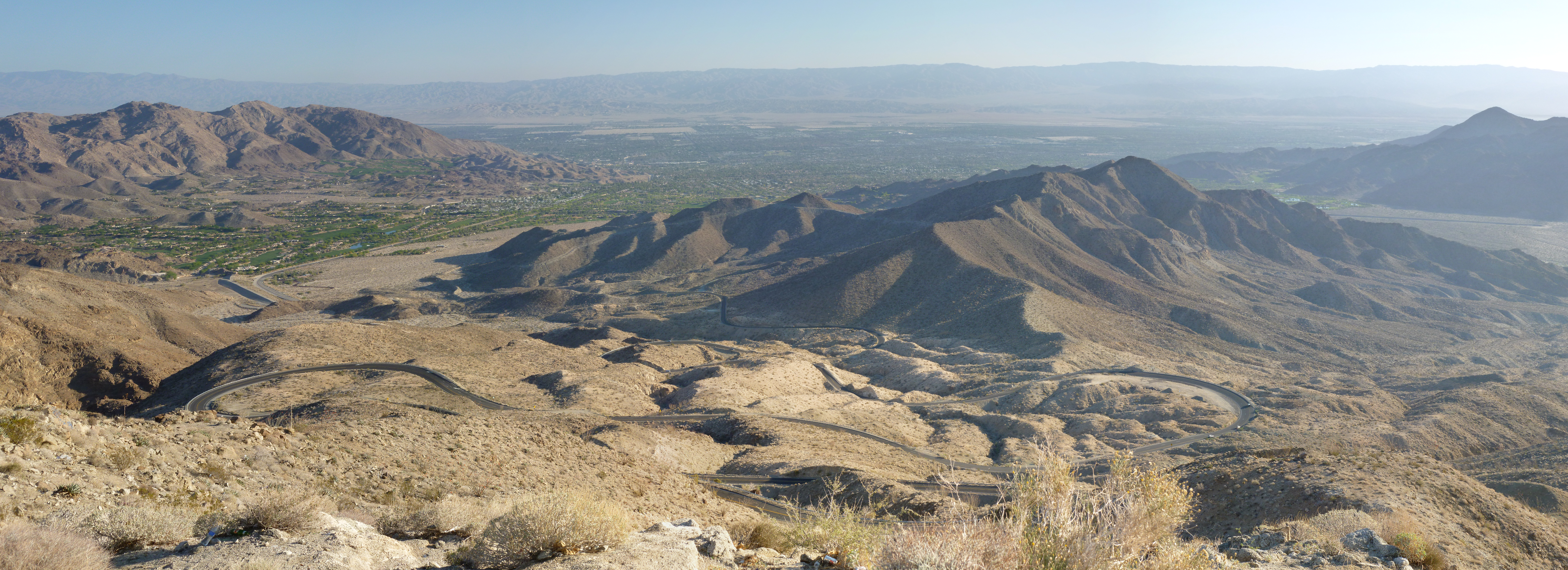
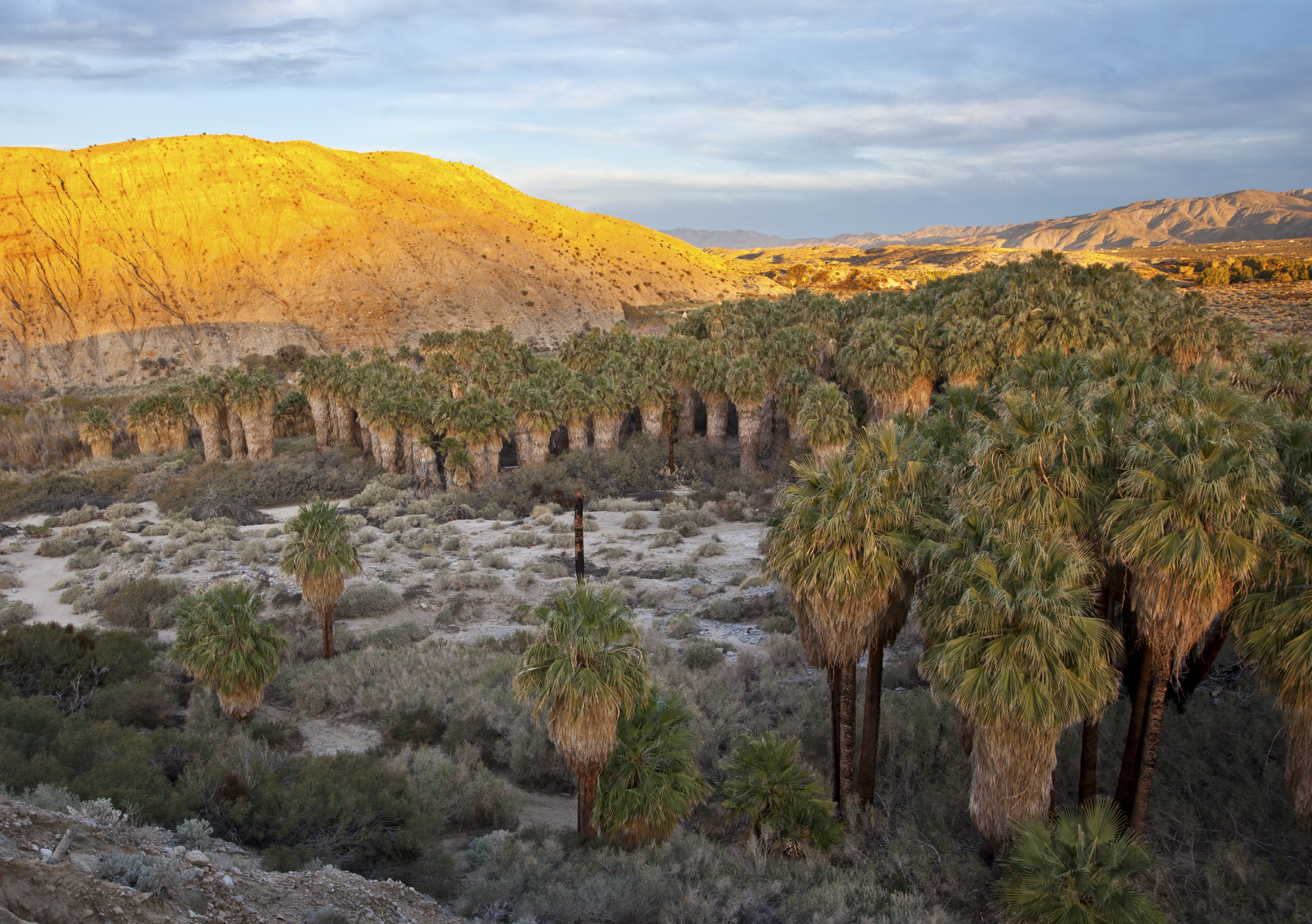
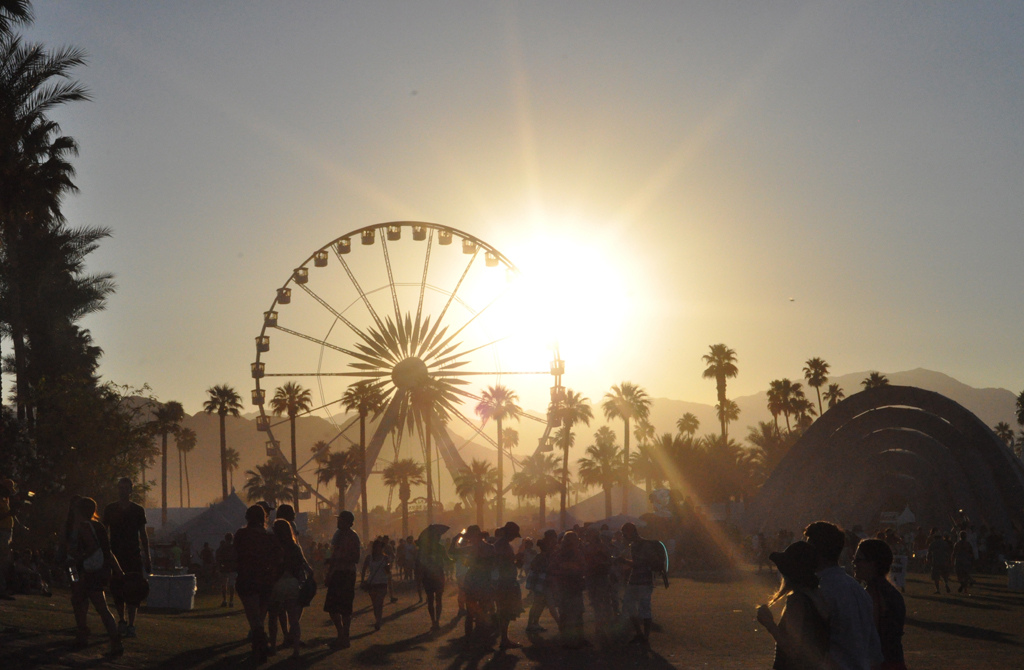
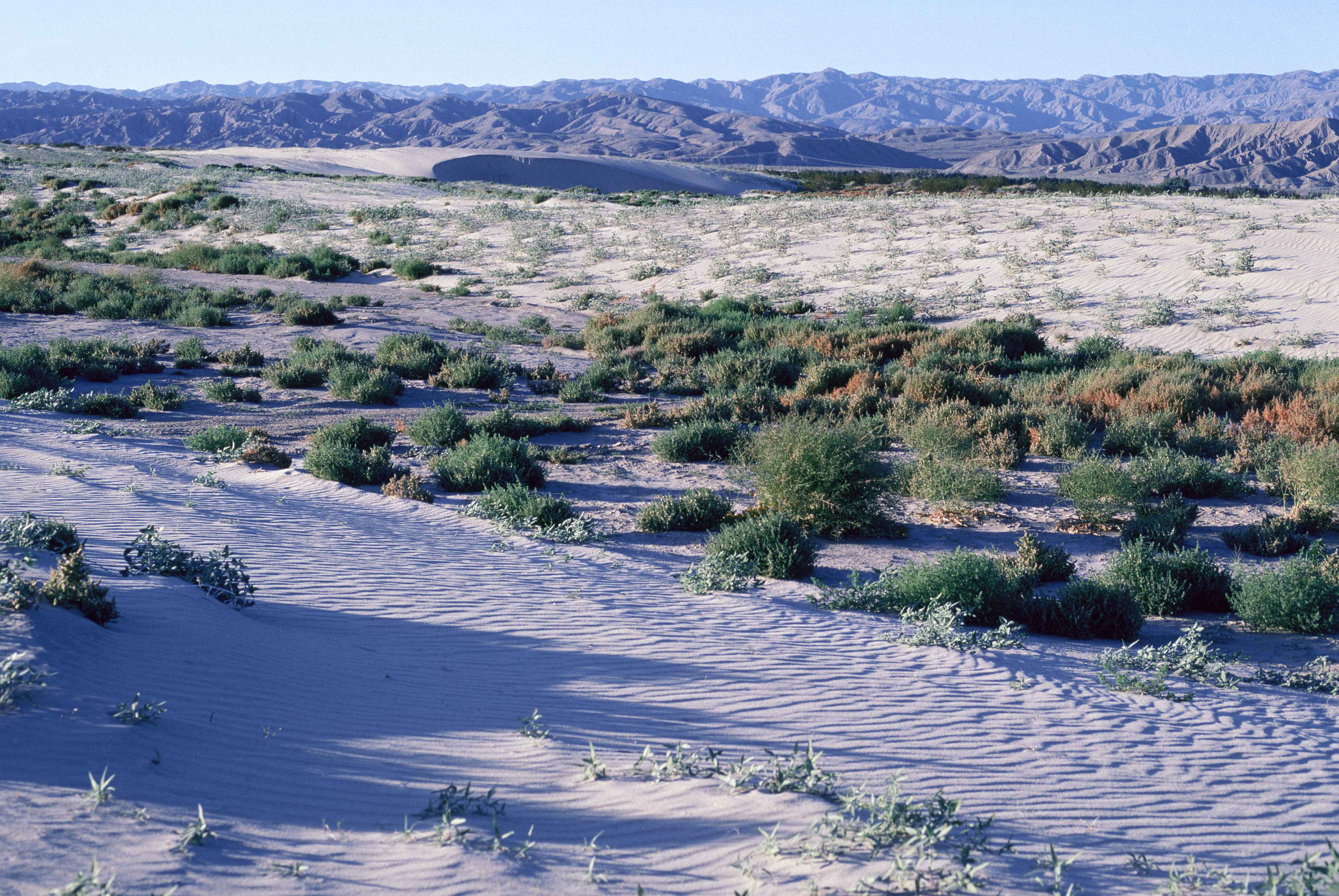
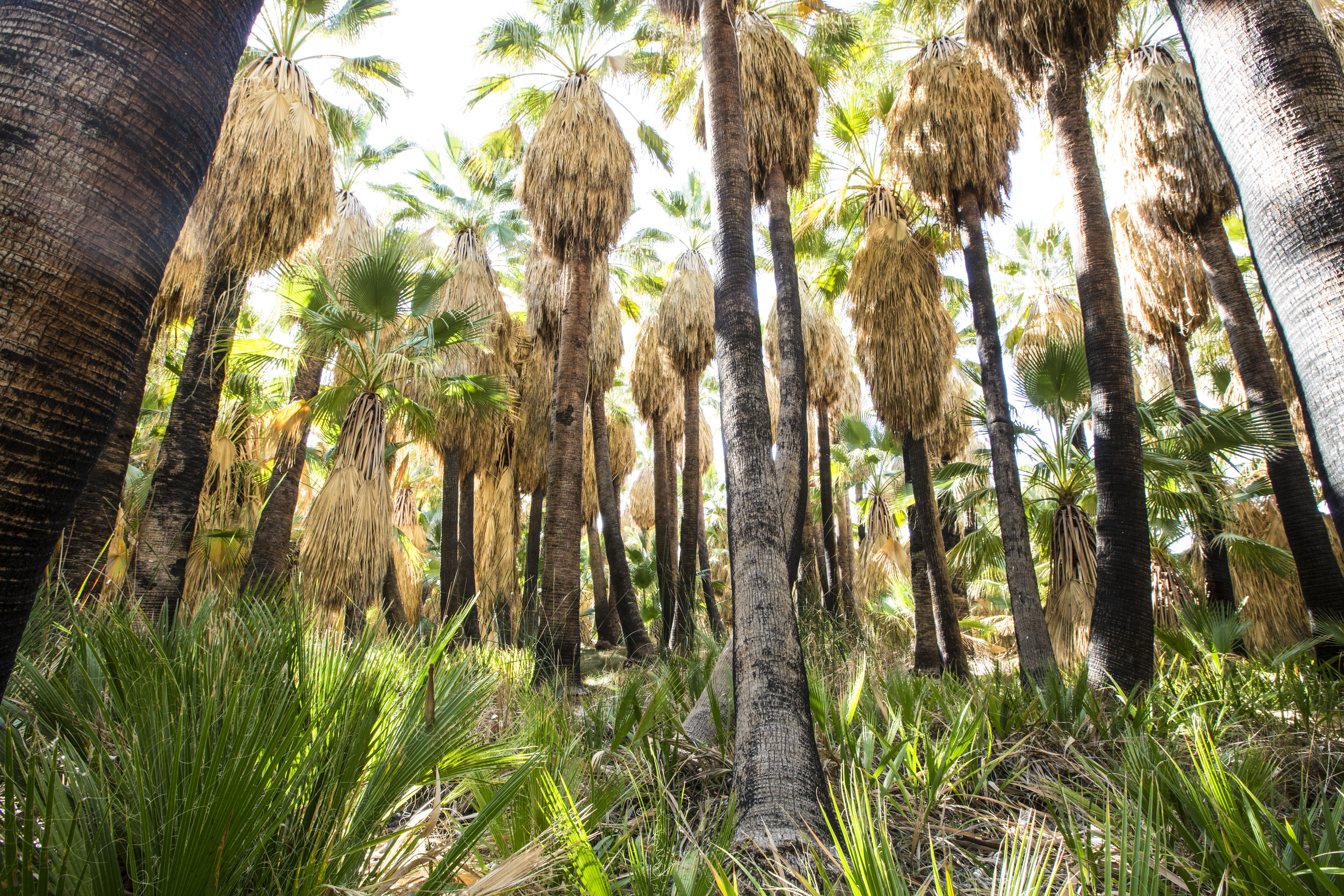
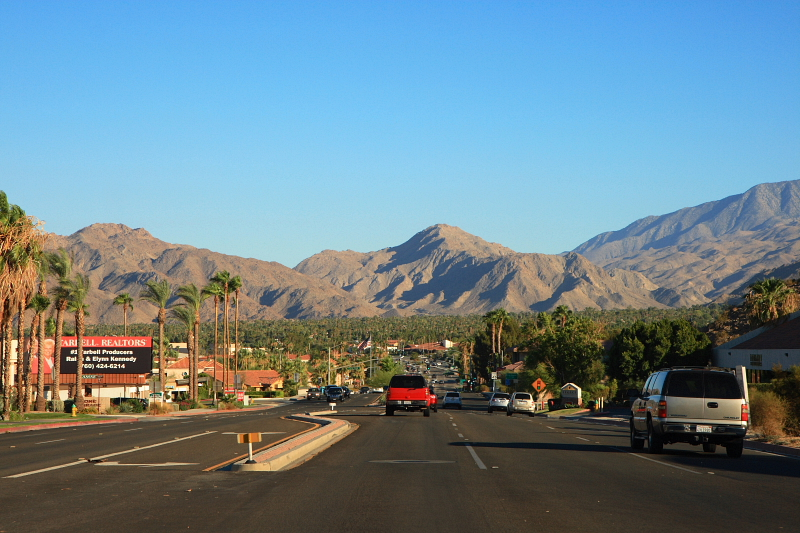
- Coachella Valley as viewed from San Jacinto Mountain, Coachella Valley Preserve, Coachella Music Festival in Indio, Valley Desert Floor in Eastern Coachella Valley, Dos Palmas Preserve , and SR 111 in Cathedral City.

- Location within southern California Location within California Location within the United States

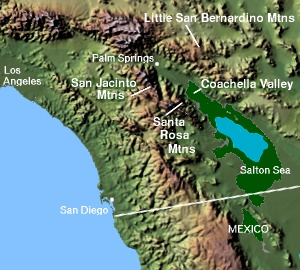
- Coachella Valley
- Floor elevation: −250 to 1,600 ft (−76 to 488 m)
- Long-axis direction: northwest to southeast
- Width: 15 miles (24 km)
- Area: 150 square miles (400 km^{2})

Naming
- Native name: El Valle de la Palma de Dios (Spanish)

Geography
- Location: Riverside County, California U.S.
- Population centers: Indio, Palm Springs, Palm Desert
- Borders on: Salton Sea (southeast), Santa Rosa Mountains (southwest), San Jacinto Mountains (west), Little San Bernardino Mountains (east), San Gorgonio Mountain (north)
- Coordinates: 33.766690°N 116.359176°W
- Mountain range: Indio Hills, Mecca Hills
- Traversed by: Interstate 10, SR 86, SR 111
- Rivers: White Water River

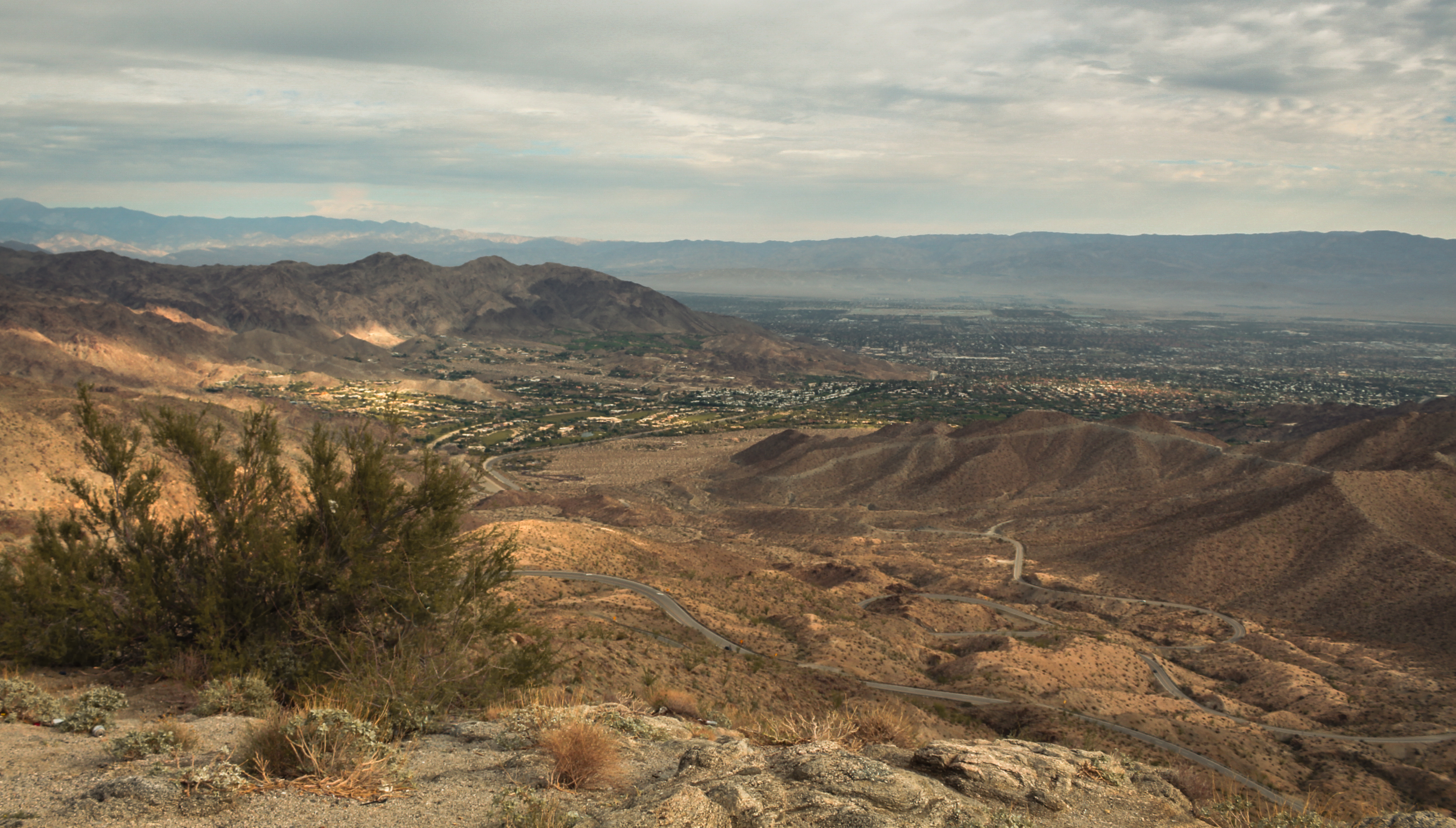
A sweeping view of the Coachella valley from an overlook in the Santa Rosa mountains.

The Coachella Valley (/koʊˈtʃɛlə, ˌkoʊ.ə-/ koh-CHEL-ə, KOH-ə-) is an arid rift valley in the Colorado Desert of Southern California, United States. The valley has been referred to as Greater Palm Springs and occasionally the Palm Springs Area due to the historic prominence of the city of Palm Springs. The valley extends approximately 45 mi (72 km) southeast from the San Gorgonio Pass to the northern shore of the Salton Sea and the neighboring Imperial Valley, and is approximately 15 mi (24 km) wide along most of its length. It is bounded on the northeast by the San Bernardino and Little San Bernardino Mountains, and on the southwest by the San Jacinto and Santa Rosa Mountains.

The Coachella Valley is notable as the location of several wintertime resort cities that have become popular destinations for full time retirees and seasonal residents known as snowbirds. The valley is also known for a number of annual events, including the Coachella Valley Music and Arts Festival, the Stagecoach Country Music Festival, and the Riverside County Fair and National Date Festival, all held in Indio. Other events include the Palm Springs Modernism Week, Palm Springs International Film Festival, the ANA Inspiration and Desert Classic golf tournaments, and the Indian Wells Open tennis tournament.

Cities in the Coachella Valley include but are not limited to: Cathedral City, Coachella, Desert Hot Springs, Indian Wells, Indio, La Quinta, Palm Desert, Palm Springs, Rancho Mirage, Mecca and Salton City; with the Northernmost city being Desert Hot Springs and the southernmost city being Salton City.

Summers in the valley are extremely hot and valley winters are mild. As such, the valley's population tends to fluctuate; from nearly 500,000 in April, to around 300,000 in July and August, to around 600,000 by January. It was stated in 2013 by the Riverside County HR Department that "Palm Springs and the Desert Communities" were being visited by 3.5 million conventioneers and tourists annually.

The Coachella Valley connects with the Greater Los Angeles area to the west via the San Gorgonio Pass, a major transportation corridor, traversed by Interstate 10 and by the Union Pacific Railroad. The valley is considered part of the Low Desert and is included within the Desert Empire to differentiate it from the broader Inland Empire of Southern California.

== History ==
The first inhabitants of the Coachella Valley were the Cahuilla Native American Peoples who have resided in the area for thousands of years. they set up villages throughout the valley floor such as Palm Springs, Martinez, Indian Wells, Torres, Fish Springs, Dos Palmas, and many more lost to time. The Cahuillas would travel the entirety of the valley from San Gorgonio Pass to Dos Palmas via an ancient trail known as the Cahuilla-Halchidhoma Trail. This prehistoric trail was later used by Mexican and American explorers.

Legend says In 1615, Juan de Iturbe, a Spanish explorer, set sail from Acapulco and headed north along the Sea of Cortez. He eventually reached the ancient Lake Cahuilla, which at the time was connected to the Sea of Cortez and was also its northernmost point. There, his ship became beached in the shallow waters, and his precious cargo of black pearls was lost forever in the vast desert. The legend of his lost treasure gained attention after the Great Flood of 1862, when locals reported seeing the outline of an ancient Spanish Galleon nearby in the Salton salt marshes in the southern limit of the Valley.

In December 1540 Spanish soldiers led by Melchior Diaz first arrived in the Colorado Desert searching for a land route to the Pacific Coast, it's unsuccessful after Diaz mortally wounded himself. 235 years later on Christmas Eve in 1775, Cahuilla Natives encountered a Spanish colonization party and share a camp with Juan Bautista de Anza in both events the explorer's party traversed through the Imperial Valley the area immediately south of Coachella Valley. For many years the Coachella Valley is left undiscovered by Europeans due to Algodones Dunes forming a natural barrier, but primarily for the existence of the Anza Trail that the Spanish take from San Diego down to the Colorado Desert to reach the Province of Sonora. Hostile Yuman Tribes on the Yuma Crossing however attacked and massacred 50 Spanish in July 1781. This closed the Anza Trail and severed California's land communication from New Spain reducing it to communication by sea

Beginning in 1815, Spanish missions throughout Alta California collectively recruited soldiers to begin a long journey from the Pueblo of Los Angeles to collect salt from brine pools at the Salton sink known as the evaporating ancient Lake Cahuilla. The Spanish would collect salt near the Salton salt marshes. This practice went on yearly until the 1830s; the salt journeys were referenced at the time as Jornadas de Sal.

=== Romero Expedition ===
In September 1822, forty-one years after the Closure of the Anza Trail, California has now become a part of the Mexican Empire and the emperor gives a royal decree that a land route be restored between the Mexican Empire and California. The year prior in 1821 a Gila River Native named Jose Cocomaricopa arrived at San Gabriel Mission to open trade with the Mexicans. He surprises officials with a courier letter from a Military Officer in the Presidio of Tucson. The Mexicans tell him to go back home to the Gila River, they are perplexed on how he appeared at San Gabriel first rather than San Diego which is customary on the Anza Trail. lieutenant José María Estudillo supervising his departure writes down the route Jose the native took back into the Colorado Desert via the San Gorgonio Pass at the frontier of the Californian province.

In December 1823, Governor Luis Antonio Argüello dispatched Captain José Romero and Lieutenant José María Estudillo to lead the first recorded expedition into the Coachella Valley. The Mexicans were attempting to reopen a northern undiscovered route to Tucson reestablishing land route connection to Sonora. They were escorted by the amicable Cahuilla via Cahuilla-Halchidhoma Trail to Dos Palmas, reaching it on December 30, 1823. They agreed the trail should only be used as a courier mail route due to the rough terrain and opted to use the Southern Anza Trail as the preferred traveling route after peace talks with the Yuma tribes. In the following years, the Mexicans used the Cahuilla-Halchidhoma trail as a mail route from California to Sonora, although it was used sporadically.

In January 1847 California is acquired by the United States

==== 1850s ====
In 1850, an American immigrant wagon train heading west from Iowa, led by Isaac W. Smith, entered California, the Union's newest state, via the Yuma Crossing. Smith reaches Dos Palmas via Algodones Dunes and uses the Cahuilla Trail into San Gorgonio Pass.

In December 1853 Lieutenant Robert S. Williamson conducted a survey for the Pacific Railroad they survey the San Gorgonio pass and travel into the Coachella valley using the Cahuilla trail.

A survey of the area was compiled by Edward Fitzgerald Beale in 1857, whose survey party used camels to cross the desert, primarily along the path of the Cahuilla trail. The Mountain band of Cahuillas offered protection to Beale's party from Ute warriors

=== The Bradshaw Trail ===
==== 1860s ====
In early March 1862, during the early stages of the American Civil War, Company A of the 1st California Cavalry the vanguard unit for the California Column marched through the Coachella Valley on their way to contest enemy presence in the Arizona Territory. The Company was involved in two battles along the way through Arizona.

In June 1862, William D. Bradshaw connected La Paz Gold mines to Los Angeles using the prehistoric Indian Cahuilla-Halchidhoma Trail shown to him by Cahuillas and a Cocomaricopa. Bradshaw renamed it the Bradshaw Trail. This trail was used by many travelers traversing from Arizona to California. The railroad would eventually replace the stagecoach trail.

In early 1863 Cahuillas have a massive die off during a winter smallpox epidemic claiming 80% of their Population. Chief Juan Antonio dies during the plague.

==== 1870s ====
On December 27, 1875, US President Ulysses S. Grant signed an executive order forming 13 Indian reservations in the Southern California Area. The Cahuillas had their land divided, and reservations were established across the Valley

During 1876, In need of a halfway point between Los Angeles and Yuma, Arizona, the Southern Pacific arrives in what would become Indio, where it builds the craftsman-style Southern Pacific Depot station and hotel that became the center of social life in the area.

=== Southern Pacific Rail Road ===
==== 1880s ====
Southern Pacific constructed a railroad connecting Yuma to San Bernardino via the Coachella Valley. The railroad began construction in 1879 and was completed in 1883. During the construction, a handful of rail stations were established. The Train Stations were the catalyst that led to the first population centers of the valley

In 1889, the Railroad boom towns of Mecca and Thermal are built

In the same year of 1889, the Agua Caliente Band of Cahuilla Indians invited non-Natives to settle near their healing hot mineral spring. Following reports of the water's restorative qualities, the tribe and settlers entered into a three-year lease agreement to build a bathhouse over the site.

==== 1890s ====
In 1893 Riverside County is created and the Coachella Valley is in its immediate borders

=== Salton Sea ===
Salton Sea creation 1905-1907

==== 1900s ====
In 1900, Jason L. Rector became the valley's first recorded non-Native permanent resident In Coachella (originally called Woodspur) Alongside his brother Lon, he drilled a well at Grapefruit Boulevard and Fifth Street, tapping into a groundwater supply that turned the local landscape into productive farmland.

In 1903, Bernard Johnson introduced the first commercial Deglet Noor date shoots to the region by importing them from Algeria and planting them near Mecca. This established a thriving crop that continues to flourish in the Eastern Coachella Valley today.

From September 1905 to February 1907, the Colorado River overflowed into the Salton Sink, which had an ancient history of previous iterations of lakes. This time, the engineering disaster led to the creation of the modern Salton Sea.

In 1905, John Muir visits Palms Springs hoping the warm desert air cures his Daughter's respiratory illness, they camp for six days at Andreas Canyon.

In August 1907, the Martinez school built by Government was opened for the Martinez Village. It is currently the oldest standing US Indian Agency buildings still standing.

In 1909, the Desert Inn Is opened, it's originally a health sanatorium, for people seeking warm climates especially leukemia.

==== 1910s ====
In 1910, the valley hosted its first annual Date Festival to the residents

In 1912, the valley gets its first bank the "First National Bank" in the city of Coachella.

In May 1912, a violent melee broke out at the Cahuilla Reservation during which Federal Superintendent of the Mission Indian Agency William H. Stanley was fatally wounded. He died shortly after. The Cahuilla Tribesmen involved in the murder were sent to a federal penitentiary.

In 1914, electrical lines arrive from San Bernardino.

==== 1920s ====
Hollywood actors began vacationing in Palm Springs resorts from the time of the 1920s, and the area became synonymous with resort culture from that time reaching its heyday with mid-twentieth century celebrities including Frank Sinatra, Bob Hope, Dinah Shore, Marilyn Monroe, Gene Autry, amongst many others.

The coming in 1926 of U.S. Route 99 northward through Coachella and Indio and westward toward Los Angeles, more or less along the present route of Interstate 10, helped further open agriculture, commerce and tourism to the rest of the country. So too did the coming of State Highway 111 in the early 1930s, which cut a diagonal swath through the valley and connected all of its major settlements. Dr. June McCarroll, then a nurse with the Southern Pacific whose office fronted U.S. 99 in Indio, is credited with being the first person to delineate a divided highway by painting a stripe down the middle of the roadbed in response to frequent head-on collisions. The standard was refined and adopted worldwide. Doctor McCarroll is memorialized by a stretch of I-10 through Indio named in her honor.

==== 1930s ====
The first city incorporated was Indio in 1930.

Palm Springs is incorporated in 1938

==== 1940s ====
In 1942, the Desert Training Center began operation. It was established by Major General George S. Patton, Jr. in response to a need to train American combat troops for battle in North Africa during World War II. It covered 18,000 square miles (47,000 km2). It was the largest military training ground ever to exist. Over one million men were trained at the eleven sub-camps scattered throughout the California Desert. Thermal Army Air Field was the only installation located in the valley floor. Camp Young Headquarters was located just outside the valley behind Mecca Hills.

After the war, residential housing and business began to take foot with the remaining infrastructure.

==== 1950s ====
The early 1950s marked the rapid acceleration of resort and golf-country club expansion across the desert floor, setting the stage for future hubs like Palm Desert and Indian Wells

In 1951, Thunderbird Ranch in Rancho Mirage becomes the Valleys first 18-hole golf course.

In the 1950s The city of Coachella expanded significantly across 32 square miles of corporate farms, citrus groves, and date palm operations.

In 1956, Artist Carl G. Bray opened a prominent art gallery in Indian Wells, cementing the region's reputation as a haven for artists capturing unique desert scenery.

==== 1960s ====
By 1960, the Coachella Valley had a population of around 50,000 people.

In 1960, construction was started on the North Shore Beach & Yacht Club and the North Shore Motel, designed by Albert Frey. Both opened in 1962, and North Shore's marina was one of the largest in Southern California. For several years, North Shore was a popular place for celebrities like the Beach Boys, Jerry Lewis, Frank Sinatra, and others.

In 1961, Gene Autry brings the California Angels to Palm Springs as their spring training base. They stay for thirty years.

Developers promoted the Salton Sea as "California's inland sea" and a desert paradise. Annual visitors to the Salton Sea reached over 1.5 million, compared to Yosemite's roughly 1 million in the 1960s.

In 1963 the Palm Springs Aerial Tramway opened to the Public

In 1964, Palm Springs Municipal Airport begins its first commercial flights

In 1965 Mexican and Filipino farm workers launched a grape worker strike helping spark a movement and alliance with Cesar Chavez

In 1966, Sunnylands an estate is completed to house diplomats, they aim it to become the "Camp David of the West". 8 sitting US presidents visit the estate as well as foreign diplomats

==== 1970s ====
On September 7, 1976, Hurricane Kathleen caused widespread destruction across the Coachella Valley. This event and further floods significantly stalled progress in the Eastern Coachella Valley. Many residential development projects were abandoned.

==== 1980s ====
In 1984, Yolanda R. Coba was selected as mayor by the Coachella City Council, making her the first Latina mayor in the valley

On July 8, 1986, Palm Springs is struck by major earthquake injuring 29, and destroying 51 homes.

In 1988, McCallum Theatre opened in Palm Desert with a nationally televised star-studded tribute to Bob Hope.

In 1989, Palm Springs International Film Festival The renowned annual film festival was launched, helping put the region on the global arts map.

==== 1990s ====
In January 1992, Mexican recording artist Chalino Sanchez survived an assassination attempt during a live performance in the City of Coachella.

In 1998, State Voters pass Proposition 5 legalizing Native gambling on tribal reservations. Many casinos are prominent landmarks across the Valley floor.

In 1999, the inaugural Coachella Music Festival is held in Indio.

==== 2000s ====
In 2000 the Indian Wells Tennis Garden is inaugurated

==== 2010s ====
In 2017, the Salton Sea's shoreline began retreating more quickly, exposing additional lake bed around communities like North Shore. Air quality monitors and health studies document rising levels of PM10 and other dust in the Eastern Coachella Valley, with children in Mecca, North Shore, and nearby areas showing high asthma rates. Reports by state and university researchers highlight that the newly exposed lakebed is a major dust source, carrying salts and farm pollutants from decades of runoff.

==== 2020s ====
In 2020, COVID-19 affected the Valley's residents.

In 2022 the Valley secured an AHL pro hockey team, the Coachella Valley Firebirds, alongside a dedicated arena to house the team, the Acrisure Arena.

In 2025, the Los Angeles Lakers moved their G-League team from the South Bay to Coachella Valley. They begin their season in 2026.

== Geography ==
The Coachella Valley is the northernmost extent of the vast Salton Trough, also called the Cahuilla Basin, which includes the Salton Sea, and the Imperial Valley in the United States, as well as the Mexicali Valley and Colorado River Delta in Mexico. The trough is a result of combined tectonic activity of the San Andreas Fault, which follows the northeastern side of the valley, and the East Pacific Rise that runs up through the Gulf of California to the Salton Sea.

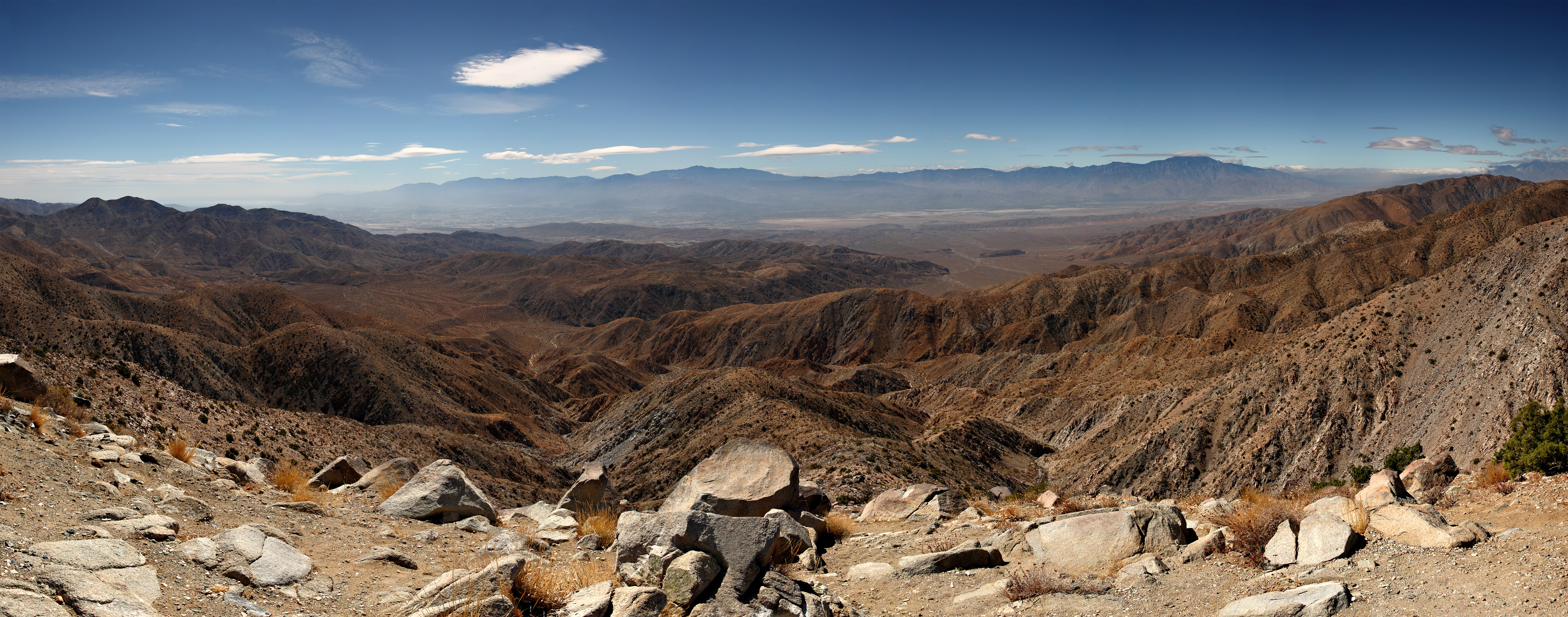
Panorama of the view south from Keys View in the Little San Bernardino Mountains, Joshua Tree National Park, California, United States. Visible landmarks are the Salton Sea, 230 feet (70 m) below sea level at rear left, along towards the center the Santa Rosa Mountains behind Indio and the San Jacinto Mountains behind Palm Springs. In the valley floor, the San Andreas Fault is clearly visible. At the rear right is the 11,500-foot-tall (3,500 m) San Gorgonio Mountain.

The area is surrounded on the southwest by the Santa Rosa Mountains, by the San Jacinto Mountains to the west, the Little San Bernardino Mountains to the east and San Gorgonio Mountain to the north. These mountains peak at around 11,000 feet (3,400 m) and tend to average between 5,000 and 7,000 feet (1,500 and 2,100 m). Elevations on the valley floor range from 1,600 feet (490 m) above sea level at the north end of the Valley to 250 feet (76 m) below sea level around Mecca.

The San Andreas Fault traverses the valley's east side. Because of this fault, the valley has many hot springs. The Santa Rosa Mountains to the west are part of the Elsinore Fault Zone. The results of a prehistoric sturzstrom can be seen in Martinez Canyon. The Painted Canyons of Mecca feature smaller faults as well as Precambrian, Tertiary and Quaternary rock formations, unconformities, badlands and desert landforms. Fault lines cause hot water springs or geysers to rise from the ground. These natural water sources made habitation and development possible in the otherwise inhospitable desert environment of the Coachella Valley. Major earthquakes have affected the Coachella Valley. For instance, the 1992 Landers earthquake caused some damage in the valley. An earthquake of local origin which caused considerable damage was the 1986 North Palm Springs earthquake, which registered at a magnitude of 6.0, injuring 29 people and destroying 51 homes.

=== Climate ===
In the summer months daytime temperatures range from 104 °F (40 °C) to 120 °F (49 °C) and nighttime lows from 75 °F (24 °C) to 86 °F (30 °C). During winter, the daytime temperatures range from 68 °F (20 °C) to 88 °F (31 °C) and corresponding nights range from 46 °F (8 °C) to 65 °F (18 °C) making it a popular winter resort destination. The surrounding mountains create Thermal Belts in the immediate foothills of the Coachella Valley, leading to higher night-time temperatures in the winter months, and lower daytime temps during the summer months. Due to its warm year-round climate the region's agricultural sector produces fruits such as mangoes, figs and dates.

The valley is the northwestern extension of the Sonoran Desert to the southeast, and as such, is extremely arid. Most precipitation falls during the winter months from passing mid-latitude frontal systems from the north and west, nearly all of it as rain, but with snow atop the surrounding mountains. Rain also falls during the summer months as surges of moisture from both the Gulf of Mexico and the Gulf of California are drawn into the area by the desert monsoon. Occasionally, the remnants of a Pacific tropical cyclone can also affect the valley. In 1976, Tropical Storm Kathleen brought torrential rain and catastrophic flooding to the Coachella Valley as it swept in from the Pacific, traversing the region from south to north. A haboob powerful enough to have a significant impact on the Coachella Valley can happen every two years.

Climate data for Palm Springs, CA (1991–2020 Normals)
Month	Jan	Feb	Mar	Apr	May	Jun	Jul	Aug	Sep	Oct	Nov	Dec	Year
Record high °F (°C)	95 (35)	99 (37)	104 (40)	112 (44)	116 (47)	123 (51)	124 (51)	123 (51)	121 (49)	116 (47)	102 (39)	93 (34)	123 (51)
Mean daily maximum °F (°C)	70.5 (21.4)	73.7 (23.2)	80.6 (27.0)	86.7 (30.4)	94.7 (34.8)	103.6 (39.8)	108.6 (42.6)	108.1 (42.3)	101.8 (38.8)	91.1 (32.8)	78.7 (25.9)	69.2 (20.7)	88.9 (31.6)
Daily mean °F (°C)	59.0 (15.0)	61.7 (16.5)	67.5 (19.7)	72.9 (22.7)	80.3 (26.8)	88.2 (31.2)	94.0 (34.4)	94.0 (34.4)	88.1 (31.2)	77.8 (25.4)	66.0 (18.9)	57.7 (14.3)	75.6 (24.2)
Mean daily minimum °F (°C)	47.6 (8.7)	49.7 (9.8)	54.4 (12.4)	59.1 (15.1)	65.9 (18.8)	72.7 (22.6)	79.4 (26.3)	79.8 (26.6)	74.4 (23.6)	64.5 (18.1)	53.4 (11.9)	46.2 (7.9)	62.3 (16.8)
Record low °F (°C)	19 (−7)	24 (−4)	29 (−2)	34 (1)	36 (2)	44 (7)	54 (12)	52 (11)	46 (8)	30 (−1)	23 (−5)	23 (−5)	19 (−7)
Average precipitation inches (mm)	1.16 (29)	1.16 (29)	0.49 (12)	0.05 (1.3)	0.02 (0.51)	0.02 (0.51)	0.14 (3.6)	0.29 (7.4)	0.22 (5.6)	0.20 (5.1)	0.38 (9.7)	0.70 (18)	4.83 (123)
Average precipitation days	3.8	3.5	2.4	0.7	0.4	0.2	0.7	1.1	1.0	0.8	1.0	2.6	18.2
Source: NOAA

Climate data for Boyd Deep Canyon Campground (1982–2012) Elev. 682 ft.
Month	Jan	Feb	Mar	Apr	May	Jun	Jul	Aug	Sep	Oct	Nov	Dec	Year
Mean daily maximum °F (°C)	69.8 (21.0)	72.1 (22.3)	78.6 (25.9)	85.3 (29.6)	93.4 (34.1)	101.7 (38.7)	105.6 (40.9)	104.5 (40.3)	99.5 (37.5)	89.4 (31.9)	77.4 (25.2)	68.2 (20.1)	87.1 (30.6)
Daily mean °F (°C)	59.7 (15.4)	61.7 (16.5)	66.7 (19.3)	72.1 (22.3)	79.1 (26.2)	86.7 (30.4)	92.3 (33.5)	91.6 (33.1)	86.9 (30.5)	77.9 (25.5)	66.8 (19.3)	59.3 (15.2)	75.0 (23.9)
Mean daily minimum °F (°C)	49.5 (9.7)	51.3 (10.7)	54.7 (12.6)	58.8 (14.9)	64.8 (18.2)	71.6 (22.0)	79.0 (26.1)	78.6 (25.9)	74.3 (23.5)	66.4 (19.1)	56.1 (13.4)	48.4 (9.1)	62.8 (17.1)
Average precipitation inches (mm)	0.68 (17)	0.80 (20)	0.40 (10)	0.07 (1.8)	0.04 (1.0)	0.01 (0.25)	0.29 (7.4)	0.48 (12)	0.37 (9.4)	0.21 (5.3)	0.29 (7.4)	0.61 (15)	4.20 (107)
Source: deepcanyon.ucnrs.org

Climate data for Indio, CA (Lower Valley)
Month	Jan	Feb	Mar	Apr	May	Jun	Jul	Aug	Sep	Oct	Nov	Dec	Year
Record high °F (°C)	97 (36)	100 (38)	103 (39)	109 (43)	117 (47)	123 (51)	125 (52)	121 (49)	122 (50)	115 (46)	101 (38)	93 (34)	125 (52)
Mean daily maximum °F (°C)	71.9 (22.2)	75.3 (24.1)	81.3 (27.4)	87.5 (30.8)	95.7 (35.4)	103.1 (39.5)	107.3 (41.8)	106.6 (41.4)	102.0 (38.9)	91.9 (33.3)	79.6 (26.4)	71.0 (21.7)	89.5 (31.9)
Daily mean °F (°C)	58.3 (14.6)	61.6 (16.4)	68.1 (20.1)	74.1 (23.4)	81.7 (27.6)	88.6 (31.4)	93.8 (34.3)	93.4 (34.1)	88.0 (31.1)	77.8 (25.4)	65.7 (18.7)	57.6 (14.2)	75.8 (24.3)
Mean daily minimum °F (°C)	44.6 (7.0)	48.0 (8.9)	54.8 (12.7)	60.7 (15.9)	67.7 (19.8)	74.2 (23.4)	80.3 (26.8)	80.3 (26.8)	74.0 (23.3)	63.7 (17.6)	51.8 (11.0)	44.2 (6.8)	62.1 (16.7)
Record low °F (°C)	13 (−11)	20 (−7)	25 (−4)	33 (1)	38 (3)	45 (7)	59 (15)	56 (13)	46 (8)	31 (−1)	23 (−5)	19 (−7)	13 (−11)
Average precipitation inches (mm)	0.56 (14)	0.64 (16)	0.43 (11)	0.05 (1.3)	0.07 (1.8)	0.01 (0.25)	0.04 (1.0)	0.54 (14)	0.04 (1.0)	0.26 (6.6)	0.18 (4.6)	0.62 (16)	3.44 (87)
Source: www.ncdc.noaa.gov

=== Ecology ===
This desert environment hosts a variety of flora and fauna, including the endangered California Fan Palm, Washingtonia filifera, Bighorn sheep inhabit the Santa Rosa and San Jacinto mountain ranges as well as the fringe-toed lizard, an indigenous desert reptile whose numbers are increasing under the U.S. Endangered Species Act. Desert wildlife in the Coachella Valley includes localized subspecies of ants, bats, beetles, blackbirds, bobcats, coyotes, fleas, foxes, gnats, gophers, hawks, horseflies, jackrabbits, kangaroo rats, mosquitoes, mountain lions, pigeons, quails, rattlesnakes, ravens, roaches, roadrunners, scorpions, spiders, termites, ticks, wasps, whip scorpions or "vinegaroons", and wildcats.

See also:

- Geography of the Colorado Desert
- Fauna of the Colorado Desert
- Sonoran Desert wildflowers
- Coachella Valley Jerusalem Cricket

== Demographics ==
As a retirement haven throughout the area's history, a large percentage of residents are age 65 or older. The valley has some of the densest concentrations of senior citizens in California with three of California's cities with the highest percentages of residents age 65 and older: Indian Wells, Rancho Mirage, and Palm Desert. Though the area is somewhat politically conservative, it is also home to a sizeable LGBTQ population; current estimates are that up to 33% of Palm Springs' residents identify as gay and lesbian, and Cathedral City is also home to a number of gay resorts, bars, restaurants and clubs. Many establishments along a stretch of Arenas Road in downtown Palm Springs are gay-oriented and serve as the center of the annual White Party. According to an interview with former Palm Springs mayor Ron Oden, perhaps at the time the United States' only openly gay African-American mayor, a large number of people living with HIV have moved to the Palm Springs area to take advantage of the extensive health-support systems that have been developed in recent years (such as DAP Health). For this reason, the area has one of the highest per capita rates of HIV in the nation.

The Coachella Valley was settled by a diverse array of races and ethnicities. Once viewed as predominantly Caucasian, the Coachella Valley has features of a diverse history. A 2004 Claritas study found that 373,100 people resided in the region, with an overall racial makeup of 44.7% White, 49.9% Hispanic, 1.8% Black/African American, 2.1% Asian/Pacific Islander, 0.4% American Indian and Eskimo, 0.1% other, and 1.1% two or more races. A 2009 Market Street assessment placed the racial and ethnic makeup as 48% White, 48% Hispanic, 2% Black, and 2% other.

=== Cities and communities ===
The incorporated cities of the Coachella Valley had a population of approximately 370,000 at the 2020 Census. State projections estimate that the valley's population will pass 1 million by 2066. Demographers believe the total population already surpassed the 500,000 mark, plus 100,000 temporary seasonal residents known as "snowbirds" arriving to stay during the winter months (from the end of October to the end of April).

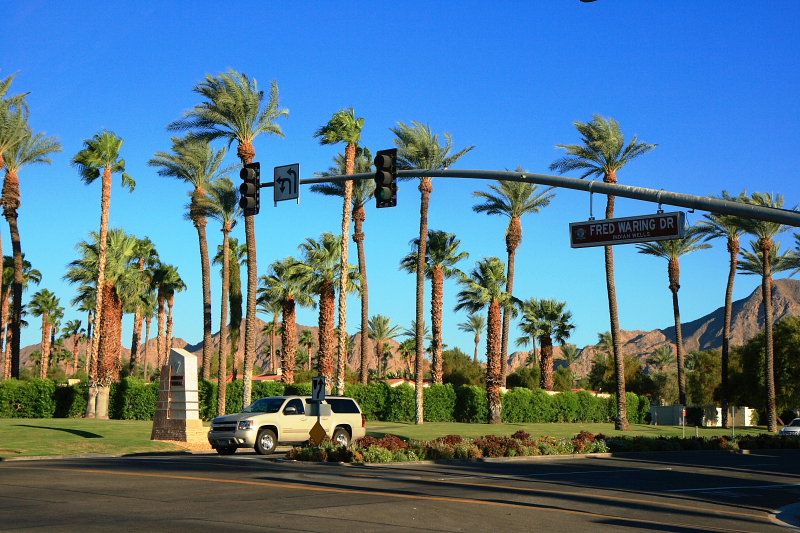
Palm Trees on Fred Waring Dr. in the city of Indian Wells

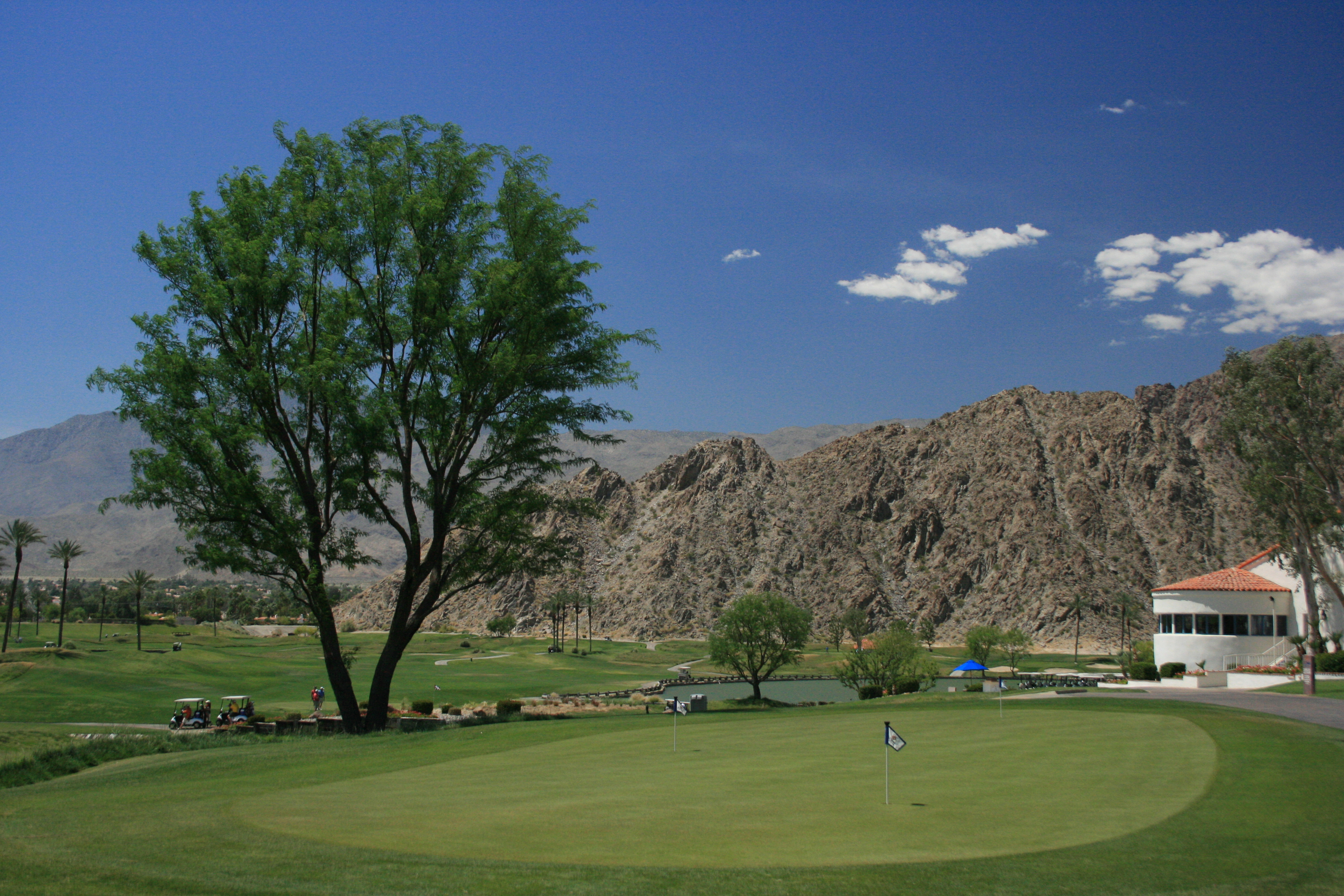
Country Club in La Quinta. Golf Communities are a common sight in the Affluent Western Coachella Valley.

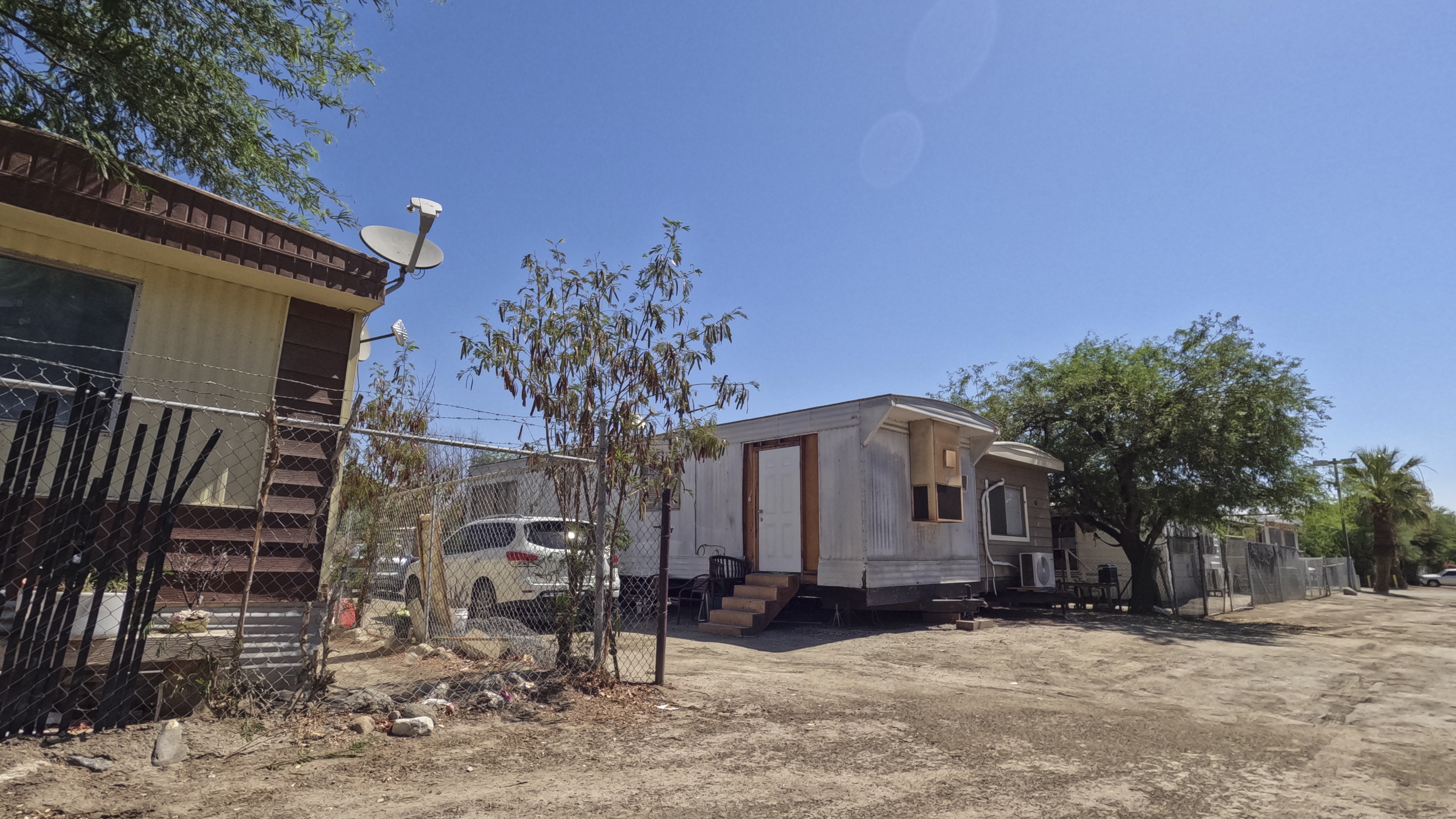
Thermal is a Rural Community in the Valley, surrounded by vast agricultural Fields.

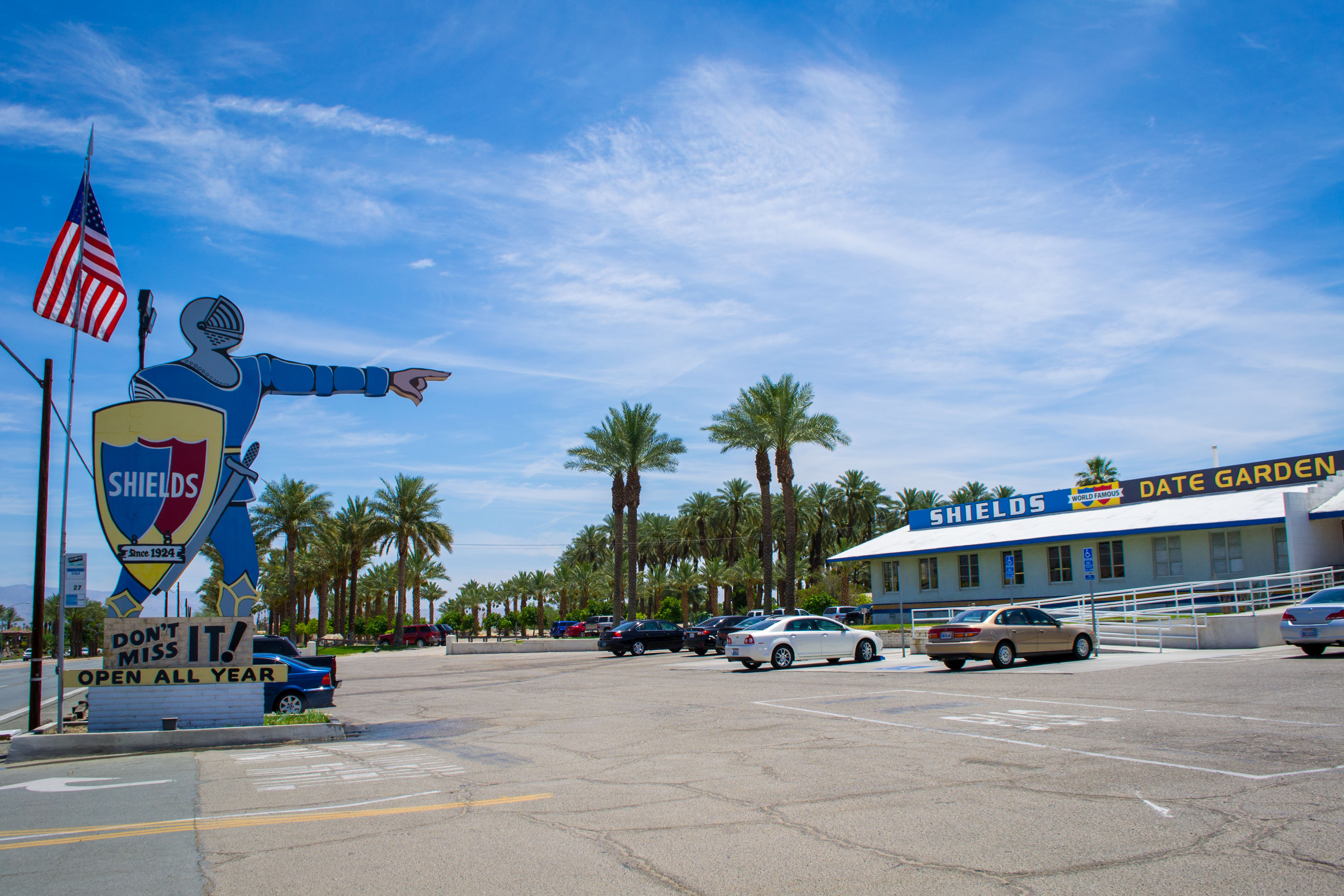
Shields Date Garden in Indio, a popular tourist stop for the valley's most unique crop, the Middle Eastern Date.

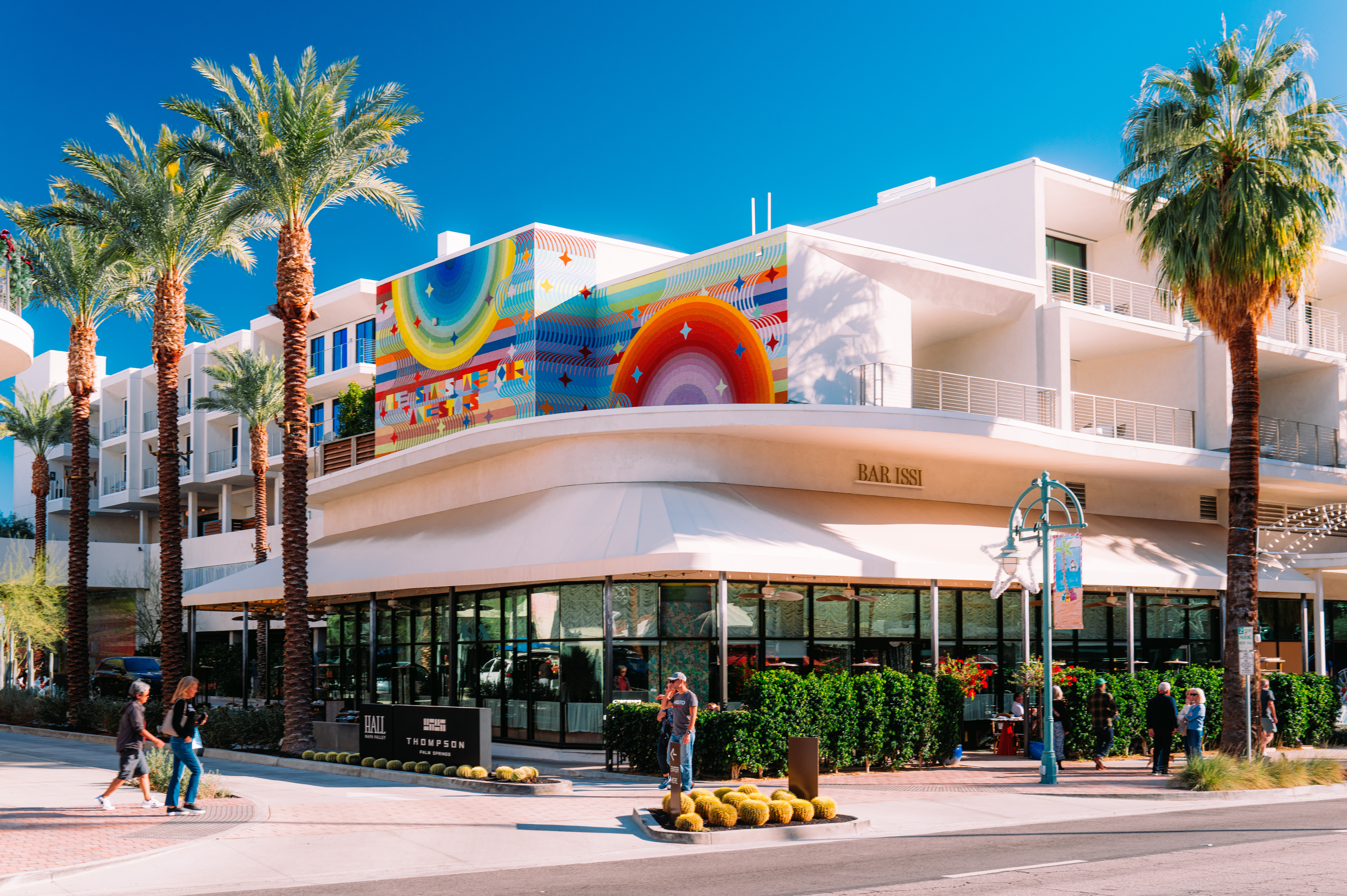
Downtown Palm Springs.

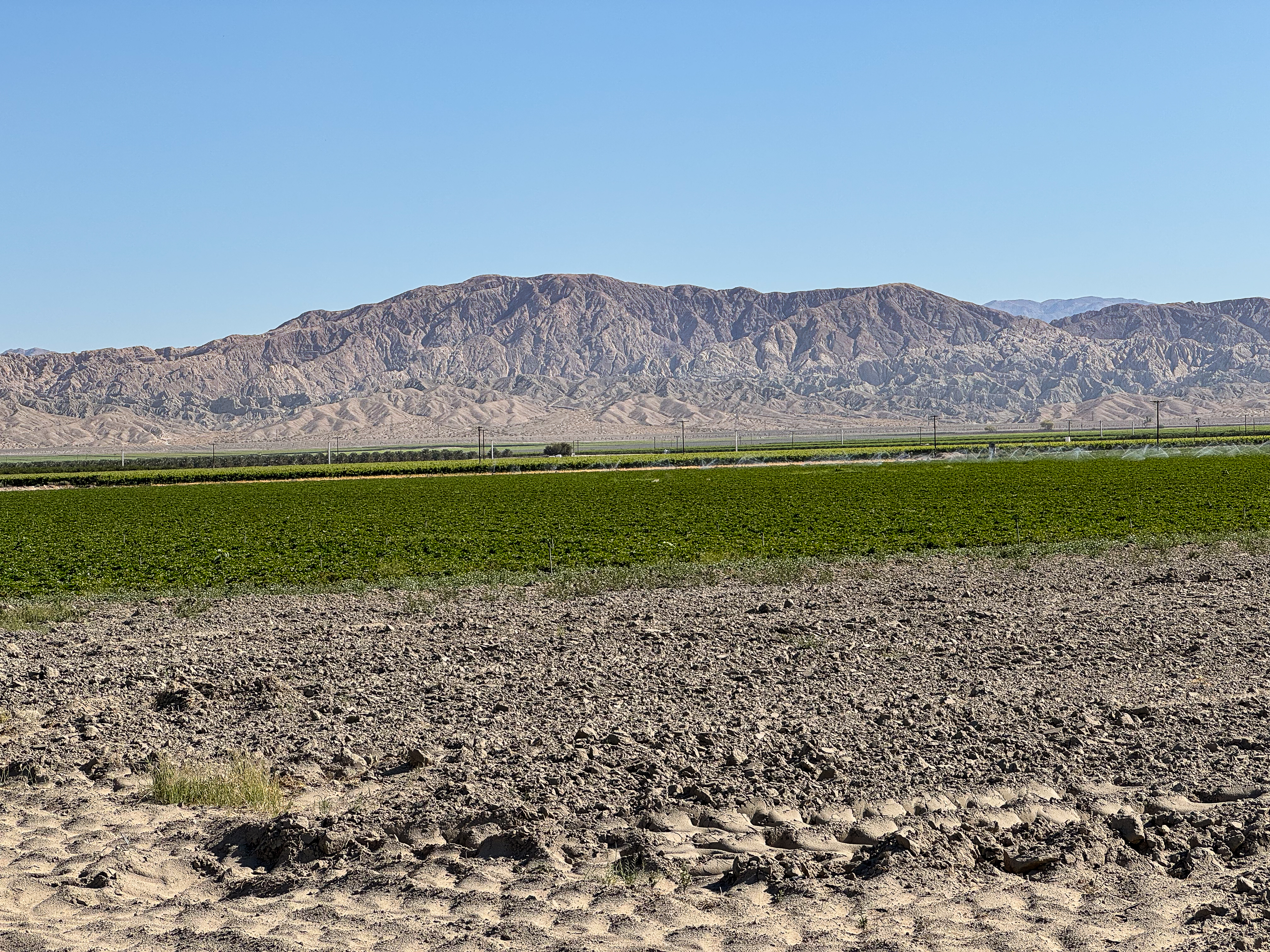
Agricultural Fields in the Eastern Coachella Valley, near Mecca.

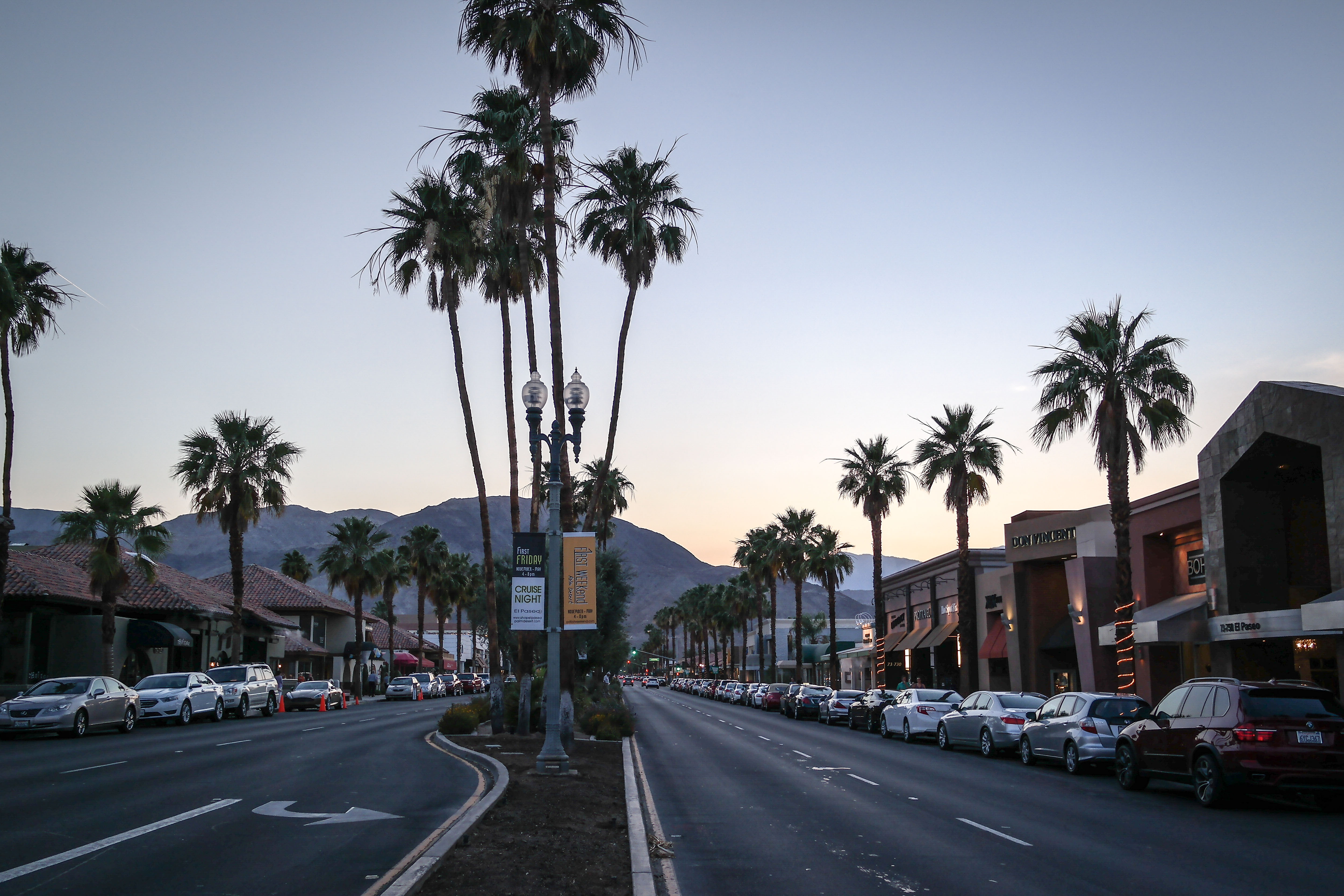
El Paseo, a popular luxury shopping center located in Palm Desert.

Community	Type	Incorporated	Total population	ZIP Codes	Additional notes
Indio	Principal city	1930	89,137	92201-92203	Most populated city in the Valley
Palm Springs	Principal city	1938	44,575	92262-92264	Most well-known city in the Valley
Palm Desert	city	1973	51,163	92211, 92260	
Cathedral City	city	1981	51,493	92234	
Coachella	city	1946	41,941	92236	
La Quinta	city	1982	37,846	92253	
Desert Hot Springs	city	1963	32,512	92240, 92241	
Rancho Mirage	city	1973	16,999	92270	
Indian Wells	city	1967	4,757	92210	
Bermuda Dunes	Census-designated place		8,244	92203, 92234	
Mecca	Census-designated place		8,219	92254	Eastern Coachella Valley
Thousand Palms	Census-designated place		7,967	92276	
Garnet	Census-designated place		7,118	92240, 92262	
Desert Palms	Census-designated place		6,686	92211	
Oasis	Census-designated place		4,468	92274	Eastern Coachella Valley
Desert Edge	Census-designated place		4,180	92241	
North Shore	Census-designated place		3,600	92254	Eastern Coachella Valley
Thermal	Census-designated place		2,676	92274	Eastern Coachella Valley
Vista Santa Rosa	Census-designated place		2,607	92274	Eastern Coachella Valley
Sky Valley	Census-designated place		2,411	92241	
Indio Hills	Census-designated place		1,050	92241	
Disney Cotino	Unincorporated community			92270	est. 2025, Located in Rancho Mirage
North Palm Springs	Unincorporated community			92258	
B Bar H Ranch	Unincorporated community			92241	est. 1937, Located in South Garnet
Torres	Unincorporated community			92274	Historical Cahuilla Village (Eastern Coachella Valley)
Martinez	Unincorporated community			92274	Historical Cahuilla Village (Eastern Coachella Valley)
Windy Point	Unincorporated community			92262	located at the Eastern end of San Gorgonio Pass
Desert Camp	Unincorporated community			92254	located West of North Shore
Desert Beach	Unincorporated community			92254	est. 1930, located South of North Shore
Rimlon	Unincorporated community			92234	located in Cathedral City
Sandy Korner	Unincorporated community			92274	located near Thermal Airport
Valerie	Unincorporated community			92274	est. 1926, located in Northern Oasis
One Hundred Palms	Unincorporated community			92274	located in Northern Oasis
Dos Palmas	Ghost town			92254	former Stage wagon stop in the 1860's
Duroville	Ghost town			92274	destroyed in 2013, located in Eastern Coachella Valley
Agua Caliente Indian Reservation	Indian reservation				est. 1876, Agua Caliente Band of Cahuilla Indians
Cabazon Indian Reservation	Indian reservation				est. 1876, Cabazon Band of Cahuilla Indians
Augustine Indian Reservation	Indian reservation				est. 1891, Augustine Band of Cahuilla Indians
Torres-Martinez Indian Reservation	Indian reservation				est. 1876, Torres Martinez Desert Cahuilla Indians

=== 19th and 20th centuries ===
In the early 20th century, less than 1,000 full-time residents lived in the "village" of Palm Springs, surrounding farms and ranches, and on the Indian reservation. The 1930 U.S. census found less than half the Coachella Valley's population was "white", the rest were Mexicans especially in the eastern ends when traqueros arrived to maintain the area's railroads, and Native Americans of local tribes in what were then impoverished reservations.

Starting in the 1890s, there was a large Irish and Scottish presence in the region, after Palm Springs was an established agricultural colony called "Palm Valley" cofounded by Welwood Murray, a Scottish immigrant and John Guthrie McCallum, an American from the U.S. East Coast. The two men widely advertised the colony to settlers with an interest in a warm climate and the ideal winter residence.

=== Hispanic and Latino community ===
Hispanic and Latino Americans are long established in Palm Springs' central and eastern sections, and have constituted the majority of the populations of Indio and Coachella for many decades. In the 2000 U.S. census, about 35 percent of Coachella Valley residents were Latino. But according to the United States Hispanic Chamber of Commerce, an estimated half (50–60 percent) of the residents are Latino. A large portion of Latinos moving into the area are from the Los Angeles-Orange County and San Diego metro areas.

Most of the valley's Hispanics are Mexican from a multi-generational community (see Chicano), but Central American immigrants (especially in Indio and Cathedral City), Cuban Americans, Puerto Ricans, and South Americans are also numerous (esp. in Rancho Mirage and Palm Desert). Since the late 1980s, the large wave of immigration from neighboring Mexico has culturally impacted the Coachella Valley in many more ways than the rest of California or the country, but the national trend slowed down due to the late 2000s recession.

Most Hispanic immigrants came to obtain work in the area's year-round agriculture, but today many find employment in construction and home remodeling, the resort hospitality industry, landscaping firms, and retail.

=== Other racial/ethnic groups ===
The prominence of Native Americans of the Cahuilla tribe is represented in local life; because of casino gambling and land ownership, the majority of local tribal members (Cahuilla pertaining to the Agua Caliente band and the Cabazon/Twentynine Palms bands) are in upper-income brackets. According to the Southern California National Congress of American Indians, less than 5 percent of the area's residents are Native Americans.

African Americans are concentrated in Palm Springs' northern and eastern ends, as well as in small sections of Indio and Desert Hot Springs, but local African Americans live everywhere in middle-class and wealthy areas and comprise less than 5 percent of the local population. The area is home to 10,000 Indian Americans (mostly from Sri Lanka), descendants of agricultural workers in the 1930s and 1940s. Additionally, Palm Desert is the home of 1,000 Tahitians, a Pacific Islander people from French Polynesia.

Other ethnic groups in the area like Asian Americans (i.e. Chinese, Japanese and Filipinos), followed by a small wave of Armenians and Arabs (esp. Lebanese and Syrians) from the Middle East were involved in the area's agriculture in the early 1900s. In recent years, the area (especially Palm Desert and Palm Springs) became popular for Iranian, Israeli, East Indian, Yugoslav (Former) and Korean home buyers, with most purchasing increasingly high-valued properties for investment purposes.

=== Local emphasis of tolerance ===
In mid-2000, Palm Springs city officials and business leaders discussed making an unofficial declaration of Palm Springs as a "hate-free zone" as a sign of local pride to celebrate the city's tolerance (Palm Springs, especially in The Advocate magazine that caters to gay and lesbian readership, has voted it as one of the top five most popular world places for the gay/lesbian community) and multicultural diversity of the city's relaxed attitude regarding many races living close together. According to the Palm Springs Pride LGBT association poll and census data in 2010, an estimated 40–45 percent of Palm Springs' residents are thought to be LGBT and nearby Cathedral City is about one-quarter, each having above averages of LGBT people for a U.S. city.

=== Religious life ===
Many faiths and denominations are represented in the area. Protestants and Catholics are the most numerous. According to the Jewish Federation of the Desert based in Palm Springs, the Coachella Valley has one of California's largest Jewish communities, estimated at 35,000, a result of being a major retirement destination and connections to the Hollywood film industry. There has also been a sizable Latter-Day Saints community since the early 1900s, with three stakes, formerly branches, which experienced rapid growth. The Church of Jesus Christ of Latter-Day Saints form a large population in the Inland Empire and High Desert regions. The Islamic Society of the Coachella Valley has a mosque in the city of Coachella.

== Economy ==
=== Agriculture ===
The irrigation of over 100,000 acres (40,500 ha) of the Valley since the early 20th century has allowed widespread agriculture. In its 2006 annual report, the Coachella Valley Water District listed the year's total crop value at over $576 million or almost $12,000 per acre. As of 2010 the valley produced agricultural products worth about $600 million.

The valley is the primary date-growing region in the United States, responsible for nearly 95 percent of the nation's crop and is celebrated each year in Indio during the Riverside County Fair and National Date Festival. The earliest attempt at growing dates came about in 1890 when the United States Department of Agriculture (USDA) imported date palm shoots from Iraq and Egypt. Sixty-eight shoots were distributed across the Southwest U.S. in Las Cruces, New Mexico, Yuma, Arizona, Phoenix, Arizona, and several California cites: Indio, Pomona near Los Angeles, Tulare and National City near San Diego. The imports were almost all male seedlings and produced poor fruit. The Coachella Valley showed promise, so USDA horticulturist Bernard Johnson planted a number of shoots that he brought back from Algeria in September 1903. On his own initiative, Johnson imported more shoots from Algeria in 1908 and again in 1912. The area's entire date industry can be traced back to those original USDA experiments near present-day Mecca. Date palms were grown from present-day Cathedral City to the Salton Sea, but most date groves were overtaken by development by the 1990s. Today nearly all of the date groves are in the "East Valley" area south of Indio, near Coachella and east of La Quinta.

Other agricultural products cultivated in the Coachella Valley include fruits and vegetables, especially table grapes, citrus fruits such as lemons, limes, oranges and grapefruit; onions and leeks; and peppers. The valley floor served to grow bounties of alfalfa, artichokes, avocados, beans, beets, cabbage, carrots, corn, cotton, cucumbers, dandelions (salad greens), eggplant, figs, grains (i.e. barley, oats, rye and wheat; plus rice fields kept wet or moist in the Salton Sea area), hops, kohlrabi, lettuce, mangoes, nectarines and peaches, persimmons, plums and prunes, pomegranate, potatoes, radishes, spinach, strawberries, sugar cane, tomatoes, a variety of herbs and spices, and other vegetable crops. The Coachella grapefruit originated in the region. The city of Coachella is the primary shipping point for agricultural goods. Domesticated grasses, flowers and trees are widely grown for warm-weather or desert climates, and sold for use in golf courses and landscape.

Only 10 percent of the Coachella Valley residents were born/raised in the area, according to the 2000 census, a much lower percentage than found in most parts of the U.S. Agriculture is a founding block of the majority of the residents whose parents and grandparents came to the area as farmers and laborers transformed the eastern parts of the valley from a hot sandy desert into a fertile place with a year-round growing season. The Coachella Valley's agricultural development is due to irrigation: water was drawn from an underground aquifer created when the valley was under a fresh water lake in the last ice age (over 10,000 years ago); and from the Coachella Canal, a concrete-lined aqueduct built between 1938 and 1948 as a branch of the All-American Canal, which brings water from the Colorado River to the Valley. The Colorado River Aqueduct, which provides drinking water to Los Angeles and San Diego, crosses the northeast end of the Valley along the base of the Little San Bernardino Mountains (the Joshua Tree National Park). Recent growth of fish farming or aquaculture in Mecca near the Salton Sea brings new promise to the local economy, especially to efforts to restore the ailing ecology of the large saltwater lake.

=== Wind power ===
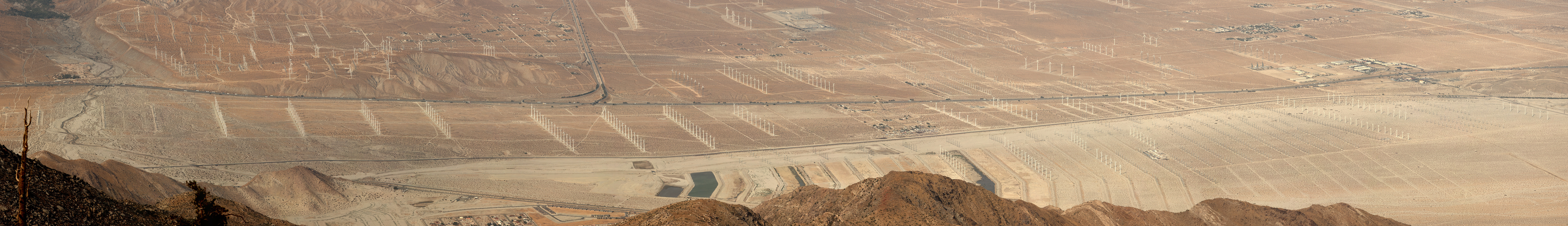
The San Gorgonio Pass Wind Farm as viewed from the top of the Palm Springs Aerial Tramway in the San Jacinto Mountains to the south

The valley's northwest entrance from the San Bernardino-Riverside along Interstate 10 is known as the San Gorgonio Pass and is the second windiest place in the country. Cool coastal air is forced through the pass and mixes with the hot desert air, making the San Gorgonio Pass one of only three ideal places in California for steady, wind-generated electricity. At the San Gorgonio Pass Wind Farm, thousands of huge wind turbines spread across the desert and hills on either side of the highway greet visitors as they approach the crest of the pass and have become somewhat of a symbol of the area. The state's other wind farms are in the Tehachapi Pass between Mojave and Bakersfield and in the Altamont Pass near Livermore.

=== Businesses ===
- Guthy-Renker, Palm Desert – producer of mail order infomercials.
- Ernie Ball, manufacturer of electric guitar strings, opened a manufacturing facility in Coachella in 2005.
- Shields Date Gardens, date producer – a local landmark and tourist attraction since 1924.
- Coca-Cola bottling plant facility in Coachella – opened in 2009 and employs 1,000 people.
- Eisenhower Medical Center, opened in 1971, is a 540-bed hospital with in-patient facilities, emergency department, and out-patient clinics and urgent care centers. Eisenhower employs approximately 2800 people.

== Recreation and annual activities ==
=== Professional teams ===
The following teams compete in a professional league.

Club	Sport	League	Venue (capacity)	First season	Moved to Valley	Titles in Valley
Coachella Valley Firebirds	Hockey	American Hockey League	Acrisure Arena (11,000)	2022	—	—
Coachella Valley Lakers	Basketball	NBA G League	Acrisure Arena (11,000)	2026–27	2026	—

The following teams formally competed in the Coachella Valley.

Palm Springs Angels	Baseball	California League	Angels Stadium	1986-1993
Palm Springs Suns	Baseball	Western Baseball League	Suns Stadium	1995-1996
Coachella FC	Soccer	United Premier Soccer League	Bagdouma Park	2024-2025

With warm winters and more than 350 days of sunshine per year, recreational hiking and horseback riding are popular in the many canyons in the mountains that surround the valley. Thousand Palms Canyon is a popular destination, amongst many.

The Coachella Valley was once a safe haven for hay fever allergy sufferers before the surge of golf courses and year-round lawns, and people with bronchitis, emphysema and asthma chose to relocate for health reasons in the early half of the 20th century.

In the early 20th century, the town of Palm Springs was ideal for an agricultural economy. Today, many of the fields and groves of the desert cities were replaced by homes and golf courses. Agriculture thrived in the eastern or lower part of the Coachella Valley in Indio, Coachella, Thermal, Mecca, and Oasis thanks in part to a large underground aquifer to sustain a year-round green environment.

Roughly 125 golf courses blanket the area, making it one of the world's premier golf destinations and the most popular golf vacation destination in California. The Merrill Lynch Skins Game was held in La Quinta each Thanksgiving and drew some of the biggest names in golf. The PGA has a major presence in La Quinta as well with the PGA WEST golf and residential complex. One of the host courses of the aforementioned Bob Hope Chrysler Classic, a PGA WEST fairway represents the area in Soarin' Over California, an IMAX-based attraction at Disney California Adventure Park theme park.

The area is also dotted with casinos owned by the local Indian tribes. As of 2024, there are six standalone casinos in the Coachella Valley. The valley is home to resort hotels built around spas with natural mineral water wells, specifically in Desert Hot Springs. The Palm Springs Aerial Tramway takes visitors from the valley floor to the San Jacinto Peak mountain station 8,516 feet (2,596 m) above sea level.

Palm Springs is home to one of the country's largest collections of mid-century architecture. Thousands of homes, apartments, hotels, businesses and other buildings were designed in this fashion across the city. International mid-century enthusiasts come to Palm Springs to admire the design.

=== Events, activities and attractions ===
Changing exhibits of sculptures can be found along El Paseo Drive in Palm Desert.

Palm Springs has the annual Palm Springs International Film Festival every January and the Palm Springs International Short Film Festival (or ShortFest) held in June, at the Palm Springs Cultural Center.

The Indian Wells Tennis Garden, opened in 2000, hosts the BNP Paribas Open tennis tournament annually in March.

Each February, Indio hosts the Riverside County Fair and National Date Festival. Indio is also the site of the annual Coachella Valley Music and Arts Festival, a multi-genre music concert venue in the Empire Polo Ground, recognized as one of the nation's premiere music festivals for its high-profile acts and scenic beauty.

Visitors see desert nature at the nearby Joshua Tree National Park and the Sand to Snow National Monument to the north, the Santa Rosa Mountains to the south and Mt. San Jacinto Aerial Tram to the west. The Living Desert Zoo and Gardens is located in Palm Desert and has a collection of animals mostly from North America and Africa and hosts the annual Wild Lights Christmas light display.

The Coachella Valley History Museum in Indio is devoted to the preservation and interpretation of the Coachella Valley's historical artifacts.

Other activities include:

- An annual air show is held in November is held at the Jacqueline Cochran Regional Airport in Thermal. The Palm Springs Airport Annual Air Show held every January displays World War II-era vintage fighter aircraft.
- The Desert Circuit Horse Show is one of the nation's largest horse competitions is also held at the Desert International Horse Park located in Thermal from January through March.
- The Palm Springs Power collegiate summer league baseball team plays during the summer and the Palm Springs Chill is a team of the California Winter League plays in January and February both in Palm Springs Stadium with opponent teams the Canada A's, Coachella Valley Snowbirds and Palm Desert Coyotes. It is the former site of the California Angels major league spring training facility from 1961 to 1993.
- The College of the Desert in Palm Desert is the home of the Roadrunners, which participate in junior college football, baseball, basketball, softball, soccer, and other sports.
- The expanded Palm Springs Convention Center is a major venue for shows, concerts, auctions, expos and exhibits. In the past, it played host to exhibition basketball, roller hockey games, ice skating events and indoor sports. The NBA G League basketball Agua Caliente Clippers of Ontario played some games there.
- In 2008–11, The Indian Wells Tennis Garden hosted the Annual NBA Outdoors Game hosted by the Phoenix Suns every first weekend of October.
- The Walter Annenberg Estate Museum dedicated to the famous valley resident, billionaire, friend to celebrities and philanthropist.
- Art of Food & Wine Palm Desert in the Gardens in El Paseo.
- Modernism Week
- Indian Wells Arts and Food Festival
- La Quinta Arts Festival
- Southwest Arts Festival
- Children's Discovery Museum

== Education ==
The Coachella Valley is served by three public school districts: the Coachella Valley Unified School District serving Coachella, Thermal, Mecca, and North Shore ; Desert Sands Unified School District serving La Quinta, Indio and Palm Desert; and Palm Springs Unified School District serving Palm Springs, Cathedral City, Rancho Mirage, and Desert Hot Springs.

There are 11 public high schools:

- Cathedral City High School, Cathedral City.
- Coachella Valley High School, Coachella.
- Desert Hot Springs High School, Desert Hot Springs.
- Desert Mirage High School, Thermal.
- Indio High School, Indio – renovated.
- La Quinta High School (La Quinta, California).
- Palm Desert High School, Palm Desert.
- Palm Springs High School, Palm Springs.
- Rancho Mirage High School, Rancho Mirage.
- Shadow Hills High School, Indio.
- West Shores High School, Salton City.

For athletics, the schools compete in the Desert Valley League, Desert Empire League or the De Anza league, all part of the Southern Section of the California Interscholastic Federation.

Private education is provided by such as:

- Catholic School (Our Lady of Perpetual Help), Indio.
- Christian Desert Calvary Bible School, Cathedral City.
- Christian Scientist School, Palm Desert.
- Community of Christ School, Palm Springs.
- Desert Adventist Academy, Palm Desert.
- Desert Chapel and high school, Palm Springs.
- Desert Christian Academy (formerly Christian School of the Desert), Bermuda Dunes.
- Desert Torah Academy (was Jewish Community School), Palm Desert.
- Escuela Cesar Chavez (High School), Indio.
- Grace Christian Academy, Indio (and Yucca Valley)
- Indio (County) Community School, Indio
- King's Schools (Distinctively Christian Education), Palm Springs.
- Learning Tree School, Palm Desert.
- Marywood Academy, Rancho Mirage.
- Mayfield School, Rancho Mirage.
- Mission Springs School, Desert Hot Springs.
- Morongo (Desert View) Military Academy, Desert Hot Springs.
- Nova Academy, Coachella.
- Oasis Seventh-Day Adventist Academy, Palm Desert.
- Orange Crest Academy, Palm Springs (Riverside based).
- Palm Desert Presbyterian Church School, Palm Desert.
- Palm Springs Community School (Harry Oliver-Thousand Palms and Frances Stevens campuses-Palm Springs).
- Palm Springs County School, North Palm Springs.
- Palm Valley School, Rancho Mirage.
- Presbyterian Church School of the Desert, Palm Springs.
- River Springs Charter School, Indio
- Sacred Heart Catholic School, Palm Desert.
- Saint Teresa's Catholic School, Palm Springs.
- San Cayetano Community School, Palm Desert.
- Southwest Community Church School, Indian Wells.
- The Ranch Christian Academy, Thousand Palms.
- Xavier College Preparatory High School, Palm Desert.

Higher education is served by the College of the Desert (COD), a community college with its main campus in Palm Desert. COD constructed several satellite campuses including an annex on Oasis Street in Indio, an East Valley campus in Thermal and a West Valley annex in Palm Springs. COD has experienced sudden growth in the campus from the 1970s to the late 2000s.

The University of California Riverside (Coachella Valley) and California State University San Bernardino (Palm Desert) campus annexes are located in the Indian Wells (Higher) Education Center in Palm Desert.

There is the Santa Barbara Business College and the San Bernardino Skidron Business School/College in Palm Desert. Another college is Brandman University, operated by Chapman University in Palm Desert.

== Media ==
The Coachella Valley, under the title "Palm Springs", is a distinct Nielsen and Arbitron ratings market, with eight local television stations and twenty radio stations. The first television station in the Coachella Valley is KMIR channel 6 by John Conte and Bob Hope, the NBC affiliate premiered in 1968 remains on the air as the desert's longest running TV station. KPLM (which later became KESQ, the Coachella Valley's current ABC affiliate) went on the air later with a party that made national headlines; it was founded by Robert E. Leonard. The station later made national news and garnered late night jokes from Johnny Carson and Bob Newhart when the station manager accidentally ran on air a pornographic movie. Gun TV, the gun shopping channel, was headquartered in the Valley.

Cable subscribers under Charter Spectrum cable can receive some Los Angeles area television channels as part of basic cable service. Satellite television and satellite radio are available as well. The eastern Coachella Valley can receive Mexican television from Mexicali, 90 miles (140 km) away.

The Gannett Company-owned The Desert Sun is the local daily newspaper; the Los Angeles Times and the Riverside Press-Enterprise is also sold there (Gannett also operates the Desert Post Weekly). The Desert Valley Star Weekly is an independent community weekly that covers the Coachella Valley, and the Desert Entertainer is a calendar-type entertainment weekly produced by Hi-Desert Publishing. The area's city magazine, Palm Springs Life caters to the valley's rich and famous elites, while The Sun Runner Magazine covers the California desert region, including the Coachella Valley. Palm Springs Art Patron Magazine covers the Art community of the Desert. A number of periodicals cover the area's LGBT community, including In Magazine.

An alternative news and entertainment publication, the Coachella Valley Independent, was founded online in late 2012. It is currently in print as a monthly publication. Another independent publication is Coachella Valley Weekly, which is printed weekly and was also founded in 2012. The Coachella Valley also has a Coachella Valley Art Scene Blog for the younger community.

=== Television ===
Included are Low-Power stations and relay transmitters with limited frequency area

- KPLM-LP Channel 1 Ind. - Twentynine Palms.
- KYUM-LD Channels 15/51 (Spanish language religious) – Indio/Imperial Valley/Yuma, Arizona.
- KAKZ-LD Channel 4 (Azteca America) – Palm Springs.
- KVYE Channel 7 (Univision) – Yuma, Arizona.
- KVPS Channel 8 – (Spanish language Religious) – Indio.
- Channel 9 (KECY FOX) – El Centro, California.
- K09XW Channel 9 (PBS) – transmitter of KVCR-DT Riverside/San Bernardino – Palm Springs/Palm Desert.
- Channel 10 K10QV-D (K10OU)/ KLPS Channel 19 (Independent) – Palm Springs.
- Channel 11/34 (KESE 35 Telemundo) – El Centro.
- KYAV-LP Channel 12 AccuWeather – Yucca Valley.
- Channel 13 (KYMA-DT CBS) – Yuma Az/El Centro.
- Channel 14 (XHBM – Televisa) – Mexicali.
- K14AB (KTTV 11 Fox Los Angeles) – Yucca Valley.
- KUNA-LD Channel 15 (Telemundo) – Palm Desert/La Quinta.
- K15FC – transmitter of KESQ Palm Springs – Joshua Tree.
- K16AA – transmitter of KCBS Los Angeles – Morongo Valley.
- KODG-LP Channel 17 KOCE 50-PBS Orange County – Indio/Palm Springs.
- KJHP-LP Channel 18 (PBS) – transmitter of KVCR-DT – Morongo Valley/Palm Springs.
- K19DB (Spanish language religious) – Victorville.
- KCWQ-LD channel 20 (The CW) – Palm Springs/Palm Desert/Indio.
- K20HZ "KMXX" Channel 20 (HSN/ MexiCanal) – Indio/Palm Springs.
- K21DO "KNDO" (3ABN religious) – Indio/Palm Springs.
- KSHT-LP Channel 22 (Independent) – Indio/Palm Springs.
- KVMD Channels 23/31 (Independent, Asian language, ethnic and EWTN programming) – Twentynine Palms/ Victorville.
- FNX Channel 24.2 – San Bernardino.
- XHAQ channel 28 (TV Azteca) – Mexicali.
- K29GK – transmitter of KTLA Los Angeles – Yucca Valley.
- K60GY 30 – transmitter of KPSE-LD 50 – Twentynine Palms.
- KRVD Channel 30 (PBS) – Banning.
- KRET-CD Channels 31/45 (MeTV) – Palm Desert/ Yucca Valley.
- KDFX-CD Channel 33 (FOX, cable 11) – Indio/Palm Springs.
- "K35LA" – Channel 35 KCET Desert cities – Digital cable channel 218 – Los Angeles.
- Channels 35/39 (Telemundo) via KVEA Corona/Los Angeles.
- XHBC channels 3/34/35 (Televisa) – Mexicali.
- KMIR Channel 36 (NBC, cable 13) – Palm Desert (Palm Springs), 36.2 (MeTV) and 36.3 – Movies! – also available in Banning, California.
- KVES-LD Channel 36 (Univision) – Palm Springs.
- KPSP-CD Channels 38 (CBS, cable 2) (CBS-Loop of local KESQ family news programs) – Thousand Palms.
- Channel 39 (RFDTV translator) – Coachella/Imperial.
- KVER-CD Channels 41 (Univision), 41.2 (Unimas), 41.3 (Court TV Mystery), 41.4 (Laff), 41.5 (KPST-FM) – Indio.
- KVES-CA Channels 41.1 (GalaVision), 41.2 (UniMas) – Cathedral City.
- KESQ-TV Channel 42 (ABC, cable 3) – Palm Desert (Palm Springs)/Indio – available in Hemet/San Jacinto and Banning/Beaumont.
- KPXN-TV Channel 43 (Ion) – San Bernardino transmits.
- "KHIX" Channel 45 – transmitter of KVME (MeTV) Bishop.
- KFTR-DT Channel 46 (UniMas) – Ontario/San Bernardino.
- XHILA-TDT Channel 46 – Mexicali.
- BYU-TV transmitter of KBYU-TV 11 Provo, Utah.
- K49HV Channel 49 – transmitter of KILM (SonLife Broadcasting religious) Victorville.
- KPSE-LD Channel 50 (My Network) – Palm Springs.
- KAZA-TV channels 54/34 (Azteca America) – Los Angeles.
- KDOC channel 56 (Independent) – Anaheim/Orange County.

=== Radio ===
The Morris Corporation-owned Desert Radio Group of Palm Springs owns three AM and three FM radio stations; RM Broadcasting of Palm Springs is the largest in terms of FM ownership with four stations: KPLM "K-Palm", KRHQ "KJ-Jazz", KJJZ "the Oasis" and KMRJ "The Heat"; and R&R Broadcasting of Palm Springs, the only other independent group other than RR Broadcasting, owns three AM and two FM stations with negotiations solidified to close the purchase of their newest station, KWXY-FM. The group currently owns the FM station merged with the other station KDES 104.7 moved to 98.5 on the FM dial in 2011, CBS Radio KXO is the region's oldest radio station since 1927 based in El Centro, California. Formerly "KEZN", KQPS is one of 3 LGBT-themed local radio stations on 103.1 FM Palm Desert, Ca. 92260, and KCPC (AM) Public Radio based in Cathedral City.

Alpha Media Palm Springs is the largest radio group in the Coachella Valley with 8 local radio stations.

- The Eagle 106.9 FM (KDGL) Classic Hits
- MIX 100.5 FM (KPSI) The Desert's Best Mix - #2 station in the Coachella Valley, total audience
- U92.7 FM (KKUU) Rhythmic Contemporary Hits Radio- #1 station in the Coachella Valley, total audience
- K-NEWS News Talk (KNWZ) The Voice of the Valley! 94.3 FM & 104.7 FM, 970 AM East Valley, 1140 AM West Valley, 1250 AM & 103.7FM Desert Cities
- KCLB Rock 93.7 FM, The heritage Rock Station
- The Bull 98.5 FM Country (KDES), The Valley's New Country Music station
- MOD 107.3 FM (KDES-HD2) Old Standards
- ESPN SPORTS Talk 103.9 FM (KKUU-HD2)

WestMark Media LLC owns KPSF, 1200 AM and 100.9 FM. The only oldies station called Studio 100.9.

- Studio 100.9
- Studio 100.9 Home Page

== Infrastructure ==
The Coachella Valley is served by the following utilities:

Electricity

- Southern California Edison (serves Palm Desert, Palm Springs, Rancho Mirage, Desert Hot Springs, and Cathedral City)
- Imperial Irrigation District (serves La Quinta, Indio, Thousand Palms, Indian Wells, and Coachella)

Natural gas

- Southern California Gas Company

Cable Television

- Spectrum Cable

=== Transportation ===
Aviation in the area is served by the Palm Springs International Airport in Palm Springs, Jacqueline Cochran Regional Airport in Thermal and Bermuda Dunes Municipal Airport in Bermuda Dunes. Interstate 10 runs along the northeastern rim of the valley while State Route 111 runs for about 30 miles along the southwestern rim of the valley and serves as the main arterial highway between almost all Coachella Valley cities. A four-lane expressway now known as State Highway 86 opened in the early 1990s as a "special" bypass (hence, it was known as State Highway 86S until the "S" suffix was dropped) of the former two-lane portion of Highway 86. Historic signs designating the original route of U.S. Route 99 through the area may be found along present-day Indio Boulevard through Indio and Harrison Street through Coachella.

Public transportation in the valley is provided by the SunLine Transit Agency based in Thousand Palms, which was among the country's first transit agencies to totally convert to alternate fuel vehicles, including full-sized buses powered by fuel cells.

The Palm Springs Airport provides service to many North American destinations. Amtrak trains serve North Palm Springs and its coaches provide a connection to Metrolink Los Angeles regional commuter rail at Moreno Valley station. Greyhound buses link the Valley with the Los Angeles metropolitan area, Calexico on the Mexican border, and points east.

== Notable people ==
The area has been a magnet for Hollywood stars since the 1930s when Charles Farrell and Ralph Bellamy founded the Racquet Club of Palm Springs. Bing Crosby would later found the Blue Skies Trailer Park in Rancho Mirage, unique for its expensive trailer homes each with its own individual theme. In the mid-century celebrities known to stop by Palm Springs included Humphrey Bogart, John Barrymore, Douglas Fairbanks Jr., Mary Pickford, Judy Garland, Fred Astaire, Ginger Rogers, and Jack Benny, who did numerous broadcasts of his radio show from Palm Springs.

Farrell, after whom a street in Palm Springs is named, would later be elected mayor. Farrell Drive is built on the path of the Palmdale Railroad, a narrow-gauge horse-drawn railroad right-of-way originally built to serve the proposed town of Palmdale. The town was never built and the railroad was abandoned after a few years of operation. The ties were used to build one of the area's earliest residences and the Cornelia White House still stands today in downtown Palm Springs.

Medal of Honor recipient Captain William McGonagle was a graduate of Coachella High School and made the valley his home after his retirement. Mitchell Paige was another Medal of Honor veteran who lived in Palm Desert and has a middle school in La Quinta named after him. Jacqueline Cochran, founder and director of the Women Airforce Service Pilots lived her last years in Indio. In 2005, Microsoft CEO Bill Gates reportedly bought and owns a home in The Vintage Club Country Club in Indian Wells.

Elvis Presley honeymooned in Palm Springs in 1967 and was a frequent visitor as well since he owned a home here from 1970 until his death in 1977. Frank Sinatra, Bob Hope and Dinah Shore were residents of the valley and were instrumental in the creation of three major golf tournaments, the Frank Sinatra Celebrity Golf Tournament, Bob Hope Chrysler Classic (now hosted by comedian and golf aficionado George Lopez) and the LPGA Tour's Nabisco Championship. All three have streets named in their honor as does President Gerald Ford, a longtime Rancho Mirage resident and benefactor of the substance abuse center that bears his wife's name, the Betty Ford Center on the campus of the Eisenhower Medical Center, named for general, U.S. president and part-time resident Dwight Eisenhower. The medical center expanded in size by the new Walter Annenberg building named for the valley resident, billionaire, friend of celebrities and philanthropist. Sinatra and his friends, including Dean Martin, Perry Como, Tony Bennett, Sammy Davis Jr., Rosemary Clooney and Connie Francis were frequent visitors in the close-knit celebrity community of the Coachella Valley in the 1950s and 1960s.

The main road into Palm Springs International Airport, named simply "Airport Road", was renamed Kirk Douglas Way on October 17, 2004. Douglas, a major area benefactor, lived in the valley for more than fifty years and is credited with spearheading the drive to modernize the area over those five decades. His son, actor Michael Douglas, is said to own a residence in Palm Springs with his wife, actress Catherine Zeta-Jones.

Lucille Ball and Desi Arnaz were instrumental in forming the exclusive Thunderbird Heights tract in Rancho Mirage, once the home of President Gerald Ford and his wife Betty. According to Palm Springs Life magazine, that same tract inspired the name in late 1954 for the Ford Thunderbird. The magazine incorrectly cites that a favorite vacation spot for General Motors executives, Palm Desert's Eldorado Country Club, inspired the name for Cadillac's top model the year before — though Cadillac had chosen the name five years before the club's founding in an internal competition. Local automotive history indicates that designer Raymond Loewy penned the Studebaker Avanti in his Palm Springs home. Especially since the 1950s, Palm Springs and nearby golf clubs are hailed as the "playground of celebrities". However it is said that celebrities travel or reside in the Palm Springs area in lesser numbers as compared to yesteryear, but the area's "star power" made a comeback in the 2000s.

Ball and Arnaz helped finance construction of the Indian Wells Country Club. Founded in 1956 with their winter residence on DesiLu Court, Indian Wells became a major factor in "down valley" growth in the 1970s and 1980s. A mostly gated community, Indian Wells has one of the highest per capita income of any small town in the United States, while nearby Coachella, a short distance southeast on State Route 111 is the third poorest city of the 10,000–50,000 population range in the nation, though that is rapidly changing as the area develops. A memorial to Eisenhower can be found on the front lawn of Indian Wells City Hall, also features the local veterans memorial plaque to represent the community's 800 veterans, a high number of war veterans per ratio of its predominantly senior citizen population. Coachella has the Vietnam War veterans' memorial to represent their community's high representation of armed forces volunteers, a large percentage had Spanish surnames since the city's population are over 90 percent Latino.

Many other celebrities, past and present, have called the area home such as actor Paul Burke. Among those who grew up in the area:

- Vanessa Marcil is a La Quinta native and attended Indio High School.
- Suzanne Somers spent a part of her childhood in Cathedral City and attended Palm Springs High School.
- Billy Steinberg grew up in Palm Springs and worked at the Dave Freedman Grape Farm in Thermal.
- Alison Lohman is a native of Palm Springs and grew up in Palm Desert.
- Tyler Hilton is also a native of Palm Springs and graduated from La Quinta High School. Hilton performed a concert in the school theatre in 2006.
- Cameron Crowe grew up in a rural home near Indio.
- Rich Newey grew up in Bermuda Dunes.
- Alan O'Day grew up in Coachella.
- Aubrey O'Day was a 2001 graduate of La Quinta High School.
- Josh Homme attended Palm Desert High School.
- Tony Reagins, General Manager of the Los Angeles Angels of Anaheim, is an Indio native and attended Indio High school.
- Edward White, football player of the San Diego Chargers and Minnesota Vikings is an Indio native and attended Indio High school.
- Jenna Ortega is a native of Indio.

U.S. President John F. Kennedy was a frequent guest of Frank Sinatra, and a plaque in one of the pews of Sacred Heart Catholic Church in Palm Desert marks the spot where Kennedy would usually sit during Mass.

That same area in Palm Desert once served as a training ground for General George Patton's Third Army troops and tank battalions; today, the site is home to the El Paseo shopping district. Patton also trained in a huge plot of desert stretching from Chiriaco Summit just off the eastern end of the valley northward almost to Amboy along U.S. Route 66 in the Mojave Desert. Tank tracks from those maneuvers are still visible today in the open desert and a museum dedicated to Patton is located in Chiriaco Summit. Patton was also a frequent guest at the Whittier Ranch House in Indio, a grand adobe structure which had faced the possibility of demolition as the ranch lands surrounding it were being developed. A grass roots organization had petitioned the city to preserve the structure for use as a VFW post; it has instead been restored and retained as the clubhouse for the new Whittier Ranch housing development. It is also now a California state historic site.

Sonny Bono ran a restaurant in downtown Palm Springs. Frustrated by the lack of cooperation he faced from the city council over a new sign for the restaurant, the entertainer took matters into his own hands and ran for mayor. He retained local conservative talk radio host Marshall Gilbert (heard regularly on KNWQ) as his campaign manager in a successful bid that not only put Bono back in the public eye, but fueled his later campaign for a seat on the United States Congress, a position he held until his death in a skiing accident in 1998. His widow, Mary (now Mary Bono Mack), filled the vacancy left by her husband and later campaigned successfully on her own. She was defeated by Democrat Raul Ruiz in the 2012 election, and moved to Florida. Both Sonny Bono and Frank Sinatra are buried at Desert Memorial Park in Cathedral City.

The La Quinta Resort and Club, a series of bungalows built in 1926 in what was then known as Marshall's Cove is the oldest resort in the valley. Frank Capra wrote the script for 1937 Lost Horizon poolside there, in the La Quinta Cove where the resort is located. Capra died in La Quinta and is buried in the nearby Coachella Valley Public Cemetery.

So fond was Walt Disney of his property at the Smoke Tree Ranch in Palm Springs that he often wore a tie tac which was in the shape of the Smoke Tree Ranch logo. Disney reluctantly sold the property to help finance the construction of Disneyland. Partners, bronze sculptures of Disney standing next to Mickey Mouse in each of the Disney theme parks clearly show the brand on Disney's tie tac.

Clint Eastwood formerly owned a restaurant called the Hog's Breath Inn in Old Town La Quinta. The restaurant is currently owned by the Kaiser Restaurant Group, but maintains the Clint Eastwood inspired motif.

TV producer and media mogul Merv Griffin owned a home and ranch which is now part of the PGA West community. It was known as the "Griffin Ranch", but the land was sold and became an equestrian ranch housing tract and was annexed by the city of La Quinta.

== In popular culture ==
Noteworthy and memorable references in popular culture include the animated Looney Tunes short Bully for Bugs in which Bugs Bunny requests directions to the Coachella Valley "and the big carrot festival therein." An annual carrot festival is in fact held just outside the area in the Imperial County town of Holtville, approximately 70 miles to the southeast.

The generation-defining novel Generation X: Tales for an Accelerated Culture, by Canadian novelist Douglas Coupland, describes the angst of those born between roughly 1960 and 1965 (Generation X-ers refers to those born from 1960 to 1982) and is set in the Palm Springs of the late 1980s.

A second classic 1980s novel, Less than Zero, a tale of disaffected, rich teenagers of Los Angeles, has its climactic scenes of excess and despair set in Palm Springs. The film Less than Zero was made in 1987, directed by Marek Kanievska and starring Andrew McCarthy, Robert Downey Jr. and Jami Gertz.

Parts of 'Highway Dragnet, 1954, were filmed in the Valley.

Another famous movie filmed in the Coachella Valley (as well as Yucca Valley and Twentynine Palms, to the north) is It's a Mad, Mad, Mad, Mad World. It even includes the former Desert Air airport, now the site of the Rancho Las Palmas Resort and Spa in Rancho Mirage. The airfield escape scene in A Night in Casablanca was filmed at present-day Palm Springs International Airport; Mount San Jacinto is clearly seen in the background.

Most of Robert Altman's 1977 avant-garde drama 3 Women was shot in the geographical region surrounding Coachella Valley.

Tex Avery made a brief reference to Palm Springs via a sight gag in his 1948 animated short for MGM, The Cat That Hated People. In the showroom of the "Moonbeam Rocket Company", a tiny rocket ship with a sign showing its intended destination of Palm Springs is shown among a series of large rockets also displaying signs indicating not terrestrial but rather their galactic destinations.

The early 1960s would see the movie Palm Springs Weekend filmed on location. A humorous situation involving four drunk LAPD policemen in a rented aircraft attempting to reclaim a Palm Springs golf course in the name of the local Indian tribes can be found in the 1975 novel, The Choirboys.

An episode of The Rocky and Bullwinkle Show titled "The Ruby Yacht of Omar Khayyam" announces the upcoming second installment of the episode as "Rimsky & Korsakov Go to Palm Springs, or Song of Indio".

In the 1984 music video by Tears for Fears' Everybody Wants to Rule the World was shot on location in the Coachella Valley. The rock video features scenes of a few local landmarks: the dinosaur structures near Cabazon, the windmill farms, scenery along Interstate 10 and state route 111, a scene of two dancers appear in a gas station on state route 86, and the shores of the Salton Sea.

In 1988, "The Race" by Swiss dance band Yello featured a fictitious sportscaster talking about the "thirty-first annual formula race" in Palm Springs. While Palm Springs did briefly host an annual Grand Prix, it ran for considerably fewer than thirty-one years.

In the 1990s two television series shows P.S. I Luv U and Phenom, the characters and plots were set in Palm Springs.

In 2006, The CW television network had a teen drama series Hidden Palms is set in a gated desert community near Palm Springs, although there is a real Hidden Palms in Palm Desert. By irony, the real gated community is adjacent to Palm Desert High school.

In local Tyler Hilton's song "When It Comes", he references Palm Desert's strip of high-class fashion and dining singing, "When I'm cruising El Paseo / In my off-white coup back '65."

A majority of the 2007 film Alpha Dog was shot in Palm Springs.

The helicopter scene in Mission: Impossible III was filmed in the windfarm outside of Palm Springs.

The city was mentioned on an episode of Comedy Central's Reno 911! by sergeant/lieutenant Jim (Doug) Dangle, an openly gay character of the show. He would hang out in Palm Springs, as well in San Francisco and West Hollywood, but he eventually chose Reno as his hometown.

In an episode of the animated comedy Family Guy On the Road to Rhode Island, baby Stewie and his friend, Brian (a talking dog) figured a way to return home from vacation in Lois' parents home in Palm Springs.

On American Dad! Season 2, Episode 4 – Lincoln Lover, Stan Smith said to a speech in the Republican National Convention when representatives of the Gay Log Cabin Republicans were present: "Invite half of Palm Springs...oh, invite everyone in Palm Springs..." based on a belief based on a survey by a demographic think tank on about Half of the city's population are Gay or GLBT people.
