= Palm Springs (disambiguation) =

Palm Springs is a desert city in California.

Palm Springs may also refer to:

== Places ==
- Palm Springs, California
  - Palm Springs High School
  - Palm Springs International Airport
  - Palm Springs station, a train station
- Palm Springs, Florida
- Coachella Valley, California, also known as the Palm Springs area

== Entertainment ==
- Palm Springs (1936 film), a film directed by Aubrey Scotto
- Palm Springs (2020 film), an American romantic comedy film

== See also ==
- North Palm Springs, California
- Palm Springs North, Florida
