= Palm Springs North, Florida =

- Census-designated place
- Location in Miami-Dade County and the state of Florida

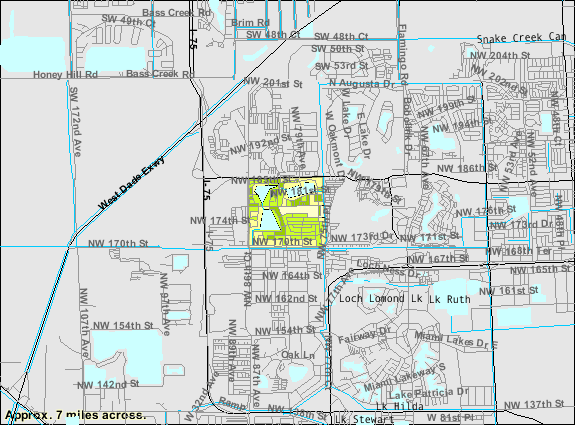
- U.S. Census Bureau map showing CDP boundaries
- Coordinates: 25°56′06″N 80°20′02″W
- Country: United States
- State: Florida
- County: Miami-Dade

Area
  - Total: 1.00 sq mi (2.59 km^{2})
  - Land: 0.80 sq mi (2.06 km^{2})
  - Water: 0.20 sq mi (0.53 km^{2})
- Elevation: 7 ft (2.1 m)

Population (2020)
  - Total: 5,030
  - Density: 6,323.6/sq mi (2,441.55/km^{2})
- Time zone: UTC-5 (Eastern (EST))
  - Summer (DST): UTC-4 (EDT)
- ZIP code: 33015 (Hialeah)
- Area codes: 305, 786, 645
- FIPS code: 12-54500
- GNIS feature ID: 305079

Palm Springs North (called PSN by area residents as of 1984) is an unincorporated community and census-designated place (CDP) in Miami-Dade County, Florida, United States. It is part of the Miami metropolitan area of South Florida. The population was 5,030 at the 2020 census.

== Geography ==
Palm Springs North is located 18 miles (29 km) northwest of downtown Miami at 25°55′58″N 80°19′58″W (25.932904, -80.332871). It is bordered to the south by the town of Miami Lakes and to the northeast by the unincorporated community of Country Club.

According to the United States Census Bureau, the CDP has a total area of 1.0 square mile (2.6 km^{2}), of which 0.8 square miles (2.1 km^{2}) are land and 0.2 square miles (0.5 km^{2}), or 20.50%, are water.

== Governance ==
In 1984, there was a civic association. Morris Panner of the Miami Herald described it as "The closest thing to a local government".

== Demographics ==
Historical population
Census	Pop.	Note	%±
1980	5,838		—
1990	5,300		−9.2%
2000	5,460		3.0%
2010	5,253		−3.8%
2020	5,030		−4.2%

=== Racial and ethnic composition ===
Palm Springs North CDP, Florida – Racial and ethnic composition Note: the US Census treats Hispanic/Latino as an ethnic category. This table excludes Latinos from the racial categories and assigns them to a separate category. Hispanics/Latinos may be of any race.
Race / Ethnicity (NH = Non-Hispanic)	Pop 2010	Pop 2020	% 2010	% 2020
White (NH)	1,103	689	21.00%	13.70%
Black or African American (NH)	29	48	0.55%	0.95%
Native American or Alaska Native (NH)	4	1	0.08%	0.02%
Asian (NH)	22	8	0.42%	0.16%
Pacific Islander or Native Hawaiian (NH)	0	0	0.00%	0.00%
Some other race (NH)	0	9	0.00%	0.18%
Mixed race or Multiracial (NH)	16	29	0.30%	0.58%
Hispanic or Latino (any race)	4,079	4,246	77.65%	84.41%
Total	5,253	5,030	100.00%	100.00%

=== 2020 census ===
As of the 2020 census, Palm Springs North had a population of 5,030. The median age was 42.7 years. 20.5% of residents were under the age of 18 and 17.8% of residents were 65 years of age or older. For every 100 females there were 92.5 males, and for every 100 females age 18 and over there were 89.5 males age 18 and over.

100.0% of residents lived in urban areas, while 0.0% lived in rural areas.

There were 1,585 households in Palm Springs North, of which 38.2% had children under the age of 18 living in them. Of all households, 59.7% were married-couple households, 10.6% were households with a male householder and no spouse or partner present, and 21.5% were households with a female householder and no spouse or partner present. About 12.3% of all households were made up of individuals and 7.2% had someone living alone who was 65 years of age or older.

There were 1,622 housing units, of which 2.3% were vacant. The homeowner vacancy rate was 0.5% and the rental vacancy rate was 4.0%.

The 2020 American Community Survey estimated that 1,284 families resided in the CDP.

=== 2010 census ===
As of the 2010 United States census, there were 5,253 people, 1,567 households, and 1,443 families residing in the CDP.

=== 2000 census ===
As of the census of 2000, there were 5,460 people, 1,630 households, and 1,449 families residing in the CDP. The population density was 7,885.2 inhabitants per square mile (3,044.5/km^{2}). There were 1,656 housing units at an average density of 2,391.6 per square mile (923.4/km^{2}). The racial makeup of the CDP was 93.0% White (33.2% were Non-Hispanic White), 0.8% African American, 0.2% Native American, 0.6% Asian, 3.2% from other races, and 2.3% from two or more races.

As of 2000, there were 1,630 households, out of which 43.3% had children under the age of 18 living with them, 72.5% were married couples living together, 11.2% had a female householder with no husband present, and 11.1% were non-families. 8.3% of all households were made up of individuals, and 3.1% had someone living alone who was 65 years of age or older. The average household size was 3.33 and the average family size was 3.49.

In 2000, in the CDP, the population was spread out, with 27.4% under the age of 18, 6.4% from 18 to 24, 31.8% from 25 to 44, 23.4% from 45 to 64, and 11.0% who were 65 years of age or older. The median age was 36 years. For every 100 females, there were 96.1 males. For every 100 females age 18 and over, there were 93.4 males.

In 2000, the median income for a household in the CDP was $62,161, and the median income for a family was $64,428. Males had a median income of $39,886 versus $28,281 for females. The per capita income for the CDP was $20,383. About 3.6% of families and 4.4% of the population were below the poverty line, including 2.1% of those under age 18 and 15.9% of those age 65 or over.

As of 2000, speakers of Spanish as a first language accounted for 6.18% of residents, while English made up 93.82% of the population.

== Education ==
Miami-Dade County Public Schools is the school district of the area. Palm Springs North Elementary School is located in Palm Springs North.

Public schools that serve Palm Springs North are:

- Palm Springs North Elementary School
- Spanish Lake Elementary School
- Lawton Chiles Middle School
- American Senior High School
- Barbara Goleman Senior High School

Private schools that serve Palm Springs North are:

- Mother of Our Redeemer Catholic School
- Dade Christian School

== Parks and recreation ==
- Norman and Jean Reach Park
