= B Bar H Ranch, California =

B Bar H Ranch
- Unincorporated community
- Position in California
- Coordinates: 33°54′37″N 116°28′55″W
- Country: United States
- State: California
- County: Riverside

Area
  - Total: 0.375 sq mi (0.971 km^{2})
  - Land: 0.375 sq mi (0.971 km^{2})
  - Water: 0 sq mi (0 km^{2}) 0%
- Elevation: 784 ft (239 m)
- Time zone: UTC-8 (Pacific (PST))
  - Summer (DST): UTC-7 (PDT)
- GNIS feature ID: GNIS 238863

B Bar H Ranch, California is an unincorporated area with cultural and historical features and is a residential community in Riverside County, California. B Bar H Ranch is located between Palm Springs and Desert Hot Springs in the Seven Palms Valley. California Home Town Locator states the B Bar H Ranch Latitude is 33.9102927 and Longitude is -116.4819566. The GNIS entry date is January 19, 1981. B Bar H Ranch sits at an elevation of 784 feet (239 m). B Bar H Ranch is approximately eight miles north of Palm Springs, California and approximately six miles south of Desert Hot Springs, California. B Bar H Ranch's approximate 240 acres are bordered by 18th Avenue to the north, Mountain View Road to the east, 20th Avenue to the south, and Bubbling Wells Road to the west. B Bar H Ranch consisted of approximately 899 residents as of the 2010 US Census.

== Historic beginning ==
Original B Bar H Ranch guest area - heated pool and sun bathing facilities

During World War II, the B-bar-H Ranch was one of the Southern California Desert Cities area's most exclusive winter resorts. It was a place where prominent politicians, businessmen and bankers would socialize with Hollywood stars, writers and musicians. The Ranch was named after Hollywood mogul Lucienne Hubbard and his son-in-law Charles Bender. The two men purchased the land in 1927 from the Southern Pacific Land Company. Lucienne Hubbard was a writer and helped promote the B Bar H Ranch and surrounding areas' natural mineral hot springs. The Ranch soon became an exclusive by invitation only resort, and in 1937, the B Bar H Ranch opened its resort to the public.

A 1935 ad states "Spend this Winter at the B Bar H Ranch, a California desert resort of the finest character. The West has no finer, more delightful place for winter relaxation than the B Bar H. Located in the midst of the desert beauties, you'll find quiet and rest, or thrilling sports and diversions...tennis, swimming, hunting, golf, hiking, camping, sun-bathing... and above all, exhilarating desert riding. Individual cottages... with the appointments and comforts of the finest hotels, but true to the traditions of the West. Select, friendly clientele. Opens Oct. 1st. B bar H Ranch in the Coachella Valley near Palm Springs."

== Celebrity guests ==
The B Bar H Ranch opened to the public in 1937 which was prior to the founding of Desert Hot Springs in 1941. Hollywood celebrities who visited and helped make the resort town of Palm Springs fashionable also vacationed, stayed and played at the B Bar H Ranch.

Palm Springs Historical Society records indicate ranch celebrity guests included many famous people from the Golden Age of Hollywood: Bob Hope, Ray Milland, Bing Crosby, Ronald Colman, Tyrone Power, Joan Crawford, Lionel Barrymore, Irene Dunne, Eleanor Powell, Olivia de Havilland, Joan Fontaine, Gary Cooper, Marlene Dietrich, Robert Taylor, Joseph Selznick, and Darryl Zanuck. Newspaper clippings from the mid-1940s mention gymkhana events included not only calf roping and horse races—saddle and bareback, but also broomstick polo. At a Thanksgiving holiday gymkhana, guest Peter Lorre, vacationing with his wife along with acting couple Phil Harris and Alice Faye, served as the honorary arena director.

== Modern-day ranch ==
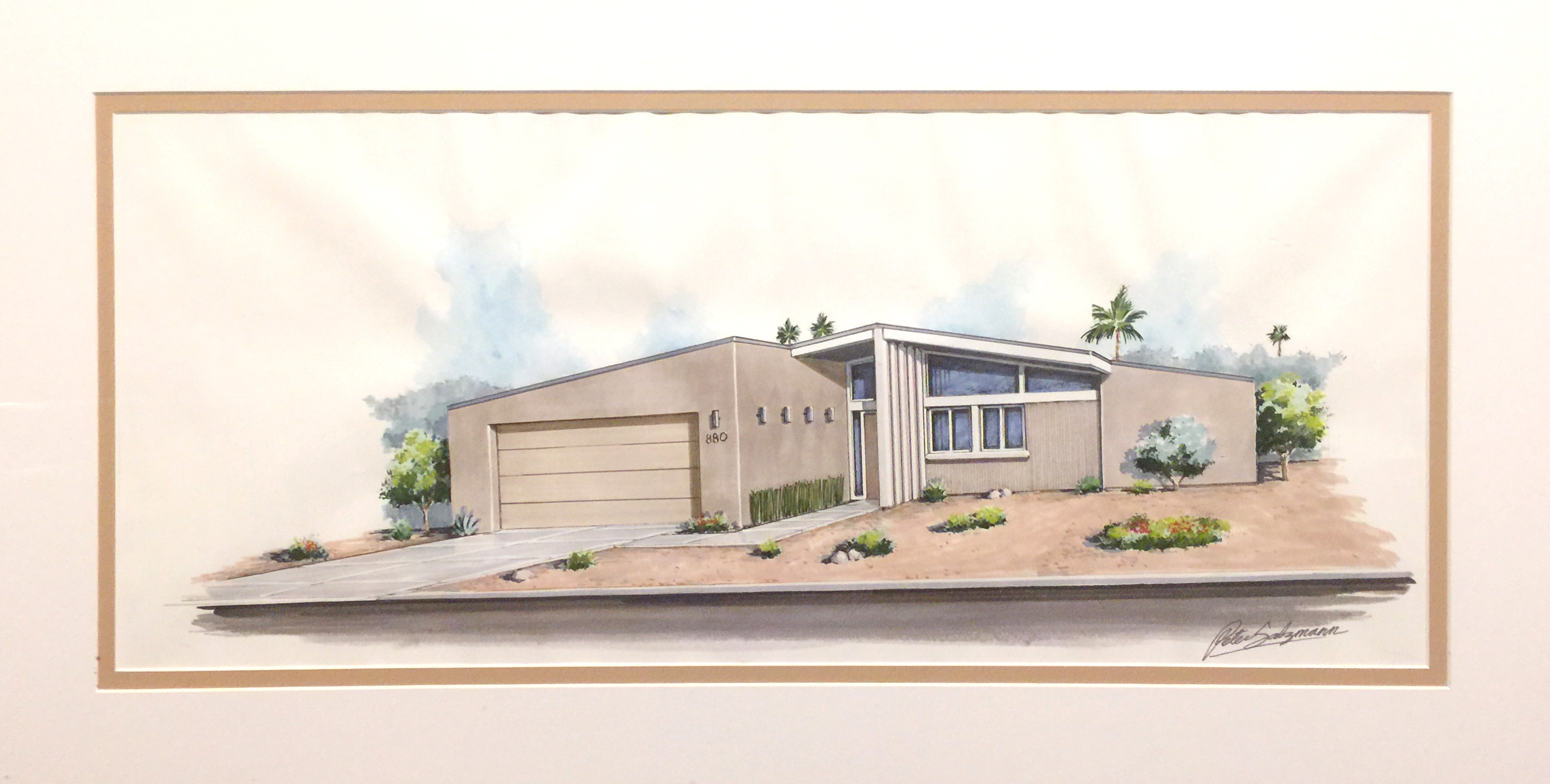
Bellini - Mid-Century Modern Home

In 1940, the Ranch was purchased by Jay Kasler for $42,000, and Kasler closed the Ranch to the public in 1950. In 1978, Lenore "Lee" High purchased the Ranch. Since that time, the Ranch's land has been divided into quarter-acre lots, which were sold and developed.

In 1948, Mary Pickford, a Canadian-born American film actress and producer, built a 7-bedroom, 8-bathroom, and 6,050-square-foot estate on 2.12 acres at the B Bar H Ranch where she lived and then later sold. Pickford was one of the most powerful women who ever worked in Hollywood.

In 1967, developers requested the B Bar H Ranch be made into a mobile home park. The request was denied by the Riverside County Board of Supervisors for the unincorporated area consisting of 550 lots.

In 1972, Veterans of Foreign Wars (VFW) Post 1534 was founded by Joseph Lamar Stone and resides at 1 Clubhouse Drive on the south side of the B Bar H Ranch. The Post is housed inside the B Bar H Ranch's original guest area built in the early-to-mid 1900s. Mary Pickford donated the building to the VFW. It is one of the last VFW Posts in Southern California's Coachella Valley serving Riverside County Desert Cities. This includes and is not limited to Palm Springs, Cathedral City, Desert Hot Springs, La Quinta, Indio, Rancho Mirage, Palm Desert, Indian Wells, unincorporated County areas of Sky Valley, Desert Edge, B Bar H Ranch and other surrounding locations. There are approximately 35,000 veterans within the Coachella Valley.

In 2005, Mark Bodon, a Palm Springs High School graduate, started a Company named Modern Living Spaces, aiming to build unique and sophisticated homes. By 2006, Mr. Bodon built 56 mid-century modern homes on the B Bar H Ranch land. He named the houses after cocktails: Manhattan, Cosmopolitan, Gibson, Brandy Alexander and Bellini. The Bellini was designed using the architectural specifications provided by architect William Krisel who on occasion visited a Bellini home to see the final work.

In 2020, Silver Rock Development, a local construction company co-founded by Ethan Mezrahi and Caroline Mezrahi, constructed 11 mid-century homes within the B Bar H Ranch community. These residences were designed by the architectural firm Bassenian Lagoni. The project added homes to B Bar H Ranch. The homes featured high ceilings, clerestory windows, and angled roof lines.

The original home went up for sale in August 2020.

== Historical landmark ==
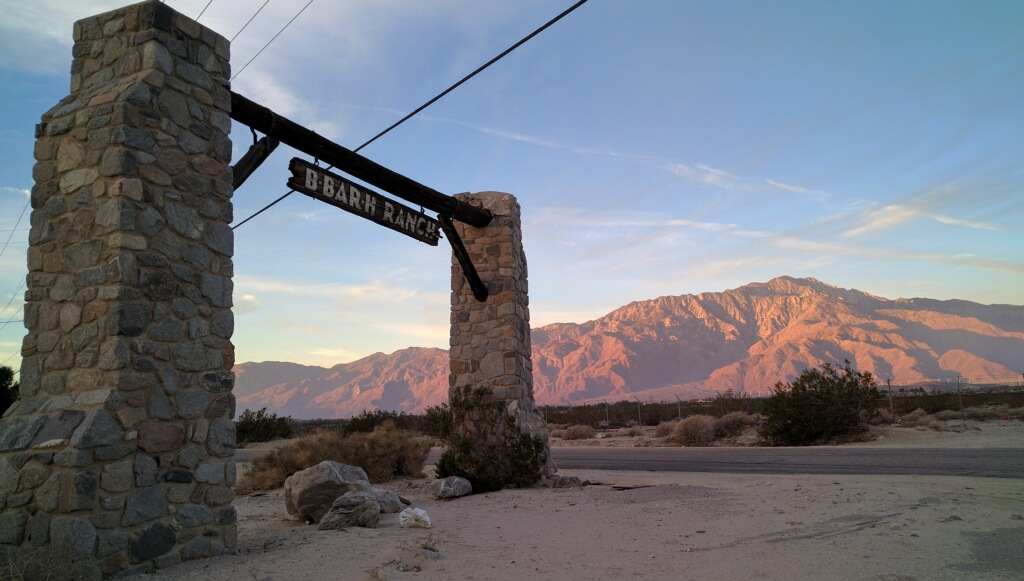
B Bar H Ranch Arch

The B Bar H Ranch Arch was built in 1929 and still stands today. It is one of the last vestiges of the old dude ranch. The B Bar H Ranch Arch located at Bubbling Wells Road and El Serape Trail, marks what used to be the entrance to one of Southern California desert's finest winter getaways.

The B Bar H Ranch Arch is a local artifact for surrounding cities. The Arch recently was the cover of a publication named Desert Hot Springs written by the Desert Hot Springs Historical Society. The publication identifies the Ranch and its Arch to be a part of Desert Hot Springs history. The Ranch, its history and its artifacts, is a historical part of Riverside County Unincorporated. The Palm Springs Historical Society first documented the Ranch's historical events dating back to its beginning in 1927.

In 1929, the B Bar H Ranch Arch was designed and built for horses and horse back riders. The Arch is not designed for today's car and truck traffic. As reported in The Desert Sun from Palm Springs, California on July 29, 2007, someone driving near the Arch hit (and run) the stone structure, causing significant damage. The residents of the North side of the B Bar H Ranch gathered to make the repairs.
