= Duroville =

Former development in Coachella Valley, California

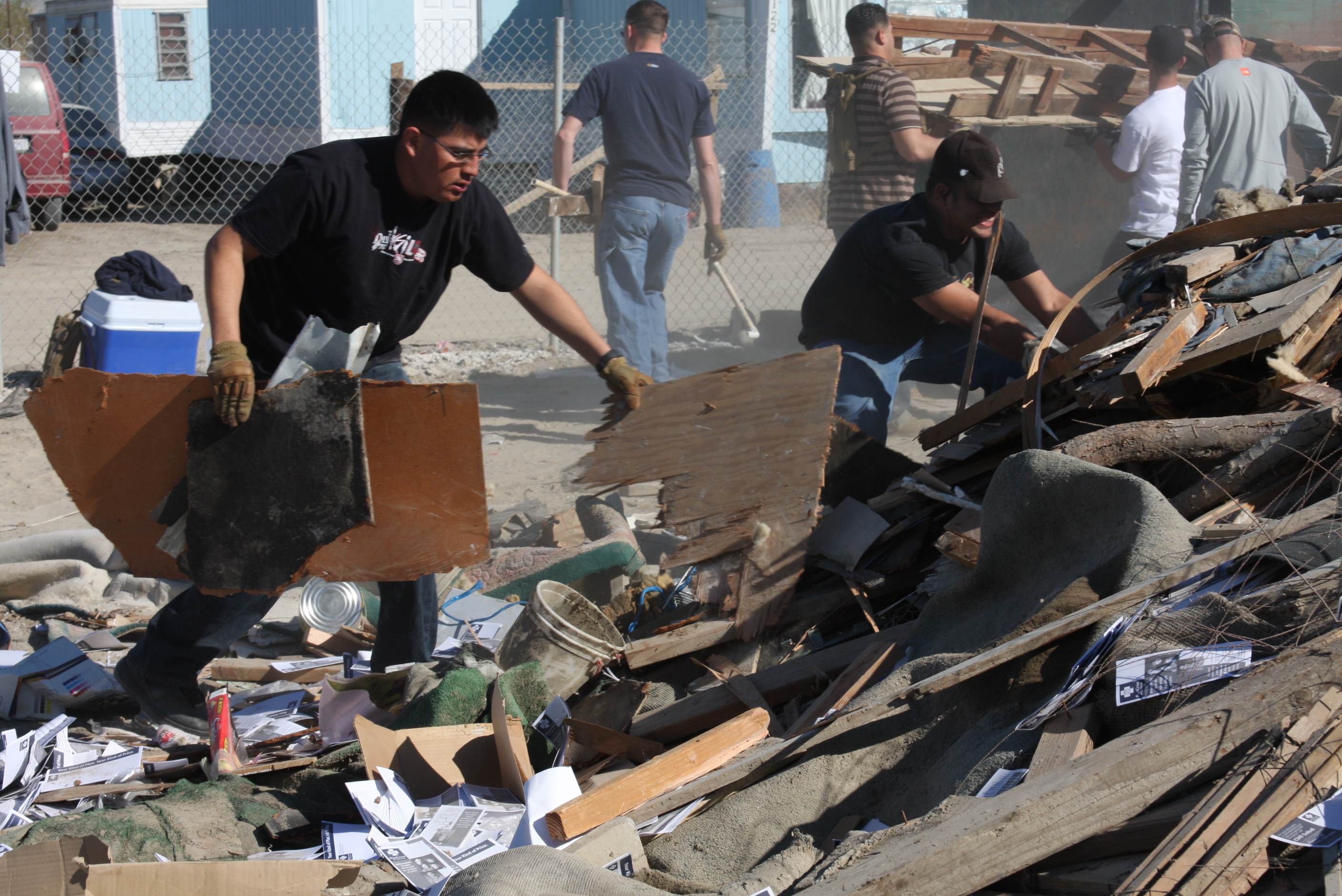
- U.S. Marines participating in a cleanup of Duroville in January 2009

- Location within southern California Duroville (California) Duroville (the United States)

General information
- Status: Destroyed
- Location: Eastern Coachella Valley, California, U.S.
- Coordinates: 33.5527°N 116.1103°W
- Inaugurated: 1999
- Destroyed: June 30, 2013; 12 years ago
- Owner: Harvey Duro, Sr

Design and construction
- Developer: Harvey Duro, Sr

Duroville is the nickname for the former Desert Mobile Home Park located in the vicinity of Mecca, California. It was infamous for its poor living conditions, substantial poverty, predatory packs of wild dogs, and rampant waste. Duroville garnered a great deal of attention, which resulted in some aid to its residents. Conditions in Duroville were reported in the Los Angeles Times and The New York Times. It is one of several hundred trailer parks, both licit and illicit, catering to the same demographic of migrant farm workers in the region.

== Location and condition ==
The trailer park sat on the Torres Martinez Indian Reservation, and is nicknamed for property owner Harvey Duro, Sr., a member of the tribal council. Duro set the park up after several other sub-standard trailer parks in the area were closed by authorities in Riverside County, and residents had no place to live. Duro was unable to obtain Bureau of Indian Affairs (BIA) approval for a lease for the site of Duroville, and received no financial or other assistance from the BIA in licensing or setting up the facility. The BIA channeled its efforts into action in the United States District Court for the Central District of California, asking that the trailer park be closed.

The trailer park, established in 1999, was adjacent to a smoldering dump, which is closed and has been subject to recurrent fires. About 4,000 migrant Mexican farm workers live in several hundred dilapidated mobile homes on 40 acres (16 ha). The condition of the park, with its unsafe trailers, dangerous electrical wiring, faulty septic systems and predatory packs of wild dogs, has been the subject of national attention in recent years. An estimated 65% of residents, about 2,000 people, are Purépecha, an indigenous people from the Mexican state of Michoacán, many from the town of Ocumicho.

== Litigation ==
Litigation brought by the Bureau of Indian Affairs to have the park closed and its residents relocated was unsuccessful. In a decision rendered on May 1, 2009 U.S. District Judge Stephen G. Larson ruled for the benefit of the tenants, claiming that relocating them "would create one of the largest forced migrations in the history of this state." He went on to compare the resulting migration to Japanese-American relocations to Manzanar after the United States' entry into World War II. The court recognized the deficiencies at the park, removed Duro from its management, and appointed a receiver. The federal district court retains jurisdiction and continues to review the matter.

== Redevelopment ==
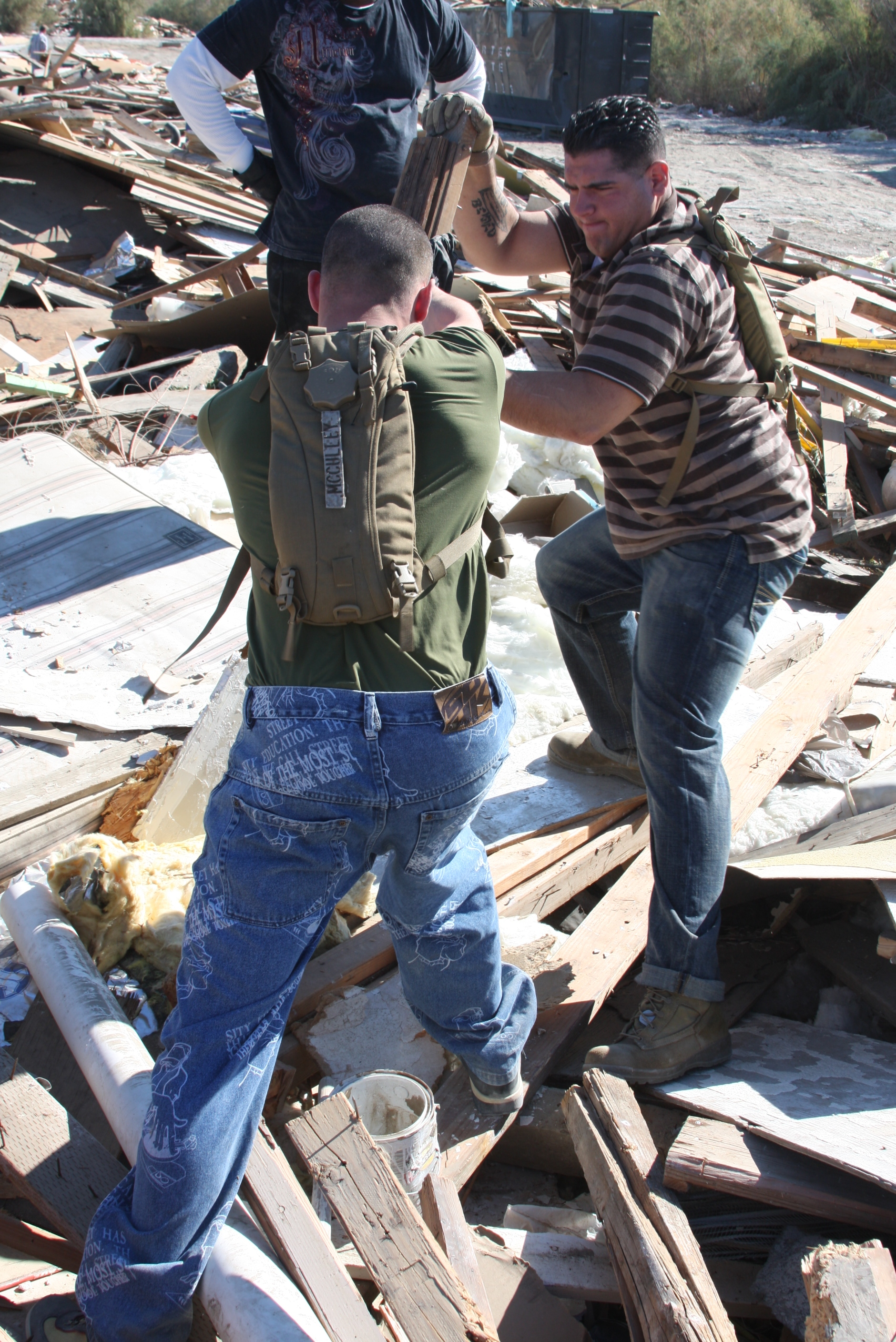
Lance Cpl. Brandon McCulley works with a fellow Marine to help clear away the wooden planks throughout the dump site. The Marines and sailors were teamed up with a handful of civilians to help clear away the debris from Duroville on January 31, 2009.

The district court judge, now retired, continued his interest by sometimes visiting the community. The court-appointed receiver, speaking in 2010, reported considerable progress in mitigating conditions, for example, 400 dogs were neutered or spayed, and 145 adopted. Efforts by the community with outside assistance have greatly improved conditions, however, raw sewage still drains directly from a system of plastic pipes into an open lagoon. Riverside County plans to use federal and state redevelopment funds to facilitate better mobile home facilities nearby, collapsed in 2012 due to loss of funds resulting from the 2008–12 California budget crisis. California redevelopment agencies, which sometimes used funds for unnecessary projects but also for badly needed housing, had been shut down. Plans for relocation are further complicated by the illegal status of some of the workers and reluctance by the Purépecha people to break up their community.

== Closure ==
Duroville was closed on June 30, 2013 by court order. Only the mobile-home park’s owner, Harvey Duro, and his family members can stay. Many of the former residents are now settled in Mountain View Estates, a 181-unit mobile home park six miles away that was built as replacement housing for Duroville. Mountain View Estates was funded by $26 million in state, federal, private and county redevelopment money to build the park and buy the mobile homes. Other Duroville residents moved to subsidized or market-rate apartments, houses or mobile homes. Most of the mobile homes left at Duroville have been demolished.
