= Cathedral city (disambiguation) =

Cathedral city is a city status in the United Kingdom.

Cathedral city may also refer to:

- Cathedral City, California, a city in Southern California, United States
- Cathedral City Cheddar, a brand of Cheddar cheese
- Cathedral City High School, a high school in Cathedral City, California

== See also ==
- Cathedraltown, Ontario
