= North Palm Springs, California =

Unincorporated community in California, United States

- Unincorporated community
- Location within California Location within the United States
- Coordinates: 33°55′22″N 116°32′35″W
- Country: United States
- State: California
- County: Riverside
- Elevation: 863 ft (263 m)
- Time zone: UTC-8 (Pacific (PST))
  - Summer (DST): UTC-7 (PDT)
- ZIP code: 92258
- Area codes: 442/760
- GNIS feature ID: 1656584

North Palm Springs is an unincorporated community in Riverside County, California, United States. North Palm Springs is located at the intersection of Dillon Road and North Indian Canyon Drive near the northern border of Palm Springs, north of Interstate 10.
