= La Paz–Wikenburg Road =

Historic Arizona Territory wagon & stagecoach route

La Paz–Wikenburg Road was a 131-mile-long (211 km) wagon road from 1863 and from 1866 a stagecoach route between the Colorado River landings at La Paz, Olive City and Mineral City to the mining town of Wickenburg, Arizona. From Wickenburg roads led to other new mining camps and districts in the interior of Arizona Territory. From 1862, when the river changed its course, La Paz was isolated on the slough of the old river channel over four miles (6.4 km) from the new river channel. In 1866, the road head changed to the new river landing of Ehrenburg, where the Bradshaw Trail wagon and stagecoach road from San Bernardino, California, crossed the Colorado River at Bradshaw's Ferry.

La Paz–Wikenburg Road, Arizona Territory From landings and Bradshaw's Ferry crossings of Mineral City, Olive City, and La Paz, to Wikenburg
| Location | Distance between stations | | Cumulative distance | |
| Location | Miles | Kilometers | Miles | Kilometers |
|---|---|---|---|---|
| Mineral City, Arizona Territory Bradshaw's Ferry 1864–1866 | 0.0 | 0.0 | 0.0 | 0.0 |
| Ehrenberg, Arizona Territory Bradshaw's Ferry from 1866 | 0.5 | 0.8 | 0.5 | 0.8 |
| Olive City, Arizona Territory Bradshaw's Ferry 1862–1864 | 0.5 | 0.8 | 1.0 | 1.6 |
| La Paz, Arizona Territory 1862–1869 | 4.5 | 7.2 | 5.5 | 8.9 |
| Tyson's Wells, Arizona Territory (1863–1880) | 20.0 | 32.2 | 25.5 | 41.0 |
| Desert Station (1866–1880) Ranegras Plain | 25.0 | 40.2 | 50.5 | 81.3 |
| Granite Water (1863–1866) Granite Wash Pass, Arizona Territory | 9.3 | 15.0 | 59.8 | 96.2 |
| Flint's, Arizona Territory (1866–1880) Centennial Wash | 9.7 | 15.6 | 69.5 | 111.8 |
| McMullen's Wells, Arizona Territory (1863–1866) McMullen's (1866–1880) Fork of road, 55 miles to Date Creek here. | 4.0 | 6.4 | 73.5 | 118.3 |
| Cullens Well, Arizona Territory Fork of road, 36 miles to Date Creek, 46.5 miles to Wickenburg here. | 10.0 | 16.1 | 83.5 | 134.4 |
| Blank Tank, Arizona Territory (1863–1866) Kings Wells, (1866–1880) | 9.0 | 14.5 | 92.5 | 148.9 |
| Wickenburg Massacre site, Arizona Territory | 29.5 | 47.5 | 122.0 | 196.3 |
| Wickenburg, Arizona Territory (1863– ) | 8.0 | 12.9 | 130.0 | 209.2 |
