= William D. Bradshaw =

Early western U.S. pioneer (1826–1864)

- Born: William David Bradshaw; 1826; Buncombe County, North Carolina, U.S.
- Died: December 2, 1864 (aged 37–38); La Paz County, Arizona, U.S.
- Cause of death: Throat slashed
- Burial place: Mineral City, Arizona, U.S.
- Other names: Big Bill Bradshaw, Bunk Bradshaw

William D. Bradshaw (1826–1864) was a United States western pioneer and prospector. He is best remembered for forging the Bradshaw Trail in 1862 from San Bernardino, California, to La Paz in the New Mexico Territory. Initially this gave the populated areas of California's west coast a more direct route to the Colorado River Gold Rush fields, but more importantly the trail opened up the Southern California Colorado Desert region, and beyond, to settlement and development.

As part of the trail, and in partnership with William Warringer, on June 16, 1862, Bradshaw set up a ferry service to cross the Colorado River. The ferry transported travelers across the river from a location called Providence Point in California, to La Paz in the New Mexico territory.

Bradshaw died in Mineral City on December 2, 1864, after his throat was slashed with a drawknife. Newspaper reports at the time stated Bradshaw had committed suicide. Given the nature of his death, and lack of known witnesses, historians, such as Francis J. Johnston, think he was likely murdered.

== Early life ==
Bradshaw's parents, Christopher Bradshaw and Mary Elizabeth Davis, were married in Greene County, Tennessee, in 1806. They later moved their family to Buncombe County, North Carolina, where William was born in 1826. Later in life, William was given the nickname Bunk for his beginnings in Buncombe County. William was one of twelve siblings, 5 boys, and 7 girls. The family moved to Missouri around 1845, and shortly after, William, along with three of his brothers, took the Oregon Trail West. In Fort Laramie, Wyoming his oldest brother, John, died of Cholera.

Exactly how and when the brothers made their way to California is not certain, but the next documented story relating to William takes place in Sonoma, California. In 1846, a time when Alta California was still under Mexican rule, Bradshaw had been hired to build a picket fence for the Mexican Army post under the supervision of Captain Salvador Vallejo. When Vallejo was critical of Bradshaw's work, and swatted Bradshaw with the flat of his sword, Bradshaw struck back with a picket, and knocked the captain to the ground. Fearing the consequences, Bradshaw fled to the Sacramento Valley.

== The Bear Flag Rebellion ==
In April 1846 Bradshaw returned to the Sonoma area and joined California's Bear Flag Rebellion, a group intending to overthrow Mexican rule and establish an independent California Republic. When the Bear Flaggers captured the fort at Sonoma on June 14, 1846, Captain Salvador Vallejo was one of those captured. Initially fearing vengeance related to the earlier picket fence incident, Vallejo's concerns were allayed when Bradshaw told him that he felt all accounts had been settled at the time.

There are conflicting stories regarding the details of what happened that day, particularly with the respect to the Bear Flag. Bradshaw's own accounts have been viewed with skepticism. His description of the flag, both the size and the motto, do not agree with what is known about the actual flag. Whatever his role in the Bear Flag Rebellion, the following account of Bradshaw was reported in the Pacific Echo newspaper on September 7, 1861;

"In 1846, a party of 33 men took the post of Sonoma; the Mexican flag was taken down, and it was proposed that we should have a flag of our own. I went to Marcus Baca's store and bought nine yards of bleached domestic; this was torn in twain and sewed together, making a flag 6 feet broad and 13 ½ feet long, upon which Wm. Todd and myself painted a bear, a lone star, and wrote the words "The Invincible." After we were disbanded, most of us joined Uncle Sam, and having the greater right in the flag, I made a present of it to the son of Capt. Montgomery, of the Portsmouth, then laying in the harbor at Yerba Buena." – Wm. D. Bradshaw

After the revolt, records show Bradshaw did join the U.S. military, or Uncle Sam as he put it. He was reported to be a Lieutenant in John C. Frémont's battalion in 1847.

== California's French Revolution ==
A June, 1851, incident in Mokelumne Hill has been dubbed California's French Revolution, or French War, by some historians. The previous year the State Legislature had passed the Foreign Miners' Tax Act of 1850. Frenchmen in the area revolted and refused to pay the tax. The Sheriff, also the Tax Collector, summoned a large posse to enforce the act, but the Frenchmen raised the French flag and proclaimed their independence. This prompted the Governor to direct a battalion of militia, commanded by Bradshaw, to suppress the revolt. Disaster was averted when Bradshaw negotiated with the Frenchmen to stand down.

== Places named for the Bradshaw brothers ==
Traditionally, it was thought that the following places were named in recognition of William Bradshaw. Some historians have proposed that Bradshaw City, and the Bradshaw Mountains, were named for William's brother, Isaac. Roscoe G. Willson laid out the argument in favor of Isaac in the Arizona Republic in 1956, and again in 1969.

- Bradshaw City, Arizona
  - Bradshaw City Cemetery
- Bradshaw's Ferry
- Bradshaw Mining District, a gold mining area in the Bradshaw Mountains
- Bradshaw Mountains
  - Bradshaw Mountain High School
  - Bradshaw Mountain Middle School, in the Humboldt Unified School District
  - Bradshaw Mountain Railroad
- Bradshaw Ranger District, an administrative division of the Prescott National Forest
- Bradshaw Spring
- Bradshaw Trail
