= Wetback =

Wetback may refer to:

- Wetback (slur), a derogatory term used primarily in the United States for Mexicans
- Wetback: The Undocumented Documentary, a 2005 film about undocumented immigration to Canada
- Operation Wetback, a project of the United States Immigration and Naturalization Service that deported about 1 million Mexican immigrants in 1954
- Wetback heater, or back boiler, a type of water heater
- Wetbacks (film), a 1956 American crime film

== See also ==
- Wetback Tank, a reservoir in New Mexico
