= Bradshaw's Ferry =

Crossing point on the Colorado River

- Location within Arizona
- 33°36′17.0″N 114°31′50.2″W
- Type: Cultural
- Location: Border of California and Arizona, United States

Site notes
- Owner: William D. Bradshaw

Bradshaw's Ferry was a ferry at the crossing point on the Colorado River, of the Bradshaw Trail at Olive City and later at Mineral City and Ehrenburg, between what was then San Diego County, California, and Arizona County, New Mexico Territory. The ferry connected the Bradshaw Trail to the road to the gold placers of La Paz, the first big strike of the Colorado River Gold Rush. From 1863, the La Paz - Wikenburg Road connected the Bradshaw Trail to the new mining boom town settlements in the interior of Arizona Territory.

== History ==
Bradshaw's Ferry was established by William D. Bradshaw soon after he had discovered the route of the Bradshaw Trail when he made a partnership with William Warringer of La Paz to establish a ferry on Providence Point, across the river from Olive City and the road to nearby La Paz. Williams returned to Los Angeles and published an announcement in the Los Angeles Star of the new road between San Gorgonio Pass he had established and of the ferry to the goldfields at the end of the trail.

On November 7, 1864, the Territorial Legislature permitted the ferry, now in Yuma County, Arizona Territory, to charge $4.00 for a wagon and 2 horses, $3.00 for a carriage and 1 horse, $1.00 for saddle horse, $0.50 for a man afoot, $0.50 a head for cattle and horses, $0.25 a head for sheep. It was authorized to operate ferries at any and every point between Mineral City and five miles above La Paz for up to twenty years. At first the ferry operated at Olive City then in 1864 at Mineral City, and lastly at Ehrenburg from 1866 when it replaced the two other settlements. William Bradshaw himself left operations of the ferry to his brother Issac and died in 1864, officially a suicide, but possibly a murder. Issac Bradshaw sold out his interest in 1867.
