= Olive City, Arizona =

- Ghost town
- Location within Arizona Location within the United States
- Coordinates: 33°36′40″N 114°31′33″W
- Country: United States
- State: Arizona
- County: La Paz
- Founded: 1863, before Arizona was officially declared a territory by President Abraham Lincoln
- Abandoned: 1866
- Elevation: 266 ft (81 m)

Population (2009)
  - Total: 0
- Time zone: UTC-7 (MST (no DST))

Olive City, or Olivia, was a short-lived town, steamboat landing, and ferry crossing on the Colorado River in what was then Yuma County, Arizona Territory, from 1863 to 1866. It was located on the Arizona bank of the Colorado River, 1 mile above its rival Mineral City and 1/2 mile above the original site of Ehrenberg, Arizona, 3 miles southwest of the location of La Paz. The GNIS location of Olive City (historical) is indicated as being in La Paz County, Arizona, but its coordinates in the present-day now put it across the river just within Riverside County, California. Olive City was named after Olive Oatman who had been, with her sister, survivors of the massacre of her family and a captive of the Yavapai until purchased from them by the Mohave who they lived with for several years.

== History ==
In 1862, the great flood of that year, changed the course of the Colorado River cutting off the gold boomtown of La Paz, from the course of the river which had moved away from the town by 2 miles. There the following spring a new landing developed, named Olivia, later Olive City. La Paz was left beside the old river course now a slough, connected to the river near Olive City.

The founders of this new town were mostly sympathetic to the cause of the Confederacy, and would not sell lots in the new town to Blacks, Chinese, Native Americans, Indians from India, and Mexicans who were a majority in the town of La Paz. In March 1863, miners at Olivia also formed a separate mining district, the Weaver District, that tried to restrict Mexicans and Native Americans from its mines.

Olivia was the original crossing point for Bradshaw's Ferry.

Olivia was suspected as a staging point for Confederate sympathizers heading east to join in the Civil War. Also on May 20, 1863, nearby La Paz was the site of the La Paz Incident where a Confederate sympathizer shot and killed two Union soldiers traveling up river to Fort Mohave on the steamer Cocopah that were there to purchase supplies. To break up this activity a detachment of union infantry from Fort Mohave set up a camp halfway between La Paz and Olivia in September 1863.

In the fall of 1864, Mineral City and landing was established a mile down the river and Bradshaw's Ferry was moved there, to the detriment of Olive City.

In 1866, a new landing was established between Olive City and Mineral City, with the support of two steamboat captains of the George A. Johnson Company. Mineral City became the name of this larger settlement, resulting in the abandonment of Olive City and by 1870 La Paz also after the placer mines gave out. In 1870 Mineral City was renamed Ehrenburg.

Across the river was the former town site of Donlon in California, now a recreational park within the city limits of Blythe, it served as a river port when the Colorado River was navigable down to the Gulf of California connecting agricultural-based trade with the Pacific Ocean.

In nearby Ehrenberg, there is a historic cemetery, including the first settlers of multiple European and other ethnicities, such as Jewish-Americans whose graves have piles of stones, a Jewish burial custom.

=== Current ===
Because of the subsequent changes of the rivers course, the site of Olivia or Olive City, Arizona is today stranded in Riverside County, California across the river from modern Ehrenburg in La Paz County, Arizona. Nothing remains of the old settlement.
