= Greaser Act =

California state law

The Anti-Vagrancy Act, also known as the Greaser Act, was enacted in 1855 in California, legalizing the arrest of those perceived as violating its anti-vagrancy statute.

The law is sometimes referred to as the Greaser Act because the law uses the word "Greaser", found in section two, to refer to individuals of "Spanish and Indian blood."

== Historical context ==
The end of the Mexican–American War in 1848 was marked by the Treaty of Guadalupe Hidalgo, which resulted in Mexico's cession of the Southwest, leading to the United States' acquisition of California, Colorado, Nevada, New Mexico, Texas, Utah, Arizona, and Wyoming. As elaborated by Latino History and Culture: An Encyclopedia, "Euro-Americans were eager to solidify their power in the region they had just taken from Mexico," and thus began to construct a legal and economic system to develop the Southwest.

California underwent much development during the late 1840s and early 1850s, especially due to the economic boom produced by the gold rush between the years 1840 and 1855. Some have characterized the sentiments of this era as being a consequence of the economic development; for example, scholar Leonard Pitt has described that "nativism was born in the months of 1849 and early 1850 when mining enterprise was most individualistic, government most ineffectual, and immigration most rapid."

Tensions mounted in the region, catalyzing both vigilante justice and legal discrimination against minority groups to retain European American interests in the region. The Greaser Act is part of a history of anti-immigration (e.g. Chinese Exclusion Act) and discriminatory laws passed in the Southwest (e.g. Foreign Miners' Tax). The Foreign Miners' Tax of 1850, which called for all non-European non-citizen miners to pay a tax in order to work in the mines, can be considered "a system of taxation and indenture...to exploit alien caste laborers rather than expel them."

Under "An Act for the Government and Protection of Indians", passed in 1850, Native Americans in California were targeted under the guise of stopping vagrancy and promoting apprenticeship. As outlined by the California Research Bureau of the California State Library, the act "facilitated removing California Indians from their traditional lands, separating at least a generation of children and adults from their families, languages, and cultures...and indenturing Indian children and adults to Whites." The Anti-Vagrancy Act of 1855 extended the vagrancy statutes to non-Native Americans in a less severe manner.

== Content of the Anti-Vagrancy Act of 1855 ==
The original title of the act clearly states that its purpose is "To punish Vagrants, Vagabonds, and Dangerous and Suspicious Persons." Six short sections outline the punishment at first incident, the protocol for disarming greasers, the consequences of a second conviction, the potential avenues of employment for vagrant, the discharge procedures and the timeline for when the act is to go into effect. The law defined a vagrant as including all those who do not have or accept employment, prostitutes and drunkards and calls for their incarceration for up to ninety days; during this time they may be "sentenced to hard labor."

Section 2 identifies people by ethnoracial background by referring to "all persons who are commonly known as 'Greasers' or the issue of Spanish and Indian blood... and who go armed and are not peaceable and quiet persons." The word "greaser" (a vestige of the Mexican–American War) was a derogatory term used to refer to Mexicans and Mexican Americans referring to "the practice of Mexican laborers in the Southwest greasing their backs to facilitate the unloading of hides and cargo," their skin color, or presumptions about their hygiene.

== Impact in California ==
Discriminatory actions created by the California legislature in the 1850s socially and economically restrained minority groups, and in many ways the Greaser Act, "criminalized everyday behavior and wrote racist language into the law of California" as a way for Anglo-Americans to control the new rising economy.

The Anti-Vagrancy Act, as well as laws of its time such as the Foreign Miners' Tax, kept minority groups out of the growing mining economy, by restricting and controlling the laboring bodies of minorities and claiming that labor and productivity would serve to reform idle individuals. Some scholars have argued that the vagrancy act is an example of "internal colonialism" because "this law was an attempt to reintroduce the peon bondage system, which provided cheap labor to the ranchos that existed in California prior to the Anglo immigration." This is an example of how Mexicans "were nevertheless subject to laws designed to deny them the privileges and status of whiteness, based on their working-class position," complicating how race and citizenship were understood in the region.

The distinction between 'native' and 'foreigner' played a crucial and central difference in the racism and discrimination emblematic of the Southwest during the time period. The stigma of 'foreigner' was detrimental to the economic and social opportunities of minorities, as discrimination and oppression affected many groups of people, including Mexicans/Mexican Americans, Asians/Asian Americans, and Native Americans. These laws, however, did not affect African Americans, for "their citizenship and socialization in American society as 'native,' were exempt from both the Foreign Miners' Tax and the Greaser Act." Although they were exempt from these California laws because of their native status, they still faced "a multitude of egregious laws in their own right." Therefore, racial discrimination was additionally complicated by nativism and understandings of citizenship.

The Greaser Act was in line with other forms of extra-legal violence imparted on minorities during this time period: "the law authorized local militias to keep the Mexican community at bay by terrorizing its members; allowed Anglos to confiscate Mexican property; and even allowed Anglos to lynch 'recalcitrant individuals' with impunity." As described by Guevara Urbina, "residents continued to face displacement from their land as European newcomers began to use violence, lynching, existing laws, or developed new laws, to seize lands previously held by Mexicans or other indigenous groups."

Additionally, the law played a role in the racial formation of Mexicans "from a nationality to a race...through the dynamic interplay of myriad social forces...racialization of Mexicans does not occur in a vacuum, but in the context of dominant ideology, perceived economic interests, and psychological necessity."

== Changes to the Act ==
The Greaser Act of 1855 would be later amended a year after its passage. However, the law was still used against US citizens of Mexican ancestry, Mexican nationals and other foreign groups. The amendment came in the form of eliminating the word "Greaser" from the text of the law, but it was still used against Mexicans. Though this changed over time, the discriminatory actions of the 1800s barred not only Mexicans and Mexican Americans, but also Native Americans and Asian Americans. Today, profiling laws bar "enforcement agencies from reliance on ethnicity, color, national origin, political affiliation, language, sexual orientation, gender, gender identity, disabilities or medical conditions as a reason to stop or search people." The Anti-Vagrancy Act exists in a broader history within California regarding immigration, nativism, and race relations, both before and after repeal of the act.

== See also ==
- Emigration from Mexico
- Immigration to the United States
- Mexican Repatriation
- Operation Gatekeeper
- Operation Wetback

== Sources ==
- California Statutes. Chapter 175 (1855), p. 217
- Ronald Takaki. A Different Mirror (pp. 178, 457 fn. 32), Little Brown & Co. (1993)
- Tomas Almaguer. Racial Faultlines: The Historical Origins of White Supremacy in California (pp. 57, 228 fn. 36), University of California Press (1994)
- Steven W. Bender. Excerpt, Greasers & Gringos: Latinos, Law & the American Imagination (NYU Press), 2003.
- Ken Gonzales-Day. Lynching in the West, 1850-1935, Duke University Press (2006).
