= Chandler roundup =

1997 Arizona mass arrest of suspected illegal immigrants

- Operation Restoration
- Date: July 27–31, 1997
- Location: Chandler, Arizona; 33°18′N 111°50′W
- Goals: Deporting illegal immigrants
- Methods: Patrols, arrests
- Result: 432 deportations, civil rights lawsuits, police chief reprimanded

Casualties
- Arrested: 432
- Location within Arizona

The Chandler roundup was a law enforcement operation in Chandler, Arizona, in 1997 in which hundreds of suspected illegal immigrants were arrested. In 2004 hearings of the U.S. Senate, it was described as "the only major ethnic profiling incident actually related to immigration".

== Details ==
The operation was known at the time as "Operation Restoration", and was a joint operation between local law enforcement officers and federal authorities. Over five days in the summer of 1997, from July 27 to July 31, officers on bicycles patrolled Chandler asking suspected Hispanic people for proof of citizenship, and arresting those who could not provide proof. All said, 432 illegal immigrants were arrested in Chandler and later deported. However, many U.S. citizens and legal residents were also stopped and arrested, largely on the basis of their skin color, leading Arizona Attorney General Grant Woods to concede that their civil rights had been violated.

== Analysis ==
A precise count of the number of people affected by the raid is not available because the INS does not collect data on the number of people who were stopped but later determined to be legally in the U.S. The investigations that followed the roundup focused on a set of 91 formal complaints filed by 71 different people concerning incidents during the raid in which they were stopped and asked for papers. Of these 91 incidents, 23 led to arrests; three of the arrestees were found to be illegal immigrants. The other 20 arrestees were a mix of U.S. citizens and legal immigrants, and were eventually released. Romero writes that "all were of Mexican ancestry or Latino" and that there is no record of any white person being detained in the raid.

== Aftermath ==
The lawsuits arising from the civil rights violations caused by the operation led to costly settlements. Police chief Bobby Joe Harris was reprimanded for the manner in which the raid was conducted, and the incident led to a recall bid against the mayor of Chandler and two city council members.

== Related cases ==
Arizona SB1070, a 2010 law requiring local law-enforcement officers to check the documentation of suspected illegal aliens, has been compared to the Chandler Roundup by critics who predict that the new law will lead to similar civil rights violations.

== See also ==
- Mexican Repatriation
- Operation Wetback
- Racism in the United States
- Fourth Amendment to the United States Constitution
