= 4th California Infantry Regiment =

4th California Volunteer Infantry
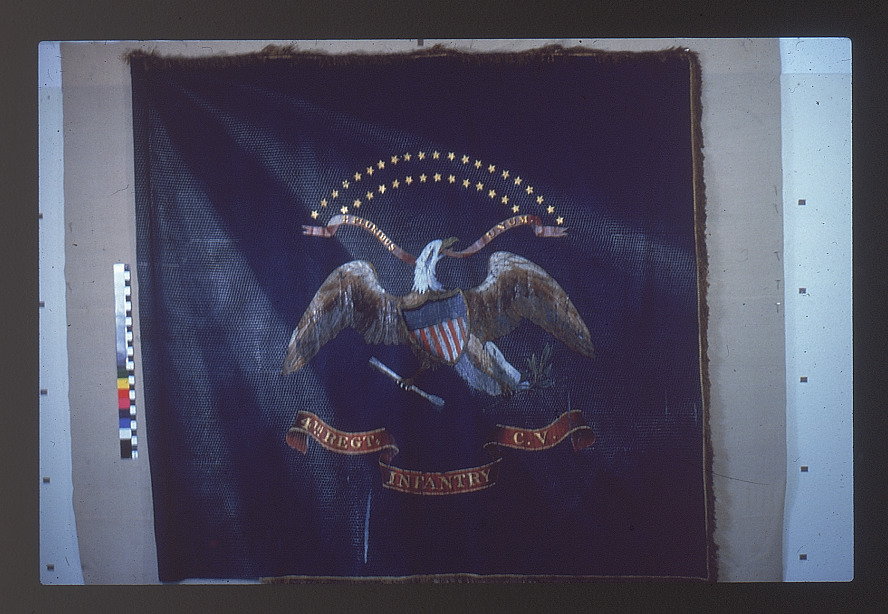
- Regimental color of the regiment
- Active: September 1861 to April 18, 1866
- Country: United States
- Allegiance: Union
- Branch: Infantry
- Engagements: American Civil War: La Paz incident (Co. H); Occupation of Santa Catalina Island (Co. C); The Killing of Augustus Quinton (Co.A)

The 4th California Infantry was a volunteer infantry regiment recruited from Northern California during the American Civil War. It was organized in Sacramento, Placerville, and Auburn in September and October 1861.

== History ==
The regiment was originally organized in 1861. Most of the recruits, caught up in war fever, expected to be sent to the eastern battlefields. They were disappointed to be instead ordered to garrison duty and related tasks on the West Coast, where they spent the remainder of their enlistments. The regiment served principally in the District of Oregon (Oregon and Washington Territory) and in the District of Southern California. However, some companies were shifted to Arizona later in the war. None of these duties required regimental strength, so the companies of the regiment were detached and scattered. The last elements of the regiment were mustered out on April 18, 1866.

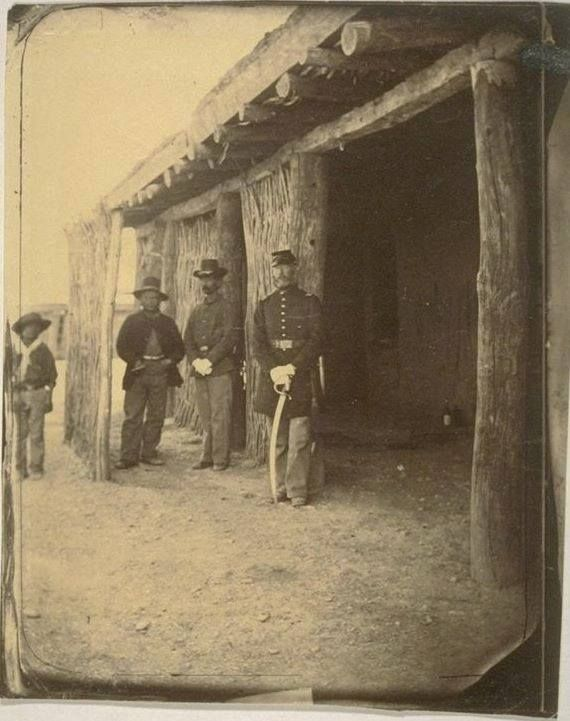
Captain Charles Atchison of Company I at Fort Mohave, Arizona Territory

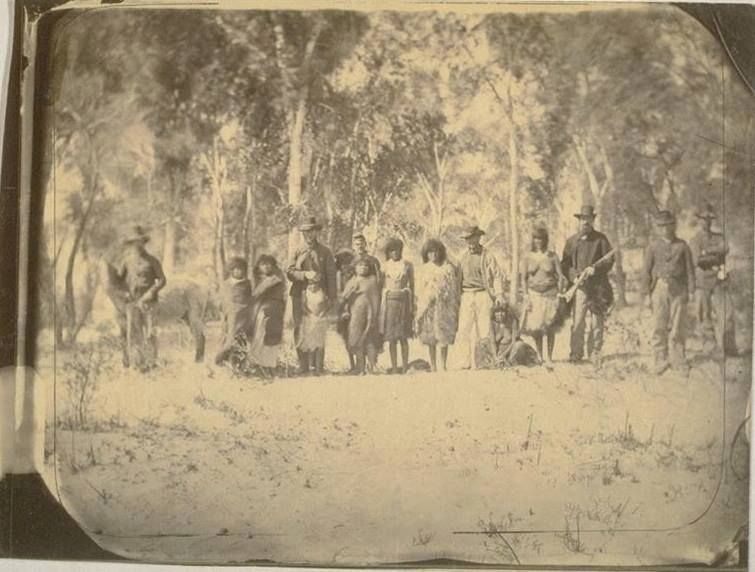
Soldiers with Native Americans at Fort Mohave

== Commanders ==
- Colonel Henry M. Judah, September 1861 - November, 1861.
- Colonel Ferris Forman, November 1861 - August 20, 1863.
- Colonel James F. Curtis, August 20, 1863 - until it was disbanded by consolidation, November 30, 1865

== Flags ==
The Regimental flag and Company B's flag were the only banners to survive the war and are preserved in the State Capitol. Other flags were taken from newspaper accounts. Most of the company flags were made by locals.

- Regimental colors - The flag was never flown in combat and was given to Governor Frederick Low on November 30, 1865, by Colonel Curtis to be preserved in the Capitol.
- Company A - It was described as "The flag was blue silk, trimmed with silver bullion lace. On one side was the coat of arms of California, on the other the words “Presented by the Ladies of Auburn,” and upon a gilt ground—“'When duty calls, 'tis ours to obey.” It was given to members of the militia before they joined the company in September 1861.
- Company B - The flag was made by the women of Forest Hill and was presented to the company on October 22, 1861.
- Company C - The flag was the stars and stripes made from silk by the women of Placerville in September 1861. It was flown at Santa Catalina Island when the company was stationed there. On April 13, 1866, the flag was given to the ladies of Shasta County by Captain B. R. West.
- Company D - The captain was given a "Large American flag" by the women of Amador County on October 29, 1861.
  Digital reconstruction of Company A flag, per description (Obverse)
  (Reverse)
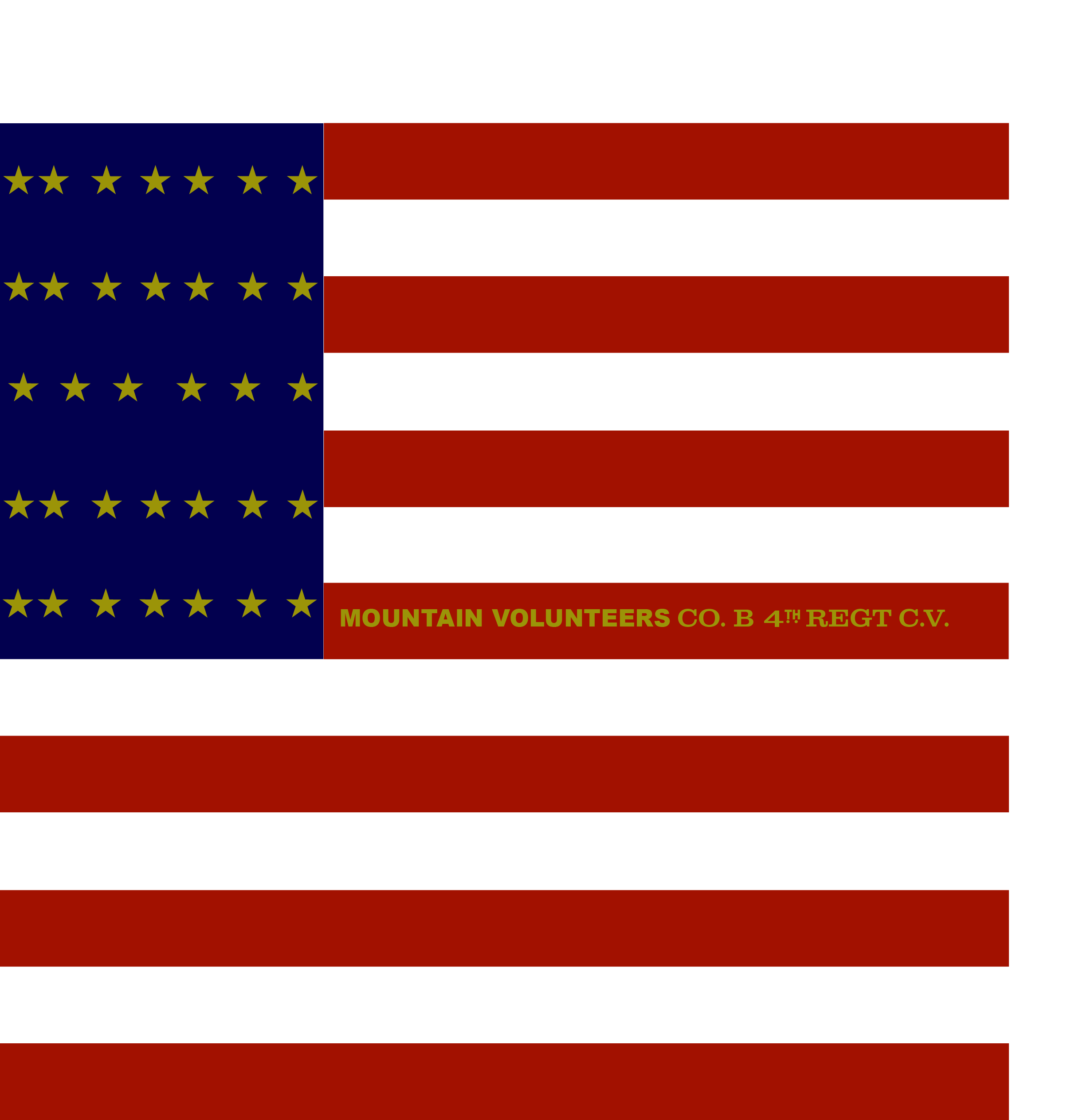
  Digital remake of the National color of Company B,(California State Capitol Museum)

== Company assignments ==
- Regimental headquarters - First located at Auburn, Placer County. While stationed there five companies were sent to the District of Oregon to relieve the regulars stationed there. From February to May, 1862, the headquarters and five companies were at Camp Union, near Sacramento. During the month of May headquarters was moved to Camp Latham, near Los Angeles, where it remained until September, 1862, when it was transferred to Drum Barracks, where it remained for the remainder of the regiment's service.
- Company A - This company was organized at Placerville mostly made up of men from the Auburn Greys militia, September 21, 1861. Moved from San Francisco to Fort Vancouver, Washington Territory, October 29-November 4, 1861. At Fort Walla Walla, Washington Territory, until August, 1862. Ordered to San Francisco August 15 and duty at Benicia Barracks until March, 1863. Ordered to Camp Drum March 1, and duty there until January, 1864. At Santa Barbara until the terms of service of most of the members expired, and they were discharged at Drum Barracks, October 13, 1864.
  - On the night of July 26, 1864 a large group of secessionist were walking thought the streets of North San Juan, Nevada county shouting and cheering for Jefferson Davis, the Confederacy, General Lee, and the rebel flag. The group came along American flag flying from a pole and opened fired on it, with many of the men wishing that they could raised the rebel flag on it. The group also threaten to shoot anyone who interfered with them. The crowd was led by Augustus Quinton, he claimed that he was the "guerrilla chief of California," and was appointment by Jefferson Davis. Upon hearing the actions of the secessionist, Judge Smith of North San Juan issued a warrant for his arrest. It was given to Sheriff Kent who requested his friend Lieutenant Joseph W. Scoby help serve warrant for Augustus Quinton, Deputy Sheriff Jones and a few others later joined the party. Augustus was a notorious secessionist in the county, who served in the Confederate Army and was later captured and paroled before making his way to California. So on the Moring of July 28, 1864, the party went to the house of his father. There are 2 accounts of the shooting, one by the The Nevada Transcript which states that Jones walk to the door and opened it. He was about to walk in before Augustus drew his pistol undeath a pillow and fired. The shot missed and Deputy grabbed Augustus and shot him in the abdomen. Upon hearing the gunshots Augustus's father and brother ran into the room and grabbed Jones by his right armed trying to disarm him. Jones did not let them take his pistol and quickly ran to the door while Augustus unloaded his revolver at him, with none of them landing. Augustus father went after Jones and grabbed his gun while they were on the porch and started shooting at him. Sheriff Kent who was outside soon fired 6 shots at the old man while Lieutenant Scoby only fired once. After a while Augustus passed from his wounds, his brother was arrested and the old man got away. During the shootout the brother was wounded in arm but Sheriff's party was unharmed. The other account from the Sacramento Daily Union states that when the Sheriff's party got to the front of the house a man believed to be Augustus open the door and saw the group and ran back in. Deputy Sheriff Jones quickly followed him inside and yelled "I have a warrant for your arrest." Augustus turned around and pulled a pistol then firing a shot near Jones's face. The Deputy raised his gun and shot only once in the house. Augustus shot 3 more times at Jones all missing. Jones ran out the door with Augustus behind and the gun battle continue outside the house. Augustus was shot twice and later died of his wounds. In both accounts the Sheriff and his party were ruled justified in the shooting.

The company was immediately reformed with the few whose terms had not expired and new recruits. It remained at Santa Barbara until November, 1864. At Cahuenga Pass, November 30, 1864; at Drum Barracks, December, 1864, and January, 1865. Sent during the month of April 1865 to Fort Humboldt. At Camp Iaqua May 1, 1865, until it was ordered to the Presidio of San Francisco, for final muster out on November 30, 1865.

- Company B - Captain Fitch and Lieutenant Copely of the Mountain Volunteers joined this company, which was organized at Placerville, September 25, 1861. They moved from San Francisco to Fort Vancouver, Washington Territory, October 29-November 4, 1861. In January 1862, private Edward was excessively drinking in town when he tried to head back to the fort unnoticed. He was near the gates when he was spotted by a guard. Edwards pulled a knife on the man and in response the guard raised his gun and open fire on Edward, killing him on the spot. At Fort Vancouver until March, 1862. At Fort Dalles to October, 1862. Ordered to San Francisco October 3, and duty at Benicia Barracks until March, 1863. Ordered to Camp Drum March 1, 1863, and then to Fort Mojave April 29, and duty there until June, 1864. Ordered to Drum Barracks, and duty there until mustered out. Like Company A, Company B was reorganized with veterans and recruits and then ordered to Fort Humboldt April 5, 1865, and then to Fort Gaston, and duty there until it was finally mustered out.
- Company C - This company was recruited in Shasta County and was named the Shasta Guards during the month of September, 1861. It was marched to Auburn, Placer County, where it was mustered into the United States service October 5, 1861. Moved from San Francisco to Fort Vancouver, Washington Territory, October 29-November 4, 1861. At Fort Walla Walla, Washington Territory, until August, 1862. Ordered to San Francisco August 14, and duty at Benicia Barracks until March, 1863. At San Francisco until May. Ordered to Camp Drum May 28, 1863, and duty there until January, 1864. Occupation of Santa Catalina Island January 2, and duty at Camp Santa Catalina Island where they raised their company flag until December, 1864. At Drum Barracks until March, 1865, and at Fort Mojave until mustered out.
- Company D - This company was organized at Auburn, Placer County and was named the Volcano Blues. It was mustered into the United States service October 15, 1861. Moved from San Francisco to Fort Vancouver, Washington Territory, October 29-November 4, 1861. At Fort Yamhill, Oregon, until March, 1863. Ordered to Fort Hoskins March 25, and duty there until December, 1864. Expedition from Siletz Block House to Coos Bay April 21-May 12, 1864. At Fort Yamhill until muster out. The company was reorganized and remained at Fort Yamhill. It was finally mustered out at the Presidio, S. F., December 19, 1865.
- Company E - This company was organized at Auburn, Placer County and was named the Trinity Volunteers. It was mustered into the United States service October 10, 1861. Moved from San Francisco to Fort Vancouver, Washington Territory, October 29-November 4, 1861. At Fort Steilacoom until October 3, 1862. Ordered to San Francisco, and duty at Benicia Barracks until May, 1863. Ordered to Drum Barracks May 28, and duty there until January, 1864. At Fort Yuma until June, 1865. At Drum Barracks until muster out.
- Company F - This company was raised in Coloma, El Dorado County, in September, and was mustered into the United States service at Auburn, Placer County, October 16, 1861. At Camp Sigel, near Auburn, until January, 1862. Moved to Camp Union, Sacramento, then moved to San Francisco April 28, and to Camp Latham, Southern California. At Camp Drum until March, 1863. Moved to Fort Yuma March 1, 1863; to La Paz, Arizona. April 28, 1863; to Fort Yuma August 15, and to Drum Barracks November 7, 1864. Reformed like the other companies, Company F moved to Fort Humboldt May 1, 1865. Duty in Humboldt Military District until mustered out.
- Company G - This company was organized at Camp Sigel, near Auburn, October 26, 1861. At Camp Sigel, until January, 1862. Moved to Camp Union, Sacramento, then moved to San Francisco April 28, 1862, and to Camp Latham, District of Southern California. On October 7, 1862, Captain Grant arrested Colonel E. J. C. Kewen on charges of treason. They then headed to San Diego, California, and duty there until mustered out.
- Company H - This company was mustered into service, February 6, 1862, at Camp Union. Moved to San Francisco April 28, and to Camp Latham, Southern California. On August 29 private John Daker drowned in a creek near Camp Latham while trying to bath. They stayed at Camp Latham and Camp Drum until March, 1863. Ordered to Fort Yuma March 1, and duty there until January, 1864. Moved to Drum Barracks January, 1864, then to San Luis Obispo July 27, 1864. Returned to Drum Barracks and duty there until mustered out. On May 20, 1863, men from Company H were involved in the La Paz incident, resulting in two men from Company H killed and one wounded.
- Company I - This company was raised in Nevada City, and was mustered into service at Camp Sigel, on the seventh day of October, 1861. At Camp Sige until January, 1862. Moved to Camp Union, Sacramento, then to San Francisco April 28, and duty at Benicia Barracks until November, 1862. To Fort Umpqua November 12. Duty there and at Benicia Barracks until March, 1863. Moved to Camp Drum under Captain Charles Atchisson March 6 and to Fort Mojave April 29, and duty there until mustered out.
- Company K - This company was organized at Camp Union, February 1, 1862. Moved to San Francisco April 28, 1862, and duty at Benicia Barracks until March, 1863. Moved to Camp Drum March 6, then to Fort Yuma. Then duty until April, 1864; at Drum Barracks until April, 1865; at Camp Lincoln until July, 1865; at San Bernardino until August, 1865; and at Drum Barracks until it was ordered to the Presidio of San Francisco for final muster out on November 30, 1865.

== See also ==
- List of California Civil War Union units
