= Cullings Well =

Stagecoach station La Paz County, Arizona

Coordinates: 33°54′58″N 113°24′21″W

Cullings Well (also called Culling's Well and Cullens Well) was a stagecoach station on the La Paz–Wickenburg Road. It was named for its proprietor, Englishman Charles C. Culling, who dug the well and established and managed the stagecoach station with his wife Maria Valenzuela Culling for twelve years before he died in 1878. The station became known as Cullens Wells in memory of its founder. After Charles' death, the station was managed by Maria and a station hand by the name of Christian Berry. Maria later married Joseph Drew who together with Christian Berry managed the Cullings Well for a period of time. A post office by that name was maintained there from 1896 to 1902. Cullings Well was 79 miles from La Paz, and 47.5 miles from Wickenburg.

The site of Cullings Well today is at the site of the Miller Reservoir. It is fenced in and is partially filled.
