= Operation Gatekeeper =

1994 American border enforcement measure

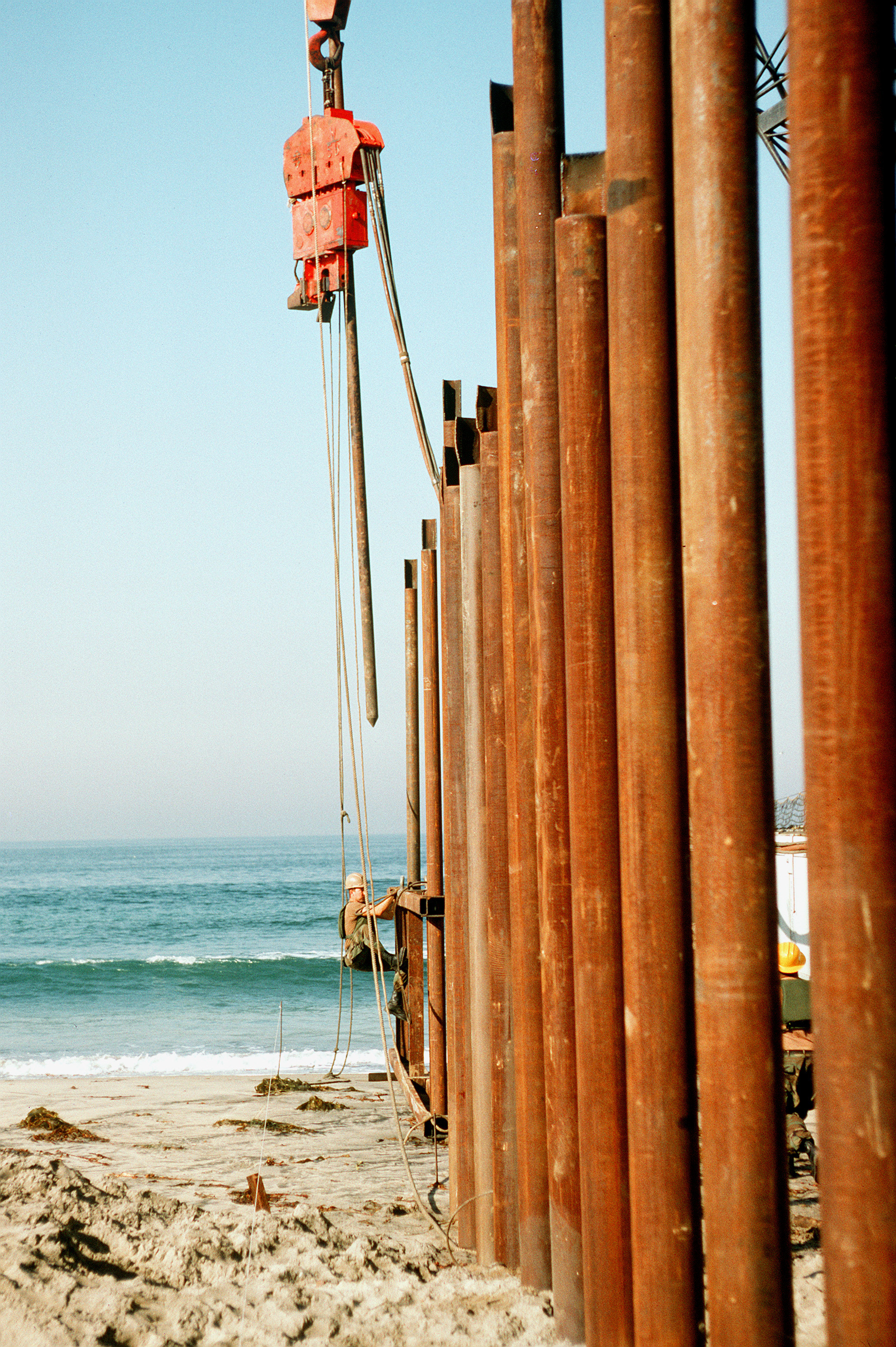
Beach wall construction in the 1990s

Operation Gatekeeper was a measure implemented during the presidency of Bill Clinton by the United States Border Patrol, then a part of the Immigration and Naturalization Service (INS), aimed at halting illegal immigration to the United States at the United States–Mexico border near San Diego, California. According to the INS, the goal of Gatekeeper was "to restore integrity and safety to the nation's busiest border."

Operation Gatekeeper was announced in Los Angeles on September 17, 1994, by U.S. attorney general Janet Reno, and was launched two weeks later on October 1. According to an investigation by the Office of the Inspector General, the number of immigrant apprehensions at Imperial Beach in San Diego for the first week of October in 1994, compared to the first week of October in 1993, was 1,470 more. This shows the effect that the increased number of agents and border security personnel had on the immigration issues that were present in San Diego.

The United States Congress allocated additional funds to the Border Patrol and other agencies. By 1997, the budget of the Immigration and Naturalization Service had doubled to 800 million dollars, the number of Border Patrol agents had nearly doubled, the amount of fencing or other barriers more than doubled, and the number of underground sensors nearly tripled.

The merits of Operation Gatekeeper were debated extensively, including during congressional hearings. The Department of Justice, the INS, and the Border Patrol maintained that Operation Gatekeeper was a success. Some members of Congress and others sharply criticized the program and declared it a failure.

The resulting statistics of Operation Gatekeeper gave the impression that its measures successfully prevented immigrants from traveling into the country through the San Diego area sector by showing lower apprehension numbers. However, these immigrant movements were really funneled to eastern borders towards Tucson and El Paso. In a Los Angeles Times article, editor Kristina Davis claims that Border Patrol data indicates a 591% increase in border apprehensions for the Tucson sector from 1992 to 2004.

== Phases ==
The first phase of Gatekeeper focused on the 5 5/8 westernmost miles of the border, extending from the Pacific Ocean to the San Ysidro Port of Entry near San Diego. U.S. migration routes immediately shifted eastward, and the use of professional human smugglers known as coyotes or polleros increased. In May 1995, the Border Patrol initiated Operation Disruption to target human smugglers, and also established new checkpoints on interior highways.

Phase two, although not formally part of Gatekeeper, was launched in October 1995. It consisted of the appointment of Alan Bersin as the Attorney General's Special Representative on Southwest Border Issues and the establishment of the first immigration court at the actual boundary, inside the San Ysidro Port of Entry. The court expedited hearings and subsequent deportations of undocumented immigrants apprehended attempting to enter the U.S. with false documents or through false representation.

Phase two also introduced IDENT, an automated biometric identification system, to facilitate identification of repeat offenders and "criminal aliens", i.e., illegal immigrants with criminal records or active warrants for their arrest. The Border Patrol also intensified relations with local law enforcement agencies to counter the flow of migrants through the Otay Mountains.

== Allegations of NAFTA enforcement ==
Academic Noam Chomsky has said that Operation Gatekeeper was a "militarization of the U.S.-Mexican border" and alleges it was because North American Free Trade Agreement would have increased illegal immigration into the United States; therefore, Gatekeeper was a precaution to stop future illegal immigration.

== See also ==
- Greaser Act
- Operation Wetback
- Esequiel Hernández Jr.
