= Bradshaw City, Arizona =

Ghost town in Yavapai County, Arizona

- Ghost town
- "The Bradshaw gold and silver mining company of Arizona" 1866 prospectus
- Interactive map of Bradshaw City, Arizona
- Coordinates: 34°11′48″N 112°21′21″W
- Country: United States
- State: Arizona
- County: Yavapai
- Founded: c. 1860
- Abandoned: c. 1880
- Named after: William D. Bradshaw
- Elevation: 6,358 ft (1,938 m)
- Time zone: UTC-7 (MST (no DST))
- Post Office Opened: July 1, 1874
- Post Office Closed: December 15, 1884

Bradshaw City is a ghost town in Yavapai County, Arizona, United States. It served as a mining camp from its founding in 1863 until the late 1880s. "Bradshaw City" is the namesake of William D. Bradshaw.

== History ==
William D. Bradshaw founded Bradshaw City as a mining camp in 1863 after prospectors working on the northwest slope of Mount Wasson discovered gold. The camp began as a loose collection of tents which were soon replaced with hundreds of buildings including dance halls, restaurants, saloons, and hotels as the population inflated to around 5000 people. The town supported the Tiger Mine, situated a short distance from the "Central #26: Crown King Back-road" which serviced the area at the time.

By the end of 1871, miners and prospectors began to move away from Tiger Mine to find work elsewhere. By the 1880s the Tiger mine had played out and Bradshaw city faded. Today, a few foundations and a forest service sign mark the spot where Bradshaw City once stood. A portion of the city cemetery remains.

== See also ==
- Crown King, Arizona
