= Wetback Tank =

- Location within New Mexico
- Location: Sierra County, New Mexico
- Coordinates: 32.9339644°N 107.0111305°W
- Type: reservoir

Wetback Tank is a reservoir in Sierra County, New Mexico, in the United States.

The name of the reservoir has been criticized in the media for containing the ethnic slur wetback.
