= Camp Santa Catalina Island =

Coordinates: 33°26′21.2″N 118°29′58.2″W

Camp Santa Catalina Island (1864), located on Santa Catalina Island, California, at the isthmus, located near the west end of the island. In 1863, following the incident of the Confederate privateer, J. M. Chapman, a military reservation and harbor defenses were proposed here to keep it from being used by a hostile power.

In December 1863 a camp was authorized on the Island, and the garrison commander was authorized to remove all persons on the island, unless permitted to stay by his order. On December 21, 1863, General Wright proposed the island be made into an Indian reservation for the tribes the Volunteers were fighting in northwestern California, in the Humboldt Military District.

Company C, 4th California Infantry under Captain West, occupied Santa Catalina Island January 1, 1864, and established the camp January 2, and no new settlers were permitted on the island. The company served there until all Federal property was removed in December 1864. The camp was abandoned after peace was made with the Indians in the northwest in August 1864 and a reservation was established there. Also the need for a port fortification receded, the danger of privateers preying on West Coast commerce or foreign intervention having faded.
