= James F. Curtis =

James Freeman Curtis II
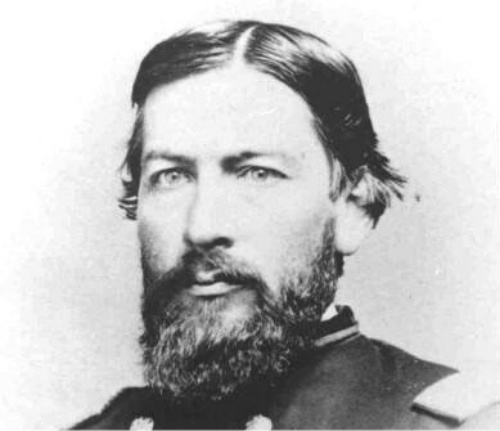

Chief of Police of San Francisco
- In office November 4, 1856 – 1858
- Preceded by: John W. McKenzie
- Succeeded by: Martin J. Burke

Personal details
- Born: December 19, 1825 Boston, Massachusetts, US
- Died: March 1, 1914 (aged 88) Boston, Massachusetts, US

James Freeman Curtis II (December 19, 1825 – March 1, 1914), participant in the 1849 California Gold Rush, Chief of Police of San Francisco, officer in the California state militia and volunteer in the American Civil War.

== Biography ==
James Freeman Curtis was born December 19, 1825, in Boston, Massachusetts. His father died in a train accident in 1839. Not much is known about his father, except he was a midshipman on the USS Constitution in the War of 1812.

Curtis went to sea and in 1849 sailed around Cape Horn, and settled in San Francisco. In the 1850s, he was a leading member of the San Francisco Committee of Vigilance and was a member of the Society of California Pioneers.

He was also an active member of the California Militia and in 1854, was elected First Lieutenant of the California Guard, Light Battery, the oldest military company in the state organized in 1849. Curtis was the Chief of Police of San Francisco with his election to the office November 4, 1856, which he held until 1858.

During the Civil War, Curtis, joined the 4th Infantry Regiment California Volunteers as Major on September 2, 1861. His first assignment was as commander of Fort Colville, Washington Territory. In 1862 he became commander of Fort Lincoln, near Crescent City, California. On June 25, 1863, he was promoted lieutenant colonel and commander of Camp Drum, in Wilmington, California and of the Military District of Southern California. He took command of 4th Infantry Regiment California Volunteers, August 20, 1863 until it was disbanded by consolidation, November 30, 1865. On April 11, 1864, he was promoted Colonel of the 4th Infantry Regiment, and continued as commander of Camp Drum, and the Military District. He remained in Southern California for the duration of the war and was discharged November 30, 1865. In 1867 he was retroactively promoted to Brevet Brigadier General as of May 13, 1865, for meritorious conduct during the war.

After the Civil War he moved to Idaho where he became the secretary of state in 1892. He was also a member of the Grand Army of the Republic.

Curtis died March 1, 1914, in Boston, Massachusetts.
