= Foreign Miners' Tax Act of 1850 =

California state law

The Foreign Miners' Tax Act of 1850 (official name An Act for the better regulation of the Mines and the government of foreign Miners, nickname the miserable law of 20 piastres) was an Act passed by the United States state of California in 1850, imposing a tax of $20/month on foreign miners. The Act was repealed in 1851, and subsequently replaced by the Foreign Miners' License Tax Act of 1852, that charged $3/month. Both were in response to public dislike of Chinese miners.

== Background ==
In 1848, the Mexican–American War concluded and Alta California (that includes the modern US state of California, plus nearby regions) became part of the United States. At around the same time, gold was discovered in California, leading to an influx of miners into California, both from within the United States, and from other regions, primarily China and Latin America (including Mexico, Peru, and Guatemala). This was the beginning of the California gold rush.

The competition from foreign miners would lead to resentment among the white miners, leading to calls to limit foreign competition in mining.

On December 20, 1849, Peter Hardeman Burnett became the first Governor of the state of California. Burnett was a proponent of the state's exclusionary policies towards foreign miners, and in particular Chinese ones (he would later support the Chinese Exclusion Act, and also pushed for blacks to leave the state of California or face public flogging).

== The Act ==
=== Passage ===
The Act was signed into law by Governor Peter Hardeman Burnett on Saturday, April 13, 1850. The text of the Act was advertised in California newspapers over the next two weeks.

=== Statement ===
The Act stated that all miners in the state of California who were not citizens of the United States, and who had not become citizens by the Treaty of Guadalupe Hidalgo had to pay a monthly fee of $20, equivalent to several hundred dollars in current United States dollars (sources include estimates of $400 and $500). Of this, the tax collector would keep $3 and the rest would be remitted to the state. The goal of the Act was to raise $200,000 in revenue for the state. A special exemption covered California's Native Americans.

== Response ==
=== Modification to exclude free whites and people eligible for citizenship ===
The Act met with protests from Irish, English, Canadian, and German miners, and was rewritten to exempt any miner who was a "free white person" or any miner who could become an American citizen (the "free white person" designation was borrowed from the Naturalization Act of 1790).

=== Sonora protest ===
On Sunday, May 19, 1850, a group of about 4,000 mostly Mexican and Peruvian miners, led by two exiled French miners, protested against the tax in the plaza in Sonora, Tuolumne County. They were chased by a volunteer militia comprising about 500 tax collectors and Anglo miners. The protest broke up after some of the Anglos raised their rifles and fired on the rebels.

=== Revenue shortfall and effect on Mexican and Chinese miners ===
The Act had a number of effects:

- It raised much less revenue than expected, primarily because a number of Mexican and Chinese miners quit mining in response to the Act.
- The racial tensions caused many Mexicans and other immigrants to revolt against the California mining communities for the unequal taxation
- While both Mexican and Chinese miners quit in large numbers, and many mining camps depopulated, the effect on their presence in the country was different: many Mexicans returned home, whereas Chinese mostly moved to the cities in an impoverished state, further increasing resentment felt by whites toward the Chinese.
- Landowners and merchants in Tuolumne County were concerned about the drop in rents and prices and the decrease in demand in their region due to the exodus of miners. They lobbied for the repeal of the tax.

=== Repeal ===
On January 9, 1851, John McDougall (sometimes spelled John McDougal) succeeded Peter Burnett as California governor. Unlike his predecessor and successor, McDougall had a favorable view of Chinese immigration, and saw it as a way to cope with California's labor shortage, proposing to employ Chinese immigrants in projects to reclaim swamps and flooded lands. Under McDougall's governorship, the Act was repealed in 1851.

Prior to the act's repeal, due to the petitions in the Southern Mines from the merchants and the Mexican, Chilean, and French miners, the act was reduced. The reduction of the foreign miners tax was announced by the Stockton Times on August 10, 1850, where it was reduced to twenty dollars per four months instead of the previous twenty dollars per month. After this reduction, it was then repealed the following year in 1851.

=== Subsequent legislation ===
A new Foreign Miners' License Tax was introduced in 1852 under Governor John Bigler, who, like Burnett (but unlike McDougal) was not friendly to Chinese immigration. The new tax was $3/month, unlike the original $20/month, and it would rise gradually over the next few years.

== See also ==
- People v. Hall
- Greaser Act
- Act for the Government and Protection of Indians
- List of historical acts of tax resistance
- History of coal miners
- History of Chinese Americans
- California gold rush
