= Greaser (derogatory) =

Derogatory term for a Mexican in what is now the U.S. Southwest in the 19th century

Greaser was a derogatory term for a Mexican in what is now the U.S. Southwest in the 19th century. The slur likely derived from what was considered one of the lowliest occupations typically held by Mexicans, the greasing of the axles of wagons; they also greased animal hides that were taken to California where Mexicans loaded them onto clipper ships (a greaser). It was in common usage among U.S. troops during the Mexican–American War.

The term was actually incorporated into an early California statute, the Greaser Act (1855), an expression of a virulent form of anti-Mexican sentiment among many Anglo Californians.

Greaser persisted in use through the silent movie era, as evidenced by movies such as Ah Sing and the Greasers (1910), The Greaser's Gauntlet (1908),Tony, the Greaser (1911), The Greaser and the Weakling (1912), The Girl and the Greaser (1913), The Greaser's Revenge (1914), and Bronco Billy and the Greaser (1914). Subsequently, however, Hollywood began to cut its usage of this particular derogatory term to improve its distribution in Mexican and Latin American markets.

The eugenicist Madison Grant made mention of the term with respect to Mexicans of mixed ancestry in his 1916 work of scientific racism The Passing of the Great Race.

== Other uses ==
- The term is not generally considered derogatory when referring to greaser culture, as prominently featured in S.E. Hinton's The Outsiders.
- In British English, the term was used in the 1960s–70s to describe the Rocker subculture.
- "Greaser" can also be used as a shortened form of greaseball, an insult against Italian people, Greek people, and Southern Europeans generally, in reference to the greased styles often sported in their hair, supposed lack of hygiene, or supposed naturally greasy hair.
