= La Paz incident =

American Civil War incident in La Paz, Arizona

- Part of the American Civil War
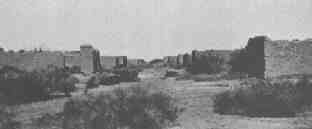
- La Paz, c. 1890, already a ghost town
| Date | May 20, 1863 |
| Location | La Paz, Arizona |
| Result | Two Union soldiers killed Confederate partisan dead on the run |

Belligerents
| United States | Confederate States |

Commanders and leaders
| (United States) James A. Hale | (Confederate States of America) William Edwards |

Casualties and losses
| 2 killed | 1 dead from exposure |
- One civilian was wounded by gunfire.; William 'Frog' Edwards died in the desert after the shooting while trying to escape the Union Army.

The La Paz incident occurred on May 20, 1863, at the mining town of La Paz, Arizona. William "Frog" Edwards, only recently released from detention at Fort Yuma, ambushed a party of Union soldiers when they stopped at La Paz to purchase supplies. Edwards' attack killed one soldier and wounded two more. Edwards then fled into the desert where he died of exposure and dehydration.

== Incident ==
After the Confederates established their own Arizona Territory at Mesilla, New Mexico, in February 1862, the Union sent the California Column east to reinforce the Union Army engaged in the New Mexico Campaign. Confederate cavalry briefly occupied Tucson from February 28 until early May 1862, but withdrew soon after the skirmish at Picacho Peak. The following year General James H. Carleton arrested several California secessionists bound for Texas and detained them at Fort Yuma; William "Frog" Edwards was one of these detainees. La Paz was one of a handful of mining settlements that had been established along the Colorado River. It was situated along an important army supply route that had been in use since the Yuma War. On the evening of May 20, 1863, the Colorado River steamer Cocopah arrived at La Paz en route to Fort Mohave. A small party of soldiers from the 4th California Infantry who were escorting the cargo disembarked to purchase supplies at Cohn's Store.

Lurking in the shadows was William "Frog" Edwards, only recently released from jail at Fort Yuma. As the soldiers approached the store, Edwards opened fire with his revolver. Private Ferdinand Behn was killed instantly, Private Truston Wentworth was mortally wounded and died the following day, Private Thomas Gainor was severely wounded, but recovered. One bystander was also struck and suffered a serious wound. Lieutenant James Hale immediately searched the town with his remaining men but did not find Edwards. Lieutenant Hale returned to Fort Yuma aboard the Cocopah with his dead and wounded the following day. In response to Edwards' attack, a detachment of forty men from Fort Mojave commanded by Captain Charles Atchisson was deployed to hunt him down. Edwards was found several days later in the desert, where he apparently died of exposure and dehydration.

== See also ==
- St. Albans Raid
- Stanwix Station
