= Wetback (slur) =

Derogatory term mostly referring to Mexican illegal immigrants to the United States

Wetback is a derogatory term used in the United States to refer to foreign nationals residing in the U.S., most commonly Mexicans. The word targets illegal immigrants in the United States. Generally used as an ethnic slur, the term was originally coined and applied only to Mexicans who entered the U.S. state of Texas from Mexico by crossing the Rio Grande, which is the U.S. border, presumably by swimming or wading across the river and getting wet, i.e. getting their back wet, in the process.

== Usage ==
The first use of the term wetback in The New York Times is dated June 20, 1920. It was used officially by the US government, including Dwight D. Eisenhower in 1954, with "Operation Wetback", a project that involved the mass deportation of illegal Mexican immigrants. Usage of the term appeared in mainstream media outlets until the 1960s.

The term can be used as an adjective or verb. As an adjective, it pertains to activities involving Mexican illegal aliens in the United States. The earliest known recorded use in this way is by John Steinbeck in the novel Sweet Thursday, the sequel to Cannery Row, with the sentence "How did he get in the wet-back business?" It was originally used as a verb in 1978 in Thomas Sanchez's Hollywoodland, with the meaning "to gain illegal entry into the United States by swimming the Rio Grande".

The equivalent Spanish-language term used in Mexico, Central America, and by Latinos in the United States is espalda mojada, and is often shortened to mojado. It is not normally considered derisive in those contexts. For example, Guatemalan Latin Pop singer Ricardo Arjona's 2006 song "Mojado" uses the word inoffensively, as he describes a migrant seeking a better life in another country, suggesting a reclaiming of the word.

== See also ==
- Anti-Mexican sentiment
- Hispanophobia
- Xenophobia
- Mexico–United States border
- Illegal immigration to the United States
- Goobacks – a South Park parody of the concept
