= Mineral City, Arizona =

- Ghost town
- Location within Arizona Location within the United States
- Coordinates: 33°36′43″N 114°31′05″W
- Country: United States
- State: Arizona
- County: La Paz
- Founded: 1863
- Became part of Ehrenburg, Arizona: 1869

Population
  - Total: 0
- Time zone: UTC-7 (MST (no DST))

Mineral City was a steamboat landing and ferry crossing on the Colorado River in La Paz County, Arizona, United States from 1863 to 1866. It was located on the east bank of the Colorado River, one mile below its rival Olive City and 1/2 mile below the original site of Ehrenberg and 1 1/2 miles above its current site.

== History ==
In the fall of 1863, Mineral City developed as another landing for steamboats on the Colorado River, located one mile downstream from Olive City, which was the landing for the La Paz mines. This point was where the recently created freight wagon road known as the Bradshaw Trail across the desert from San Bernardino crossed the river at Bradshaw's Ferry.

In 1866, a new landing was established between Olive City and Mineral City, with the support of two captains of the steamboat company of George A. Johnson & Company. Mineral City became the name of this larger settlement, resulting in the abandonment of Olive City and by 1870 La Paz also.

Mineral City received its post office in 1869, but the name of the post office, along with that of the town, was changed to Ehrenberg.

== See also ==
- Steamboat transport on the Colorado River
