= Ehrenberg, Arizona =

CDP and ghost town in La Paz County, Arizona

- Census-designated place
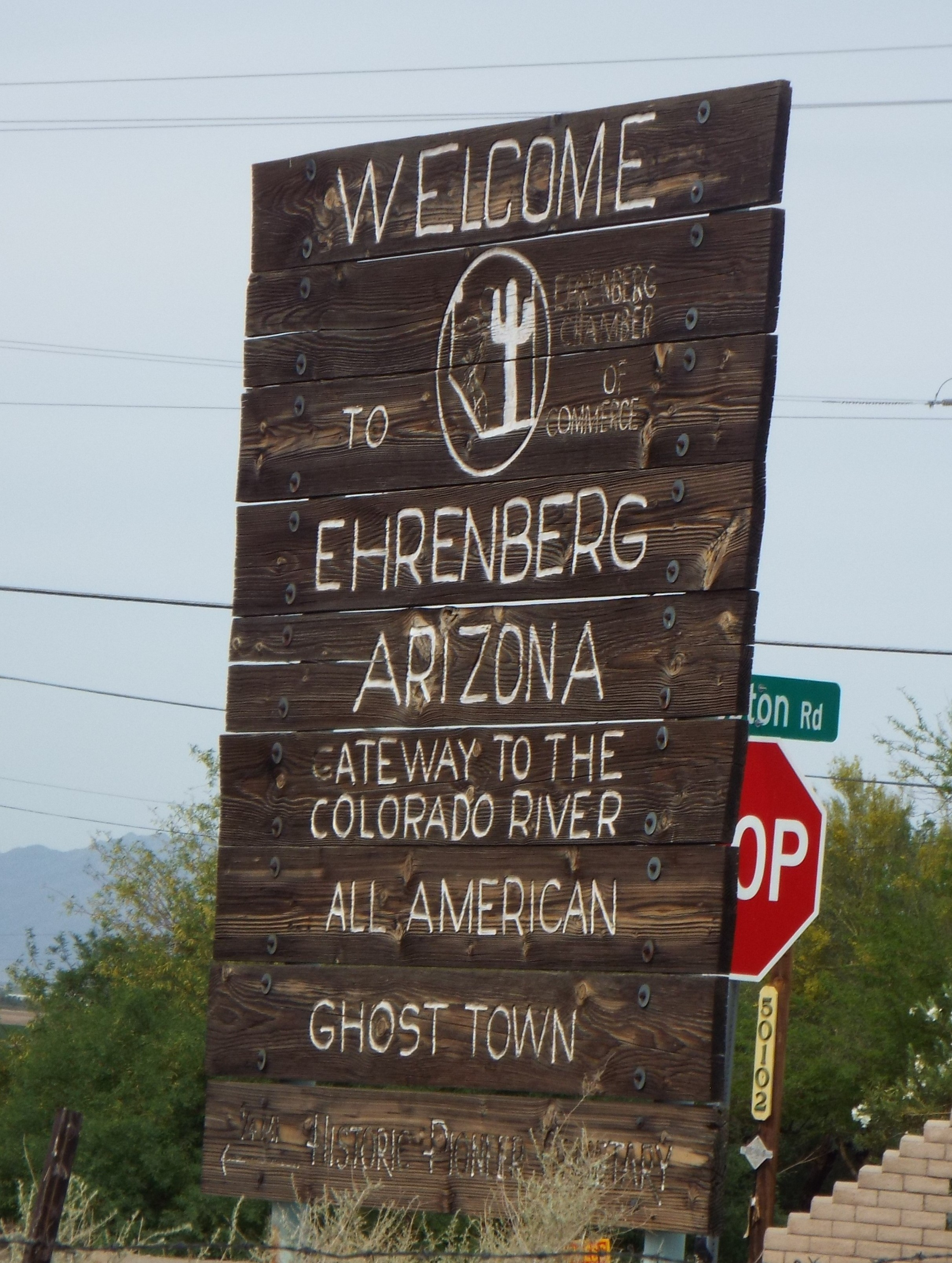
- Welcome to Ehrenberg, Arizona (Ghost Town)

- Location in La Paz County and the state of Arizona
- Coordinates: 33°37′03″N 114°29′18″W
- Country: United States
- State: Arizona
- County: La Paz

Area
  - Total: 12.14 sq mi (31.43 km^{2})
  - Land: 11.92 sq mi (30.88 km^{2})
  - Water: 0.21 sq mi (0.54 km^{2})
- Elevation: 377 ft (115 m)

Population (2020)
  - Total: 763
  - Density: 64.0/sq mi (24.71/km^{2})
- Time zone: UTC-7 (MST (no DST))
- ZIP code: 85334
- Area code: 928
- FIPS code: 04-21800
- GNIS feature ID: 2408050

Ehrenberg, also historically spelled "Ehrenburg", is an unincorporated community and census-designated place (CDP) in La Paz County, Arizona, United States. The population was 763 at the 2020 census, down from 1,470 at the 2010 census. Ehrenberg is named for its founder, Herman Ehrenberg.

Ehrenberg is located on the Colorado River, which forms the border with Riverside County, California, near the city of Blythe. It is situated close to Interstate 10, at the southern end of the Parker Valley and next to the Palo Verde Valley.

== History ==
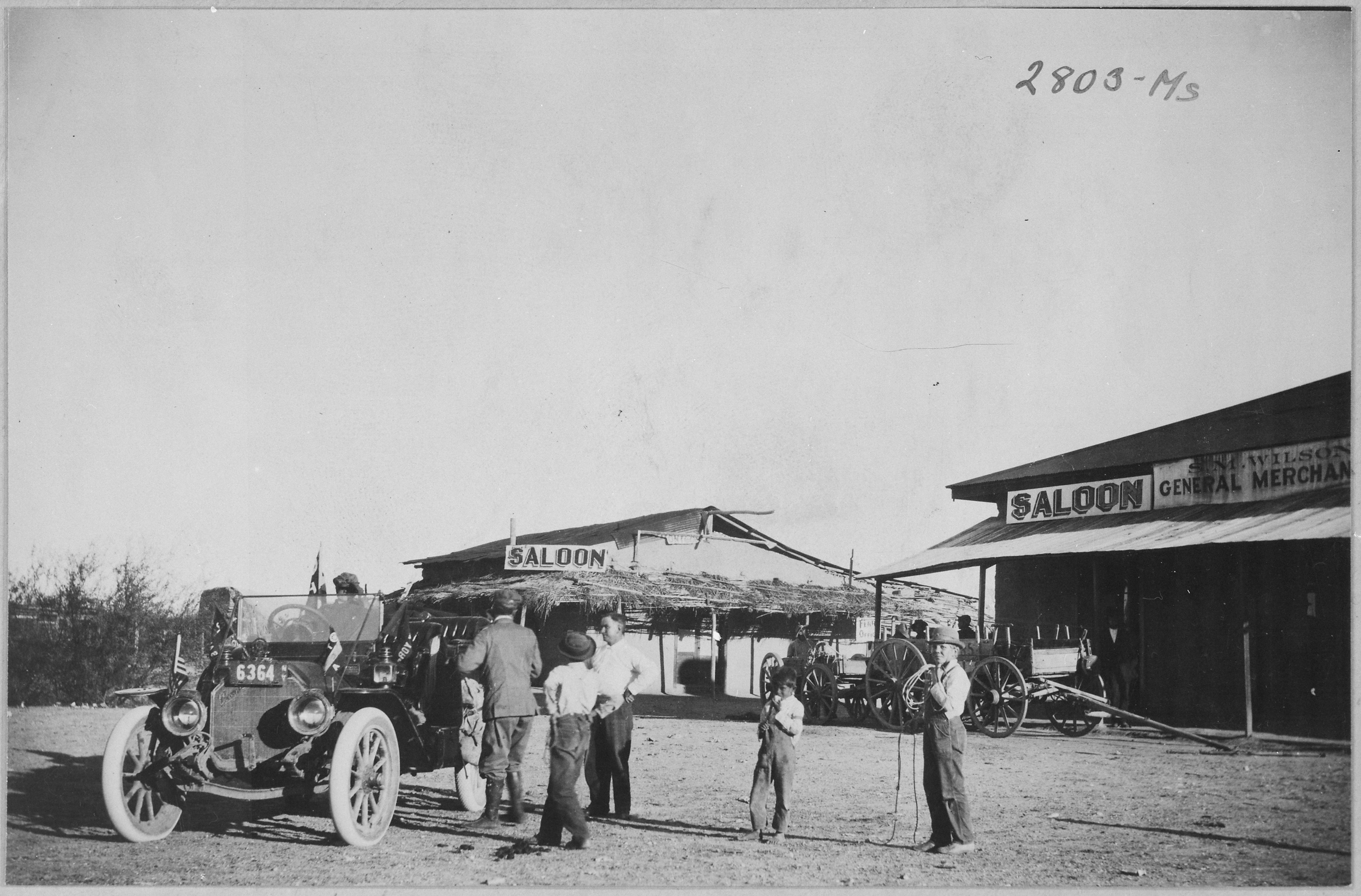
Ehrenberg in 1911

In 1863, German mining engineer Herman Ehrenberg was hired to survey a new townsite along the Colorado River, approximately 6 miles (10 km) from La Paz, Arizona. The town, named Mineral City, began to grow in 1866, after a new landing was established there, supported by the steamboat captains of the George A. Johnson Company. Mineral City attracted miners and many businessmen away from La Paz and by September 20, 1869, had grown large enough to win a post office. The same year it was renamed "Ehrenberg".

Over the next several years the town continued to grow, surpassing La Paz. By 1875 there were 500 residents. The population of La Paz dwindled, and many storekeepers relocated to Ehrenberg.

Around the start of the 20th century, railroads began to bypass the river as the major means of transporting goods. The town's population declined, and it lost its post office on December 31, 1913.

Many of the surviving older buildings in town were torn down in the 1950s to make way for a trailer park.

== Geography ==
Ehrenberg is located in western La Paz County and is located on the Colorado River, which forms the border between Arizona and California. The community is along Interstate 10, which leads east 145 miles (233 km) to Phoenix and west 100 miles (160 km) to Indio, California.

According to the United States Census Bureau, the Ehrenberg CDP has a total area of 12.1 square miles (31.4 km^{2}), of which 11.9 square miles (30.9 km^{2}) are land and, or 1.78%, are water.

=== Climate ===
This area has a large amount of sunshine year-round due to its stable descending air and high pressure. According to the Köppen Climate Classification system, Ehrenberg has a desert climate, abbreviated "BWh" on climate maps.

Climate data for Ehrenburg, Arizona, 1991–2020 normals, extremes 1977–2018
| Month | Jan | Feb | Mar | Apr | May | Jun | Jul | Aug | Sep | Oct | Nov | Dec | Year |
|---|---|---|---|---|---|---|---|---|---|---|---|---|---|
| Record high °F (°C) | 87 (31) | 92 (33) | 98 (37) | 107 (42) | 115 (46) | 123 (51) | 123 (51) | 119 (48) | 116 (47) | 110 (43) | 96 (36) | 84 (29) | 123 (51) |
| Mean maximum °F (°C) | 77.1 (25.1) | 83.1 (28.4) | 91.0 (32.8) | 99.9 (37.7) | 106.8 (41.6) | 113.1 (45.1) | 115.7 (46.5) | 114.3 (45.7) | 110.7 (43.7) | 100.6 (38.1) | 87.5 (30.8) | 75.5 (24.2) | 116.5 (46.9) |
| Mean daily maximum °F (°C) | 67.8 (19.9) | 72.3 (22.4) | 78.8 (26.0) | 86.2 (30.1) | 94.7 (34.8) | 104.5 (40.3) | 107.9 (42.2) | 107.4 (41.9) | 101.7 (38.7) | 89.8 (32.1) | 76.7 (24.8) | 65.8 (18.8) | 87.8 (31.0) |
| Daily mean °F (°C) | 55.3 (12.9) | 58.7 (14.8) | 64.7 (18.2) | 71.2 (21.8) | 79.9 (26.6) | 89.1 (31.7) | 94.3 (34.6) | 94.1 (34.5) | 87.9 (31.1) | 75.6 (24.2) | 62.8 (17.1) | 53.2 (11.8) | 73.9 (23.3) |
| Mean daily minimum °F (°C) | 42.7 (5.9) | 45.2 (7.3) | 50.6 (10.3) | 56.2 (13.4) | 65.2 (18.4) | 73.7 (23.2) | 80.6 (27.0) | 80.8 (27.1) | 74.1 (23.4) | 61.4 (16.3) | 48.8 (9.3) | 40.6 (4.8) | 60.0 (15.5) |
| Mean minimum °F (°C) | 34.9 (1.6) | 37.0 (2.8) | 41.6 (5.3) | 48.4 (9.1) | 55.0 (12.8) | 63.6 (17.6) | 74.0 (23.3) | 72.4 (22.4) | 64.3 (17.9) | 51.6 (10.9) | 39.1 (3.9) | 32.3 (0.2) | 31.1 (−0.5) |
| Record low °F (°C) | 28 (−2) | 26 (−3) | 35 (2) | 37 (3) | 40 (4) | 51 (11) | 62 (17) | 63 (17) | 57 (14) | 42 (6) | 31 (−1) | 25 (−4) | 25 (−4) |
| Average precipitation inches (mm) | 0.70 (18) | 0.65 (17) | 0.47 (12) | 0.11 (2.8) | 0.06 (1.5) | 0.00 (0.00) | 0.23 (5.8) | 0.33 (8.4) | 0.47 (12) | 0.30 (7.6) | 0.18 (4.6) | 0.55 (14) | 4.05 (103.7) |
| Average precipitation days (≥ 0.01 in) | 2.4 | 2.4 | 2.0 | 0.6 | 0.3 | 0.0 | 0.9 | 1.1 | 1.9 | 1.1 | 0.8 | 1.7 | 15.2 |
Source 1: NOAA
Source 2: XMACIS2 (mean maxima/minima 1981–2010)

== Demographics ==
Historical population
| Census | Pop. | Note | %± |
|---|---|---|---|
| 2000 | 1,357 | | — |
| 2010 | 1,470 | | 8.3% |
| 2020 | 763 | | −48.1% |
U.S. Decennial Census

As of the census of 2000, there were 1,357 people, 545 households, and 348 families residing in the CDP. The population density was 113.7 inhabitants per square mile (43.9/km^{2}). There were 824 housing units at an average density of 69.1 per square mile (26.7/km^{2}). The racial makeup of the CDP was 82.8% White, 1.1% Black or African American, 1.6% Native American, 0.1% Asian, 0.1% Pacific Islander, 10.5% from other races, and 3.8% from two or more races. Hispanic or Latino of any race were 30.1% of the population.

There were 545 households, out of which 31.9% had children under the age of 18 living with them, 45.7% were married couples living together, 8.8% had a female householder with no husband present, and 36.1% were non-families. 27.7% of all households were made up of individuals, and 9.5% had someone living alone who was 65 years of age or older. The average household size was 2.5 and the average family size was 3.1.

In the CDP, the population was spread out, with 28.0% under the age of 18, 8.0% from 18 to 24, 27.3% from 25 to 44, 23.9% from 45 to 64, and 12.7% who were 65 years of age or older. The median age was 37 years. For every 100 females, there were 110.7 males. For every 100 females age 18 and over, there were 110.6 males.

The median income for a household in the CDP was $27,000, and the median income for a family was $28,000. Males had a median income of $35,956 versus $18,100 for females. The per capita income for the CDP was $14,372. About 17.0% of families and 22.7% of the population were below the poverty line, including 25.7% of those under age 18 and 17.9% of those age 65 or over.

== Infrastructure ==
The Ehrenberg Improvement District provides drinking water to the community.

== Sources ==
- Hinckley, Jim; James, Kerrick (2010), Ghost Towns of the Southwest: Your Guide to the Historic Mining Camps and Ghost Towns of Arizona and New Mexico, Voyageur Press, ISBN 978-0760332214
