= La Paz, Arizona =

- Ghost town
- Location within Arizona Location within the United States
- Coordinates: 33°40′45″N 114°28′35″W
- Country: United States
- State: Arizona
- County: La Paz
- Founded: 1862, before Arizona was officially declared a territory by President Abraham Lincoln
- Abandoned: 1875
- Elevation: 299 ft (91 m)

Population (2009)
  - Total: 0
- Time zone: UTC-7 (MST (no DST))
- Post Office opened: January 17, 1865
- Post Office closed: March 25, 1875

La Paz (Yavapai: Wi:hela) was a short-lived early gold mining town along the Colorado River on the western border of current-day La Paz County, Arizona. The town grew quickly after gold was discovered nearby in 1862. La Paz, Spanish for peace, was chosen as the name in recognition of the feast day for Our Lady of Peace. Originally located in the New Mexico Territory, the town became part of the Arizona Territory when President Abraham Lincoln established the new territory in 1863. In 1983 the newly formed County of La Paz adopted the name, long after the town had become a ghost town.

La Paz was the location of the La Paz Incident in 1863, the westernmost confrontation of the American Civil War.

== History ==
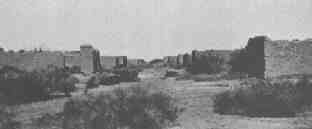
La Paz, c. 1890, already a ghost town.

Mountain man Pauline Weaver discovered gold in the Arroyo De La Teneja, on the eastern bank of the Colorado River, on January 12, 1862. His discovery triggered the Colorado River gold rush. La Paz grew in the spring of 1862 along the Colorado River to serve the miners washing placer gold in the La Paz Mining District. This district produced about 50,000 troy ounces of gold per year in 1863 and 1864. La Paz had a population of 1,500 and was a stage stop between Fort Whipple, Arizona, and San Bernardino, California. The town was the county seat of Yuma County from 1864 to 1870, and as the largest town in the territory in 1863 was considered for the Arizona territorial capital.

The placers were largely exhausted by 1863, but the community hung on as a shipping port for steamboats of the Colorado River and supply base until the Colorado River shifted its course westward in 1866, leaving La Paz landlocked. The shipping business was taken over by a new river town, Ehrenberg, six miles south. In 1870 the population of La Paz had declined to 254. In 1871 the county seat was moved to Arizona City, later renamed Yuma in 1873. The county records were shipped to Yuma by Captain Polyphemus in the Nina Tilden. La Paz was deserted by 1875 and as peaceful as its name.

Nothing remains of La Paz except a couple of crumbling stone foundations and a historical marker.

== Geography ==
La Paz is located at 33°40′45″N 114°28′35″W, at an elevation of 300 feet (91 m) above sea level.

== See also ==
- Steamboat transport on the Colorado River
