= Timeline of the Salton Sea =

Bibliography of the Salton Sea

Salton Sea
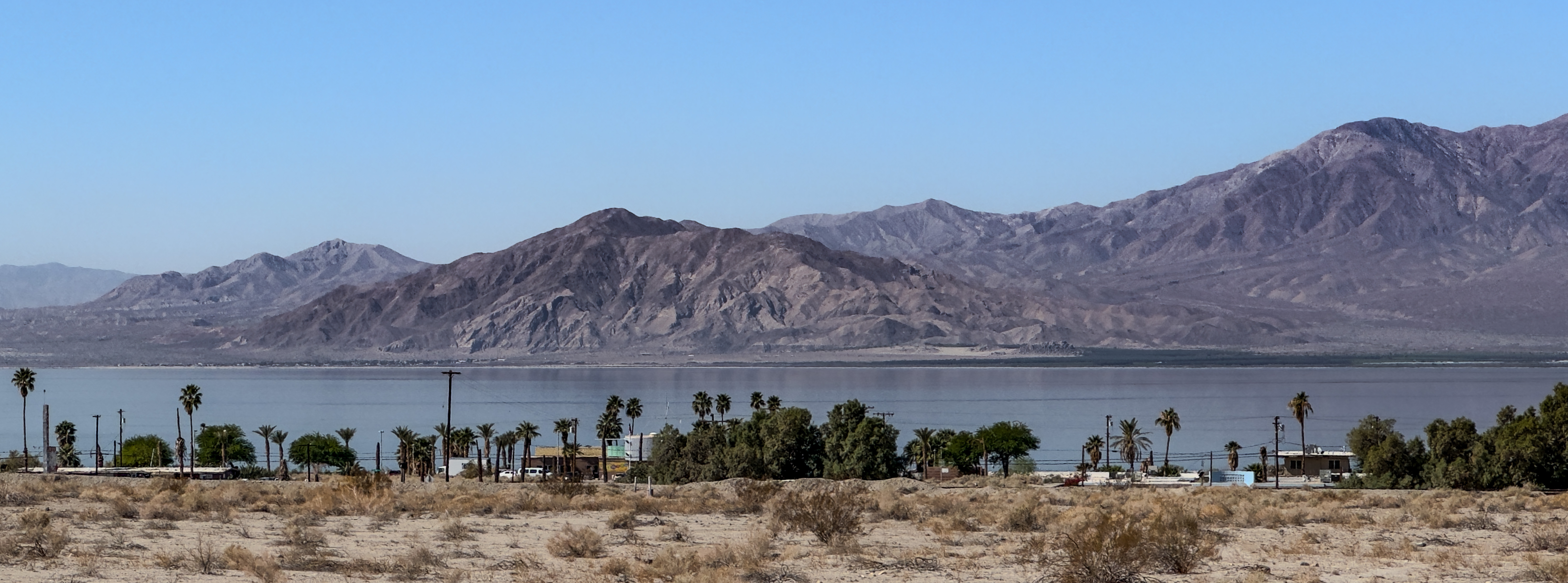
- The Salton Sea, with the Santa Rosa Mountains in the background
- Location: Salton Sink, Colorado Desert; Imperial and Riverside counties, California, U.S.
- Coordinates: 33°19′59″N 115°50′03″W
- Type: Endorheic rift lake
- Primary inflows: Alamo River; New River; Whitewater River
- Primary outflows: None
- Catchment area: 8,360 sq mi (21,700 km^{2})
- Max. length: 35 mi (56 km)
- Max. width: 15 mi (24 km)
- Surface area: 305 sq mi (790 km^{2}) (March 2025)
- Max. depth: 33 ft (10 m) (2024)
- Water volume: 6,000,000 acre⋅ft (7.4 km^{3})
- Salinity: 65–70 ppt (2024)
- Surface elevation: −241.8 ft (−73.7 m) (NAVD 88, August 2026)
- Settlements: Bombay Beach, Desert Beach, Desert Shores, North Shore, Salton City, Salton Sea Beach
- References: U.S. Geological Survey Geographic Names Information System: Timeline of the Salton Sea

This is a timeline of the Salton Sea, a shallow saline lake in the Salton Trough of Southern California. The basin has filled and dried many times. The present lake dates from 1905, when the Colorado River broke through an irrigation intake and ran into the Salton Sink for about two years. Agricultural drainage has sustained it ever since. The lake reached its highest level in the mid-1990s and has been shrinking and growing saltier since.

The sea supports large numbers of migratory birds on the Pacific Flyway and has seen repeated mass die-offs of birds and fish. It drew resort development and heavy tourism in the 1950s and 1960s, then declined through flooding, rising salinity and pollution. A 2003 water transfer, the Quantification Settlement Agreement, cut its inflow further; the exposed lakebed is now a source of windblown dust and a public-health concern, and the geothermal field on its southern shore has become a focus of lithium extraction.

== Statistics ==
- Surface area – shrinking: 380 square miles (980 km^{2}) in 1993 and 1996, and approximately 350 square miles (910 km^{2}) in 2015. By 2021 it had shrunk to 324 square miles (840 km^{2}), and it covered a little over 300 square miles (780 km^{2}) in 2025.
- Dimensions – Approximately 45 miles (72 km) long when it formed. 35 miles (56 km) long and 15 miles (24 km) wide in 1993 and 1994, then 35 miles (56 km) long and 17 miles (27 km) wide in 1996 and 1997.
- Salinity – Around 44,000 mg/L in 1997 and again in 2003, compared with roughly 35,000 mg/L for sea water.

=== Prehistory and Lake Cahuilla ===
- Geologic past – Silt from the Colorado River builds a delta across the northern area of the Gulf of California, raising an area about 43 feet (13 m) above sea level. This seals off the northern Salton Trough, which has a bottom below sea level. The river gradually shifts course over time and when it turns north into the trough again the basin becomes a freshwater lake. When it runs south to the Gulf, the lake dries up.
- Late Pleistocene–Holocene – The Salton Sink fills in and dries up repeatedly as the Colorado River changes course, forming a succession of lakes, the largest of them Lake Cahuilla.
- Late Holocene – The five rhyolite domes around the Salton Buttes erupt in three episodes: Mullet Island first, then Obsidian Butte, then Rock Hill. The Global Volcanism Program gives the episodes as 290 BCE, 10 CE and 210 CE, each ± 100 years. Mullet Island is the least well dated and may be several thousand years older.
- Late Holocene – Obsidian from the Obsidian Butte area near the southeastern shore of the Salton Sea becomes a regional toolstone, and is widely traded across northern Mexico and the Southwestern United States.

== See also ==
- Outline of the Salton Sea
- Bibliography of the Salton Sea
- Coachella Valley
- Colorado Desert
- Imperial County, California
- List of lakes of California
- Mojave Desert
- Riverside County, California
