= Bibliography of the Salton Sea =

Salton Sea
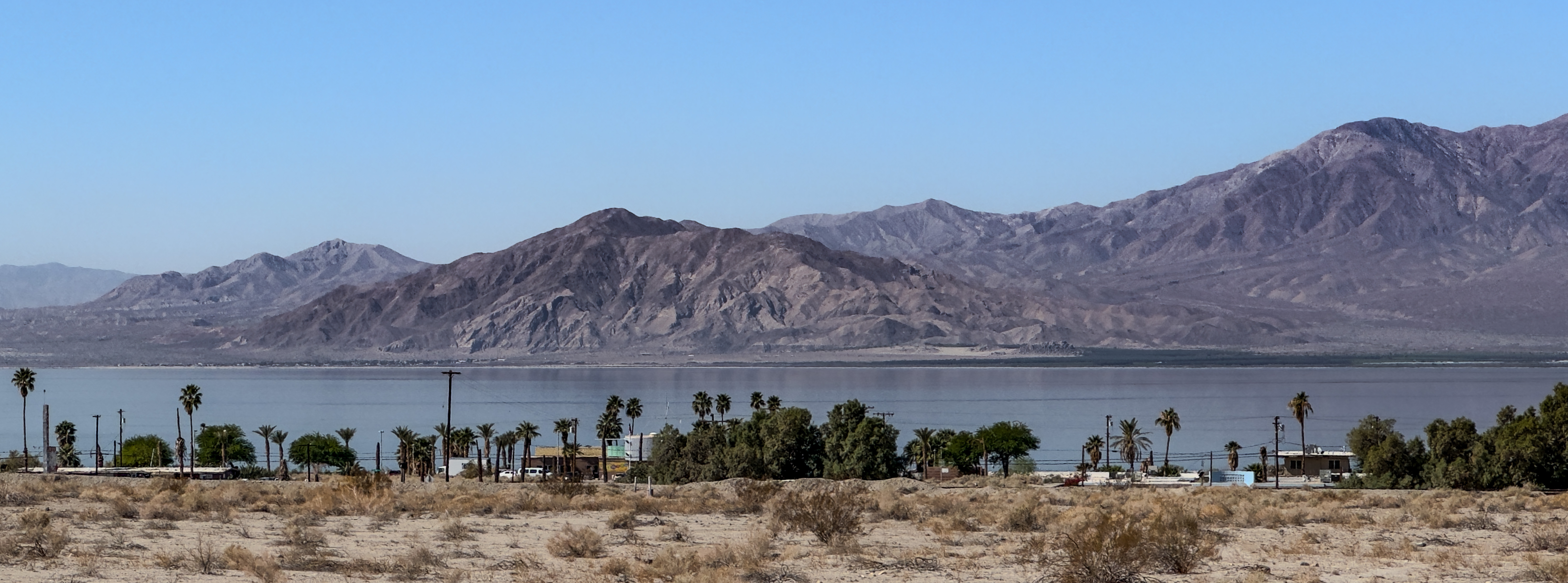
- The Salton Sea, with the Santa Rosa Mountains in the background
- Location: Salton Sink, Colorado Desert; Imperial and Riverside counties, California, U.S.
- Coordinates: 33°19′59″N 115°50′03″W
- Type: Endorheic rift lake
- Primary inflows: Alamo River; New River; Whitewater River
- Primary outflows: None
- Catchment area: 8,360 sq mi (21,700 km^{2})
- Max. length: 35 mi (56 km)
- Max. width: 15 mi (24 km)
- Surface area: 305 sq mi (790 km^{2}) (March 2025)
- Max. depth: 33 ft (10 m) (2024)
- Water volume: 6,000,000 acre⋅ft (7.4 km^{3})
- Salinity: 65–70 ppt (2024)
- Surface elevation: −241.8 ft (−73.7 m) (NAVD 88, August 2026)
- Settlements: Bombay Beach, Desert Beach, Desert Shores, North Shore, Salton City, Salton Sea Beach
- References: U.S. Geological Survey Geographic Names Information System: Bibliography of the Salton Sea

This is a bibliography of the Salton Sea. It lists scholarly and journalistic works on the sea's geology, ecology, water policy, history, and surrounding communities.

The Salton Sea is a shallow, landlocked, highly saline endorheic lake in Riverside and Imperial counties in Southern California. It lies on the San Andreas Fault within the Salton Trough, which stretches to the Gulf of California in Mexico. The lake is about 15 by 35 miles (24 by 56 km) at its widest and longest. The sea has a surface area at 318 square miles (820 km^{2}). The Salton Sea became a resort destination in the 20th century, but saw die-offs of fish and birds in the 1980s due to contamination from farm runoff, and clouds of toxic dust in the 21st century as evaporation exposed parts of the lake bed.

Works listed here are cited in the notes or bibliographies of scholarly sources. Each is published by an academic or major press, written by a recognized expert, or substantially reviewed in scholarly journals; borderline cases are omitted. A selection of primary sources are included. Many of the books below carry their own bibliographies; see the Further reading section for other bibliographies, and the External links section for historical sites, academic sites, and museums.

Citations follow APA style. (Note: Entries are in plain text APA 7 format without templates; templates are used only for reviews and notes.) Book have citations to academic journal or mainstream published reviews when available. For books only partly about the subject, relevant chapter or section titles are provided when useful and available. Translators of the original-language edition are included when possible. In cases where a title or name has appeared with more than one English spelling, the most recent published form is used and a footnote documents any earlier title under which the work appeared.

== Science and ecology ==
=== Geology and earth science ===
- Adams, P. M., Lynch, D. K., Buckland, K. N., Johnson, P. D., & Tratt, D. M. (2017). Sulfate mineralogy of fumaroles in the Salton Sea geothermal field, Imperial County, California. Journal of Volcanology and Geothermal Research, 347, 15–43.
- Babcock, E. A. (1974). Geology of the northeast margin of the Salton Trough, Salton Sea, California. Geological Society of America Bulletin, 85(3), 321–332.
- Brothers, D. S., Driscoll, N. W., Kent, G. M., Baskin, R. L., Harding, A. J., & Kell, A. M. (2022). Seismostratigraphic analysis of Lake Cahuilla sedimentation cycles and fault displacement history beneath the Salton Sea, California, USA. Geosphere, 18(4), 1354–1376.
- Buckles, J. E., Kashiwase, K., & Krantz, T. (2002). Reconstruction of prehistoric Lake Cahuilla in the Salton Sea Basin using GIS and GPS. Hydrobiologia, 473(1–3), 55–57.
- Elders, W. A., & Sass, J. H. (1988). The Salton Sea Scientific Drilling Project. Journal of Geophysical Research: Solid Earth, 93(B11), 12953–12968.
- Lohman, R. B., & McGuire, J. J. (2007). Earthquake swarms driven by aseismic creep in the Salton Trough, California. Journal of Geophysical Research: Solid Earth, 112(B4), B04405.
- MacDougal, D. T. (1914). The Salton Sea: A study of the geography, the geology, the floristics, and the ecology of a desert basin. Carnegie Institution of Washington.
- McKibben, M. A., & Elders, W. A. (1985). Fe-Zn-Cu-Pb mineralization in the Salton Sea geothermal system, Imperial Valley, California. Economic Geology, 80(3), 539–559.
- Muffler, L. J. P., & White, D. E. (1969). Active metamorphism of upper Cenozoic sediments in the Salton Sea geothermal field and the Salton Trough, southeastern California. Geological Society of America Bulletin, 80(2), 157–182.
- Philibosian, B., Fumal, T., & Weldon, R. (2011). San Andreas fault earthquake chronology and Lake Cahuilla history at Coachella, California. Bulletin of the Seismological Society of America, 101(1), 13–38.
- Phukan, A., Braje, T. J., Rockwell, T. K., & Ullah, I. (2019). Shorelines in the desert: Mapping fish trap features along the southwest coast of ancient Lake Cahuilla, California. Advances in Archaeological Practice, 7(4), 325–336.
- Robinson, P. T., Elders, W. A., & Muffler, L. J. P. (1976). Quaternary volcanism in the Salton Sea geothermal field, Imperial Valley, California. Geological Society of America Bulletin, 87(3), 347–360.
- Rockwell, T. K., Meltzner, A. J., Haaker, E. C., & Madugo, D. (2022). The late Holocene history of Lake Cahuilla: Two thousand years of repeated fillings within the Salton Trough, Imperial Valley, California. Quaternary Science Reviews, 282, 107456.
- Skinner, B. J., White, D. E., Rose, H. J., & Mays, R. E. (1967). Sulfides associated with the Salton Sea geothermal brine. Economic Geology, 62(3), 316–330.
- Taira, T., Nayak, A., Brenguier, F., & Manga, M. (2018). Monitoring reservoir response to earthquakes and fluid extraction, Salton Sea geothermal field, California. Science Advances, 4(1), e1701536.
- Waters, M. R. (1983). Late Holocene lacustrine chronology and archaeology of ancient Lake Cahuilla, California. Quaternary Research, 19(3), 373–387.

=== Water and aquatic ecology ===
- Byron, E. R., & Ohlendorf, H. M. (2007). Diffusive flux of selenium between lake sediment and overlying water: Assessing restoration alternatives for the Salton Sea. Lake and Reservoir Management, 23(5), 630–636.
- Bradley, T. J., & Yanega, G. M. (2018). Salton Sea: Ecosystem in transition. Science, 359(6377), 754.
- Bullock, J., & Gude, V. G. (2023). Economics of brine desalination for communities near the Salton Sea geothermal field, California, USA. Environmental Earth Sciences, 82(1), 3.
- Busse, M. M., McKibben, M. A., Stringfellow, W., Dobson, P., & Stokes-Draut, J. R. (2024). Impact of geothermal expansion and lithium extraction in the Salton Sea known geothermal resource area (SS-KGRA) on local water resources. Environmental Research Letters, 19(10), 104011.
- Byron, E. R., & Ohlendorf, H. M. (2007). Diffusive flux of selenium between lake sediment and overlying water: Assessing restoration alternatives for the Salton Sea. Lake and Reservoir Management, 23(5), 630–636.
- Cantor, A., & Knuth, S. (2018). Speculations on the postnatural: Restoration, accumulation, and sacrifice at the Salton Sea. Environment and Planning A: Economy and Space, 51(2), 527–544.
- Carpelan, L. H. (1958). The Salton Sea: Physical and chemical characteristics. Limnology and Oceanography, 3(4), 373–386.
- Cohn, J. P. (2000). Saving the Salton Sea. BioScience, 50(4), 295.
- de Koff, J. P., Anderson, M. A., & Amrhein, C. (2008). Geochemistry of iron in the Salton Sea, California. Hydrobiologia, 604(1), 111–121.
- Evermann, B. W. (1916). Fishes of the Salton Sea. Copeia, (34), 61. JSTOR 1436917
- Freund, H., Maltz, M. R., Swenson, M. P., Topacio, T. M., Montellano, V. A., Porter, W., & Aronson, E. L. (2022). Microbiome interactions and their ecological implications at the Salton Sea. California Agriculture, 76(1), 16–26.
- Hawley, E. R., Schackwitz, W., & Hess, M. (2014). Metagenomic sequencing of two Salton Sea microbiomes. Genome Announcements, 2(1), e01208-13.
- Jones, B. A., Wang, J., & Fleck, J. (2026). Sending agricultural water to the Salton Sea to improve public health? An integrated agri-hydro-health economic analysis. Journal of the Association of Environmental and Resource Economists, 13(2), 389–424.
- Kjelland, M. E., & Swannack, T. M. (2018). Salton Sea days of future past: Modeling impacts of alternative water transfer scenarios on fish and bird population dynamics. Ecological Informatics, 43, 124–145.
- Lange, C. B., & Tiffany, M. A. (2002). The diatom flora of the Salton Sea, California. Hydrobiologia, 473(1–3), 179–201.
- Levers, L. R., Skaggs, T. H., & Schwabe, K. A. (2019). Buying water for the environment: A hydro-economic analysis of Salton Sea inflows. Agricultural Water Management, 213, 554–567.
- Levers, L., Story, S. D., & Schwabe, K. (2020). Boons or boondoggles: An assessment of the Salton Sea water importation options. California Agriculture, 74(2), 73–79.
- Moreau, M. F., Surico-Bennett, J., Vicario-Fisher, M., Crane, D., Gerads, R., Gersberg, R. M., & Hurlbert, S. H. (2007). Contaminants in tilapia (Oreochromis mossambicus) from the Salton Sea, California, in relation to human health, piscivorous birds and fish meal production. Hydrobiologia, 576(1), 127–165.
- Mulvaney, D., Blair, J. J. A., & Cantor, A. (2025). Sunrise at the Salton Sea: Environmental justice, land use change, and hydrosocial dynamics of solar energy transitions in the Imperial Valley, California. Sustainability Science, 20(4), 1433–1452.
- Riedel, R., & Costa-Pierce, B. A. (2005). Feeding ecology of Salton Sea tilapia (Oreochromis spp.). Bulletin, Southern California Academy of Sciences, 104(1), 26–36.
- Rightnar, J., & Dinar, A. (2020). The welfare implications of bankruptcy allocation of the Colorado River water: The case of the Salton Sea region. Water Resources Management, 34(8), 2353–2370.
- Rogerson, A., & Hauer, G. (2002). Naked amoebae (Protozoa) of the Salton Sea, California. Hydrobiologia, 473(1–3), 161–177.
- Saiki, M. K. (1990). Elemental concentrations in fishes from the Salton Sea, southeastern California. Water, Air, and Soil Pollution, 52(1–2), 41–56.
- Tiffany, M. A., Barlow, S. B., Matey, V. E., & Hurlbert, S. H. (2001). Chattonella marina (Raphidophyceae), a potentially toxic alga in the Salton Sea, California. Hydrobiologia, 466(1–3), 187–194.
- Tiffany, M. A., González, M. R., Swan, B. K., Reifel, K. M., Watts, J. M., & Hurlbert, S. H. (2007). Phytoplankton dynamics in the Salton Sea, California, 1997–1999. Lake and Reservoir Management, 23(5), 582–605.
- Tiffany, M. A., Swan, B. K., Watts, J. M., & Hurlbert, S. H. (2002). Metazooplankton dynamics in the Salton Sea, California, 1997–1999. Hydrobiologia, 473(1–3), 103–120.
- Vogl, R. A., & Henry, R. N. (2002). Characteristics and contaminants of the Salton Sea sediments. Hydrobiologia, 473(1–3), 47–54.
- Warwick, R. M., Dexter, D. M., & Kuperman, B. (2002). Freeliving nematodes from the Salton Sea. Hydrobiologia, 473(1–3), 121–128.

=== Wildlife ecology ===
- Anderson, T. W., Tiffany, M. A., & Hurlbert, S. H. (2007). Stratification, sulfide, worms, and decline of the eared grebe (Podiceps nigricollis) at the Salton Sea, California. Lake and Reservoir Management, 23(5), 500–517.
- Friend, M. (2002). Avian disease at the Salton Sea. Hydrobiologia, 473(1–3), 293–306.
- Grinnell, J. (1908). Birds of a voyage on Salton Sea. The Condor, 10(5), 185–191. JSTOR 1361437
- Jehl, J. R., & McKernan, R. L. (2002). Biology and migration of eared grebes at the Salton Sea. Hydrobiologia, 473(1–3), 245–253.
- Kjelland, M. E., & Swannack, T. M. (2018). Salton Sea days of future past: Modeling impacts of alternative water transfer scenarios on fish and bird population dynamics. Ecological Informatics, 43, 124–145.
- Orr, D., Bonis-Ericksen, K., Bautista, C., & Jones, A. (2026). A shrinking inland sea: Trends in avian populations and habitats at the Salton Sea. Waterbirds, 48(3), 1–18.
- Patten, M. A., McCaskie, G., & Unitt, P. (2003). Birds of the Salton Sea: Status, biogeography, and ecology. University of California Press.
- Van Rossem, A. (1911). Winter birds of the Salton Sea region. The Condor, 13(4), 129–137. JSTOR 1361802

=== Air quality and public health ===
- Biddle, T. A., Li, Q., Maltz, M. R., Tandel, P. N., Chakraborty, R., Yisrael, K., Drover, R., Cocker, D. R., & Lo, D. D. (2021). Salton Sea aerosol exposure in mice induces a pulmonary response distinct from allergic inflammation. Science of the Total Environment, 792, 148450.
- Buck, B. J., King, J., & Etyemezian, V. (2011). Effects of salt mineralogy on dust emissions, Salton Sea, California. Soil Science Society of America Journal, 75(5), 1971–1985.
- Cheney, A. M., Ortiz, G., Trinidad, A., Rodriguez, S., Moran, A., Gonzalez, A., Chavez, J., & Pozar, M. (2023). Latinx and Indigenous Mexican caregivers' perspectives of the Salton Sea environment on children's asthma, respiratory health, and co-presenting health conditions. International Journal of Environmental Research and Public Health, 20(11), 6023.
- Dickey, H., Schreuder, M., Schmid, B., & Yimam, Y. T. (2023). Quantifying dust emission potential of playa and desert surfaces in the Salton Sea Air Basin, California, United States. Aeolian Research, 60, 100850.
- Juturu, P. (2021). Assessing emergency healthcare accessibility in the Salton Sea region of Imperial County, California. PLOS ONE, 16(6), e0253301.
- King, J., Etyemezian, V., Sweeney, M., Buck, B. J., & Nikolich, G. (2011). Dust emission variability at the Salton Sea, California, USA. Aeolian Research, 3(1), 67–79.
- Lieb, H. C., & Faloona, I. C. (2025). Deducing atmospheric conditions that contribute to elevated pollution events in the Salton Sea Air Basin. Atmospheric Environment, 352, 121191.
- Miao, Y., Porter, W. C., Benmarhnia, T., Lowe, C., Lyons, T. W., Hung, C., & Diamond, C. (2025). Source-specific acute cardio-respiratory effects of ambient coarse particulate matter exposure in California's Salton Sea region. Environmental Research: Health, 3(1), 015006.
- Moreau, M. F., Surico-Bennett, J., Vicario-Fisher, M., Crane, D., Gerads, R., Gersberg, R. M., & Hurlbert, S. H. (2007). Contaminants in tilapia (Oreochromis mossambicus) from the Salton Sea, California, in relation to human health, piscivorous birds and fish meal production. Hydrobiologia, 576(1), 127–165.
- Parajuli, S. P., & Zender, C. S. (2018). Projected changes in dust emissions and regional air quality due to the shrinking Salton Sea. Aeolian Research, 33, 82–92.

=== Energy and natural resources ===
- Adams, P. M., Lynch, D. K., Buckland, K. N., Johnson, P. D., & Tratt, D. M. (2017). Sulfate mineralogy of fumaroles in the Salton Sea geothermal field, Imperial County, California. Journal of Volcanology and Geothermal Research, 347, 15–43.
- Britton, A., Olmedo, L., Torres, C. A., & Blair, J. J. A. (2024). Hydrosocial imaginaries of green extractivism: Water-energy transitions and geothermal lithium development at the Salton Sea in Imperial Valley, California. The Extractive Industries and Society, 20, 101567.
- Bullock, J., & Gude, V. G. (2023). Economics of brine desalination for communities near the Salton Sea geothermal field, California, USA. Environmental Earth Sciences, 82(1), 3.
- Busse, M. M., McKibben, M. A., Stringfellow, W., Dobson, P., & Stokes-Draut, J. R. (2024). Impact of geothermal expansion and lithium extraction in the Salton Sea known geothermal resource area (SS-KGRA) on local water resources. Environmental Research Letters, 19(10), 104011.
- Elders, W. A., & Sass, J. H. (1988). The Salton Sea Scientific Drilling Project. Journal of Geophysical Research: Solid Earth, 93(B11), 12953–12968.
- McKibben, M. A., & Elders, W. A. (1985). Fe-Zn-Cu-Pb mineralization in the Salton Sea geothermal system, Imperial Valley, California. Economic Geology, 80(3), 539–559.
- Muffler, L. J. P., & White, D. E. (1969). Active metamorphism of upper Cenozoic sediments in the Salton Sea geothermal field and the Salton Trough, southeastern California. Geological Society of America Bulletin, 80(2), 157–182.
- Mulvaney, D., Blair, J. J. A., & Cantor, A. (2025). Sunrise at the Salton Sea: Environmental justice, land use change, and hydrosocial dynamics of solar energy transitions in the Imperial Valley, California. Sustainability Science, 20(4), 1433–1452.
- Robinson, P. T., Elders, W. A., & Muffler, L. J. P. (1976). Quaternary volcanism in the Salton Sea geothermal field, Imperial Valley, California. Geological Society of America Bulletin, 87(3), 347–360.
- Skinner, B. J., White, D. E., Rose, H. J., & Mays, R. E. (1967). Sulfides associated with the Salton Sea geothermal brine. Economic Geology, 62(3), 316–330.
- Taira, T., Nayak, A., Brenguier, F., & Manga, M. (2018). Monitoring reservoir response to earthquakes and fluid extraction, Salton Sea geothermal field, California. Science Advances, 4(1), e1701536.

== History and culture ==
=== Archaeology and ancient Lake Cahuilla ===
- Phukan, A., Braje, T. J., Rockwell, T. K., & Ullah, I. (2019). Shorelines in the desert: Mapping fish trap features along the southwest coast of ancient Lake Cahuilla, California. Advances in Archaeological Practice, 7(4), 325–336.
- Waters, M. R. (1983). Late Holocene lacustrine chronology and archaeology of ancient Lake Cahuilla, California. Quaternary Research, 19(3), 373–387.

=== Early surveys and the making of the sea, 1905–1920 ===
Books below are from the early history of the Salton Sea, written before 1920 and are provided as historical information, not scientific.

- Crane, W. B. (1914). The history of the Salton Sea. Annual Publication of the Historical Society of Southern California, 9(3), 215–224. JSTOR 41168708
- Evermann, B. W. (1916). Fishes of the Salton Sea. Copeia, (34), 61. JSTOR 1436917
- Grinnell, J. (1908). Birds of a voyage on Salton Sea. The Condor, 10(5), 185–191. JSTOR 1361437
- MacDougal, D. T. (1914). The Salton Sea: A study of the geography, the geology, the floristics, and the ecology of a desert basin. Carnegie Institution of Washington.
- MacDougal, D. T. (1915). The Salton Sea. American Journal of Science, s4-39(231), 231–250.
- MacDougal, D. T. (1917). A decade of the Salton Sea. Geographical Review, 3(6), 457–473. JSTOR 207690
- Van Rossem, A. (1911). Winter birds of the Salton Sea region. The Condor, 13(4), 129–137. JSTOR 1361802

=== Regional and environmental history ===
- Andrés, B. J., Jr. (2015). Power and control in the Imperial Valley: Nature, agribusiness, and workers on the California borderland, 1900–1940. Texas A&M University Press
- deBuys, W., & Myers, J. (1999). Salt dreams: Land and water in low-down California. University of New Mexico Press.
- Stringfellow, K. (2011). Greetings from the Salton Sea: Folly and intervention in the Southern California landscape, 1905–2005. Center for American Places at Columbia College Chicago.
- Voyles, T. B. (2016). Environmentalism in the interstices: California's Salton Sea and the borderlands of nature and culture. Resilience: A Journal of the Environmental Humanities, 3, 211–241.
- Voyles, T. B. (2021). The settler sea: California's Salton Sea and the consequences of colonialism. University of Nebraska Press.
- Voyles, T. B. (2021). Toxic masculinity: California's Salton Sea and the environmental consequences of manliness. Environmental History, 26(1), 127–141.

=== Bombay Beach and other Salton Sea communities ===
- Carroll, R. (2018, April 23). In a forgotten town by the Salton Sea, newcomers build a bohemian dream. The Guardian.
- Iovenko, C. (2026, April 11). A 'weird dream' of an arts festival began 10 years ago in the California desert – can it survive its growing popularity?. The Guardian.
- Mazurek, A. (2022, January 14). On the shore of the Salton Sea lies Southern California's hidden arts scene. The Washington Post.
- Miranda, C. A. (2019, March 29). At the Bombay Beach Biennale, an opera greets the sunrise over a toxic Salton Sea. Los Angeles Times.
- Perry, T. (1994, July 6). Lake Woebegone's welcome sign. Los Angeles Times.
- Plevin, R. (2024, December 16). In the dust of the Coachella Valley, residents push for a park along the shrinking Salton Sea. Los Angeles Times.
- Randall, L. (2003, March 23). California's dead sea. The Washington Post.

=== Environmental decline, water, and public health ===
- Boyle, R. H. (1996, June). The life or death of the Salton Sea?. Smithsonian Magazine.
- Frankel, T. C. (2015, May 28). California's largest lake is slipping away amid an epic drought. The Washington Post.
- Goodyear, D. (2015, April 27). The dying sea. The New Yorker.
- Iovenko, C. (2015, November 9). Toxic dust from a dying California lake. The Atlantic.
- James, I. (2025, May 24). California turns on water to create new wetlands on the shore of the shrinking Salton Sea. Los Angeles Times.
- Jones, R. A. (1989, May 23). Salton Sea—victim of salt and apathy. Los Angeles Times.
- Perry, T. (1993, August 16). Lovers of Salton Sea hope to turn back tide of decline. Los Angeles Times.
- Perry, T. (1997, June 8). A wave of new hope for saving a sick sea. Los Angeles Times.
- Sahagun, L. (2003, December 20). Salton Sea's silt could add to its troubles. The Washington Post.
- Singh, M. (2021, July 24). 'The air is toxic': How an idyllic California lake became a nightmare. The Guardian.
- Ulrich, A. (2024, March 17). 'I'll run until there's no sea left': The gas mask-wearing ultramarathoner circling the Salton Sea. The Guardian.

== Economic development ==
- Britton, A., Olmedo, L., Torres, C. A., & Blair, J. J. A. (2024). Hydrosocial imaginaries of green extractivism: Water-energy transitions and geothermal lithium development at the Salton Sea in Imperial Valley, California. The Extractive Industries and Society, 20, 101567.
- Scheyder, E. (2022, June 30). California approves lithium tax despite industry's warnings. Reuters.
- Scheyder, E. (2022, October 5). U.S. steps away from flagship lithium project with Buffett's Berkshire. Reuters.
- Spagat, E. (2021, August 30). Lithium fuels hopes for revival on California's largest lake. Associated Press.

== Reference works and collections ==
- Barnum, D. A., Elder, J. F., Stephens, D., & Friend, M. (Eds.). (2002). The Salton Sea: Proceedings of the Salton Sea Symposium, held in Desert Hot Springs, California, 13–14 January 2000. Springer Netherlands.
- Payne, W. (2006). The Salton Sea: A selective annotated bibliography. Reference Services Review, 34(2), 316–321. Download PDF
- Redlands Institute. (2002). Salton Sea atlas. ESRI Press.

== See also ==
- Outline of the Salton Sea
- Timeline of the Salton Sea
- Coachella Valley
- Colorado Desert
- Imperial County, California
- List of lakes of California
- Mojave Desert
- Riverside County, California
