= Outline of the Salton Sea =

Salton Sea
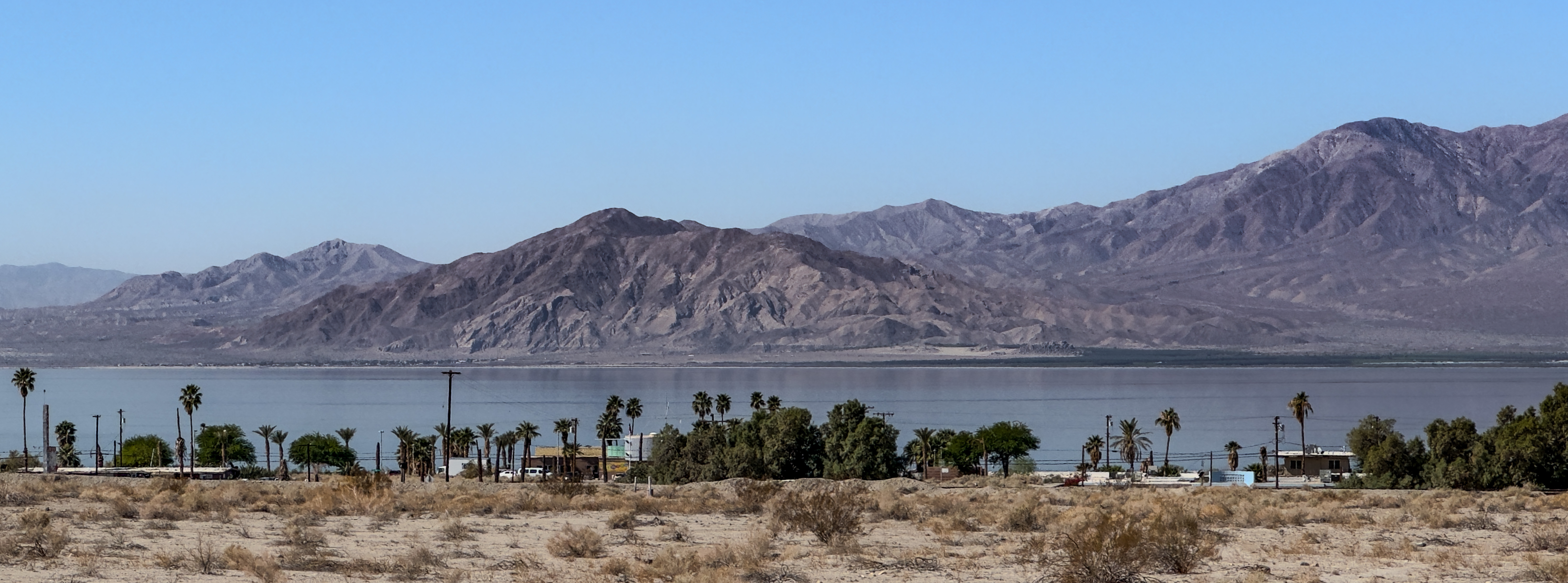
- The Salton Sea, with the Santa Rosa Mountains in the background
- Location: Salton Sink, Colorado Desert; Imperial and Riverside counties, California, U.S.
- Coordinates: 33°19′59″N 115°50′03″W
- Type: Endorheic rift lake
- Primary inflows: Alamo River; New River; Whitewater River
- Primary outflows: None
- Catchment area: 8,360 sq mi (21,700 km^{2})
- Max. length: 35 mi (56 km)
- Max. width: 15 mi (24 km)
- Surface area: 305 sq mi (790 km^{2}) (March 2025)
- Max. depth: 33 ft (10 m) (2024)
- Water volume: 6,000,000 acre⋅ft (7.4 km^{3})
- Salinity: 65–70 ppt (2024)
- Surface elevation: −241.8 ft (−73.7 m) (NAVD 88, August 2026)
- Settlements: Bombay Beach, Desert Beach, Desert Shores, North Shore, Salton City, Salton Sea Beach
- References: U.S. Geological Survey Geographic Names Information System: Outline of the Salton Sea

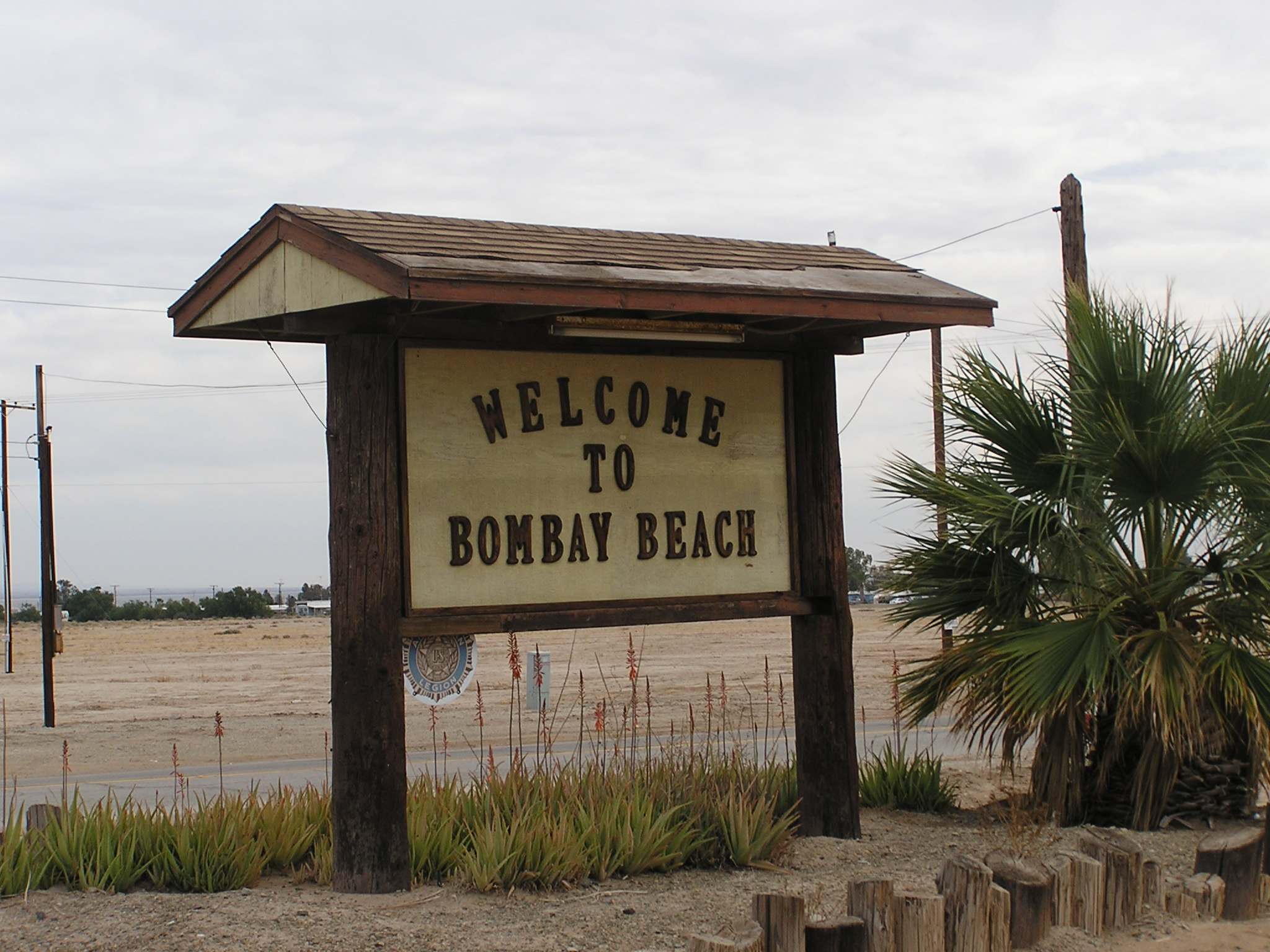
Bombay Beach sign

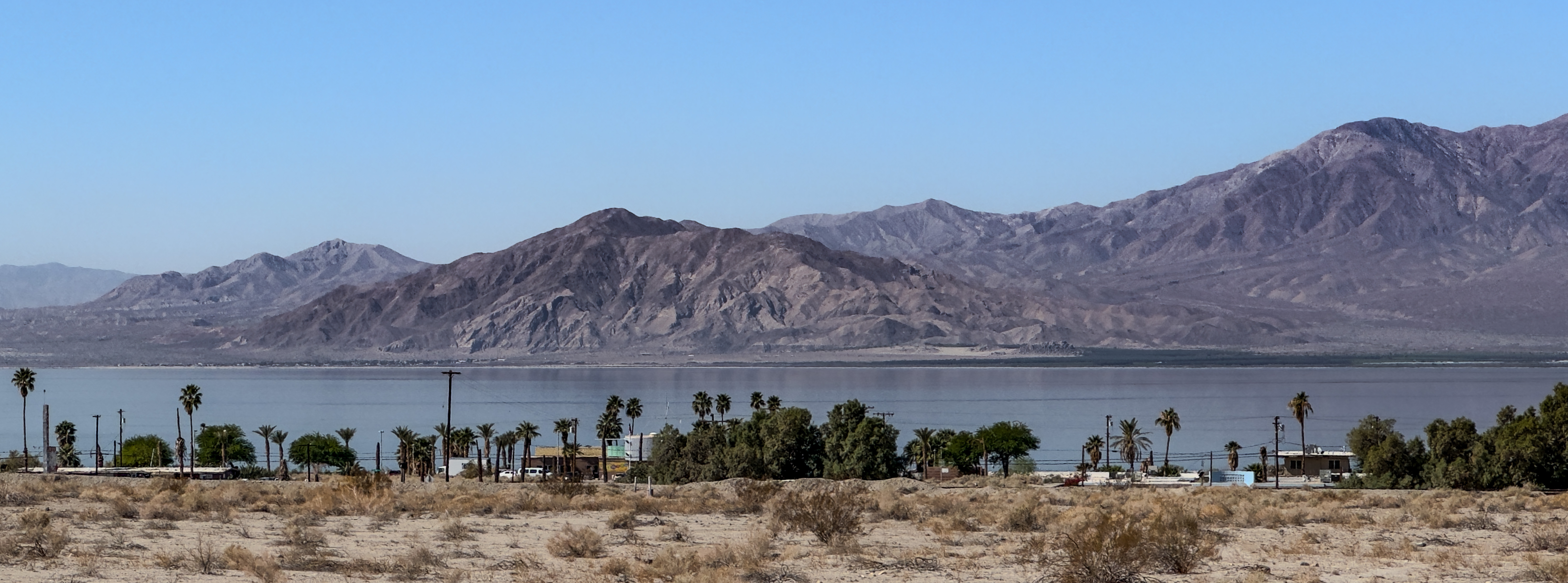
Mortmar, North Shore, California and Salton Sea, Santa Rosa Mountains

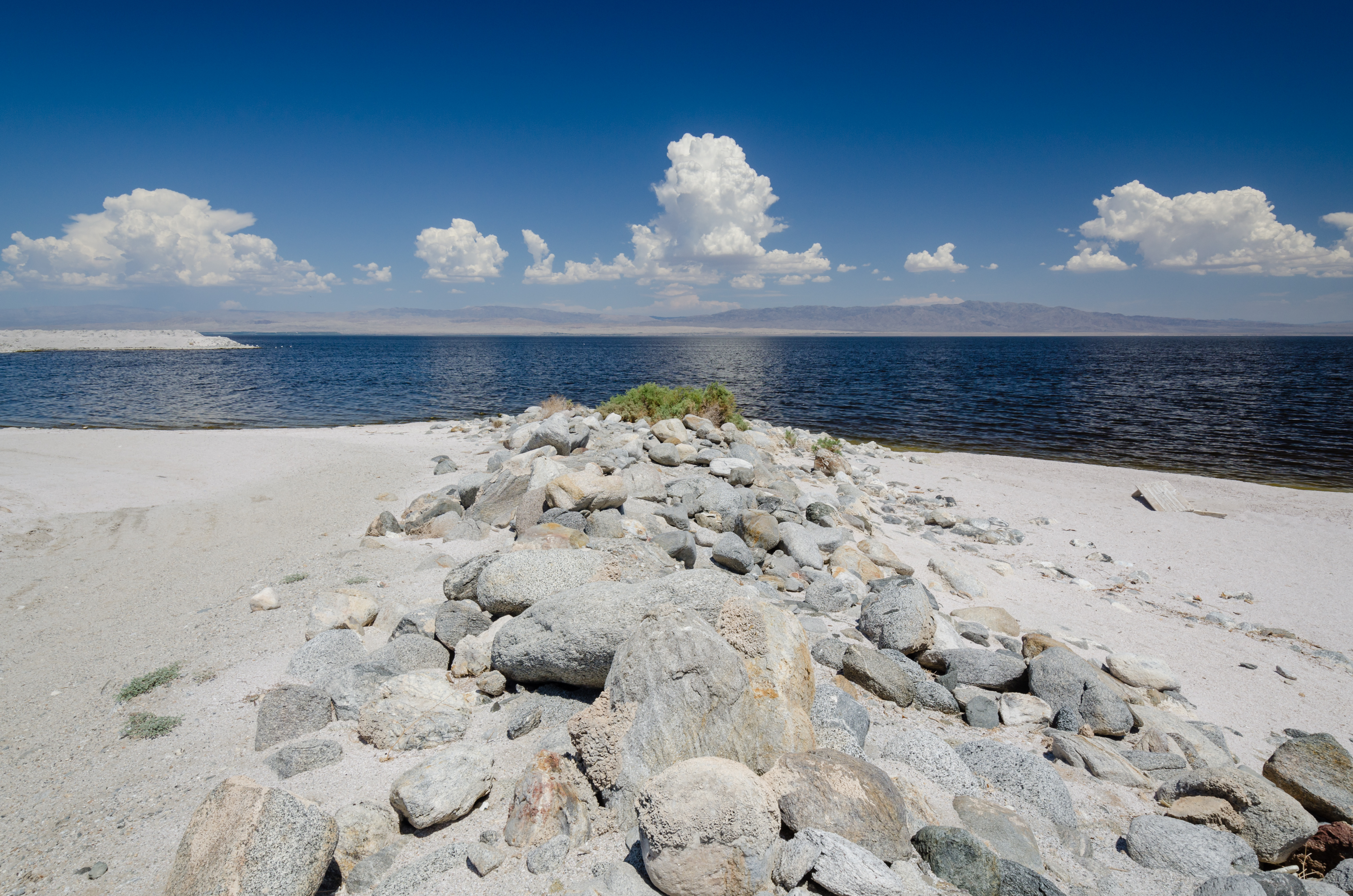
Salton Sea

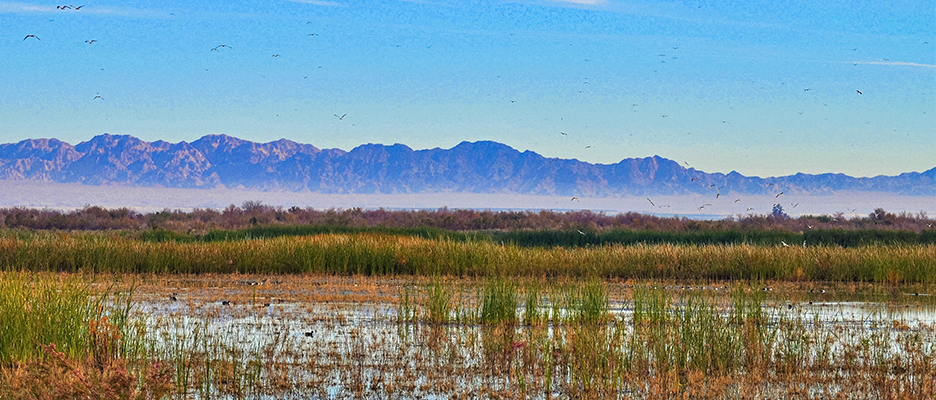
Sonny Bono Salton Sea National Wildlife Refuge

This is a topical guide to articles about the Salton Sea in southern California.

The Salton Sea is a shallow, landlocked, highly saline endorheic lake in Riverside and Imperial counties in Southern California. It lies on the San Andreas Fault within the Salton Trough, which stretches to the Gulf of California in Mexico. The lake is about 15 by 35 miles (24 by 56 km) at its widest and longest. The sea has a surface area at 318 square miles (820 km^{2}). The Salton Sea became a resort destination in the 20th century, but saw die-offs of fish and birds in the 1980s due to contamination from farm runoff, and clouds of toxic dust in the 21st century as evaporation exposed parts of the lake bed.

== Outline of the Salton Sea ==
=== Geography ===
- Salton Sea
- Salton Trough
- Salton Sink
- Salton Buttes
- Field Clark's Dry Lake
- Alamo River
- New River (Mexico–United States)
- Salt Creek (Salton Sea)
- Whitewater River (California)

=== Communities ===
- Bombay Beach, California
- Desert Shores, California
- Salton City, California
- Salton Sea Beach, California

=== Environment and conservation ===
- Sonny Bono Salton Sea National Wildlife Refuge
- Salton Sea State Recreation Area
- Salton Sea Authority
- Quantification Settlement Agreement

=== Miscellaneous ===
- California State Route 86
- Lithium Valley
- North Shore Beach and Yacht Club
- Naval Auxiliary Air Station Salton Sea
- Charles Robinson Rockwood
- Bombay Beach (film)
- Miracle in the Desert: The Rise and Fall of the Salton Sea
- Plagues & Pleasures on the Salton Sea
- The Salton Sea (2002 film)

== See also ==
- Timeline of the Salton Sea
- Bibliography of the Salton Sea
- Coachella Valley
- Colorado Desert
- Imperial County, California
- List of lakes of California
- Mojave Desert
- Riverside County, California
