= Astragalus crotalariae =

Salton milkvetch

Conservation status
- Least Concern (IUCN 3.1)

Scientific classification
- Kingdom: Plantae
- Clade: Tracheophytes
- Clade: Angiosperms
- Clade: Eudicots
- Clade: Rosids
- Order: Fabales
- Family: Fabaceae
- Subfamily: Faboideae
- Genus: Astragalus
- Species: A. crotalariae

Binomial name
- Astragalus crotalariae (Benth.) A.Gray

Species of legume

Astragalus crotalariae is a species of milkvetch known by the common name Salton milkvetch. It is native to the Colorado Desert in California and other Sonoran Deserts in Arizona and northern Mexico. It grows in desert scrub habitat, including the Salton Sink in the Coachella Valley.

== Description ==
Astragalus crotalariae is a bushy perennial herb growing to heights between 15 and 60 centimeters. It is roughly hairy and has an unpleasant scent. The leaves are up to 16 centimeters long and are made up of several pairs of thick oval-shaped to rounded leaflets. The open inflorescence bears up to 25 reddish purple flowers, each 2 to 3 centimeters long. The fruit is an inflated legume pod up to 3 centimeters long. It is usually roughly hairy and dries to a thick papery texture.

=== Selenium ===
Like many other Astragalus species, this plant accumulates selenium from the soil. It has also been shown to harbor a selenium-metabolizing Bacillus species in its seed pods.
