= Salton Sea Authority =

Joint Powers Authority in California

The Salton Sea Authority is a joint powers authority whose goal is the revitalization of the Salton Sea in California. It was created on June 2, 1993 by the U.S. state of California "for the purpose of ensuring the beneficial uses of the Salton Sea." It has representatives from the Coachella Valley Water District, the Imperial Irrigation District, Riverside County, Imperial County and the Torres Martinez Desert Cahuilla Indians.

The purpose of the Salton Sea Authority is to work with California state agencies, federal agencies, and Mexico to develop programs that would continue beneficial use of the Salton Sea. The Authority defines "beneficial use" to include the primary purpose of the Sea as a depository for agricultural drainage, storm water and wastewater flows; as well as for protection of endangered species, fisheries and waterfowl; and for recreational purposes. In 2006, the Authority issued a multi-purpose plan for the restoration of the Sea.

== Projects ==
Habitat Creation and Enhancement: Geotube technology and solar PV power on Salton Sea Playa, Torres Martinez Wetlands

The ponds and wetlands surrounding the main body of the Salton Sea have deteriorated or evaporated over time, contributing to the decline of wildlife and native species. This project, proposed in the 2012/2013 fiscal year, will attempt to restore some of these evaporated ponds and wetlands, located in the northern areas of the Sea, using GeoTube technology to implement new berms along the edges of these ponds and wetlands. The project area consists of eleven existing ponds, nine of which are located in the Torres Martinez wetlands, and 20 acres of proposed new habitat.

GeoTubes are large synthetic sandbags that are laid along the edges of a body of water or seafront to create new or support deteriorated levees or berms. The size of these tubes can reach up to many feet in diameter. These GeoTubes will create the outer walls necessary to contain the water located within these new ponds and wetlands. This project will rely on the use of solar panels, or solar PV power, to pump the continuing flow of water that is needed to feed these restored ponds and wetlands. The water source for these ponds will be from a combination of a local aquifer and Colorado River water.

This project will be monitored to track the amount of time rehabilitation of the natural habitat takes to re-enter and flourish to provide an example for future related projects.

Restoration of Red Hill Bay on the Salton Sea, California

The Red Hill Bay's project goal, proposed in the 2012/2013 fiscal year, is to restore and fill the currently exposed playa located in the southern area of the Salton Sea which spans over 650 acres. This project will first establish two pumping systems to feed water back into the bay allowing migratory birds to once again utilize the habitat. The project will then implement the use of berm technology on the eastern side and the western entrance of the bay, ensuring proper containment of the newly fed water. This newly pumped water will come from two sources, the Alamo River and the current salinated water of the Sea. This mixing of the two types of water will dilute the Sea's salinization levels to create a mixture capable of stabilizing and restoring the bay's natural habitat.

The Red Hill Bay project will be used as an example to monitor the amount of time it takes for wildlife and fish to re-establish themselves back into this natural habitat in order to predict the ecological success for future potential Salton Sea restoration projects. As of 2021, the project area remains flat, dry and dusty with budget issues and local politics delaying the work.
