= Desert Shores, California =

Desert Shores
- Unincorporated Community; Census-designated place
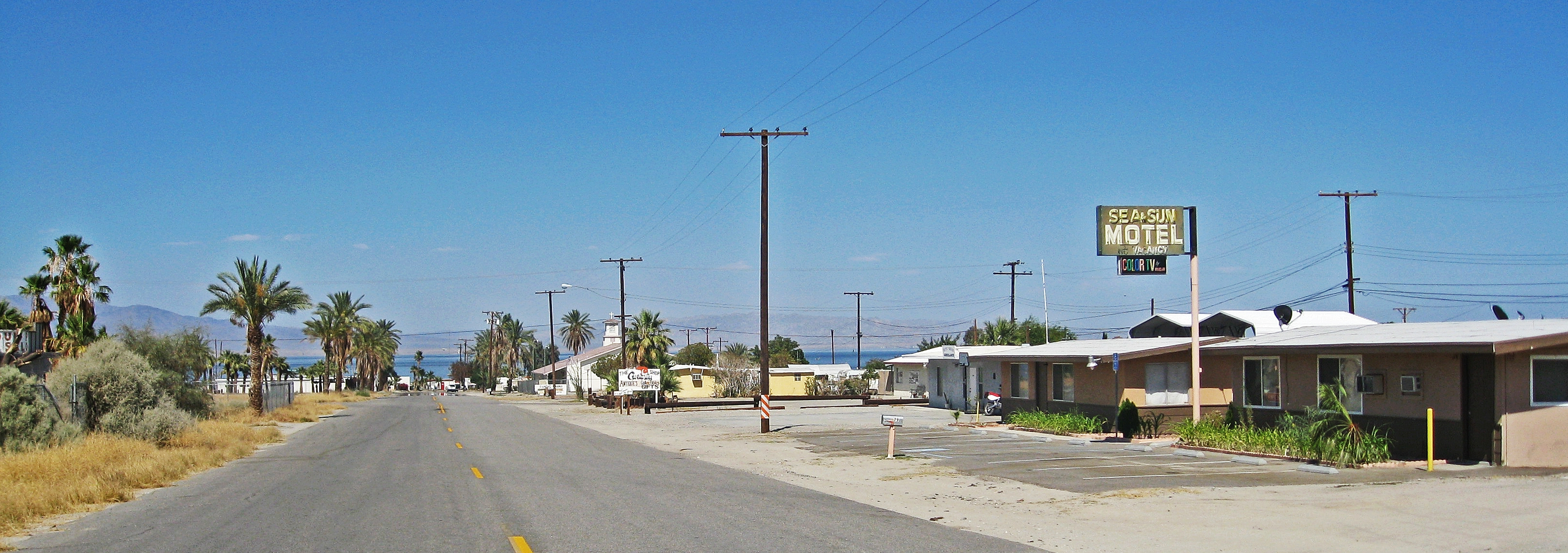
- View east through Desert Shores to the Salton Sea.

- Location in Imperial County and the state of California

- Location in the United States
- Coordinates: 33°24′15″N 116°02′23″W
- Country: United States
- State: California
- County: Imperial

Area
  - Total: 0.81 sq mi (2.10 km^{2})
  - Land: 0.70 sq mi (1.81 km^{2})
  - Water: 0.11 sq mi (0.29 km^{2}) 13.99%
- Elevation: −200 ft (−60 m)

Population (2020)
  - Total: 1,128
  - Density: 1,614.7/sq mi (623.44/km^{2})
- Time zone: UTC-8 (Pacific)
  - Summer (DST): UTC-7 (PDT)
- ZIP code: 92274
- Area codes: 442/760
- FIPS code: 06-19024
- GNIS feature IDs: 1693254, 2408665

Desert Shores (formerly Fish Springs) is a census-designated place (CDP) in Imperial County, California, US. It is part of the El Centro Metropolitan Statistical Area. As of the 2020 census, Desert Shores had a population of 1,128.

== Geography and climate ==
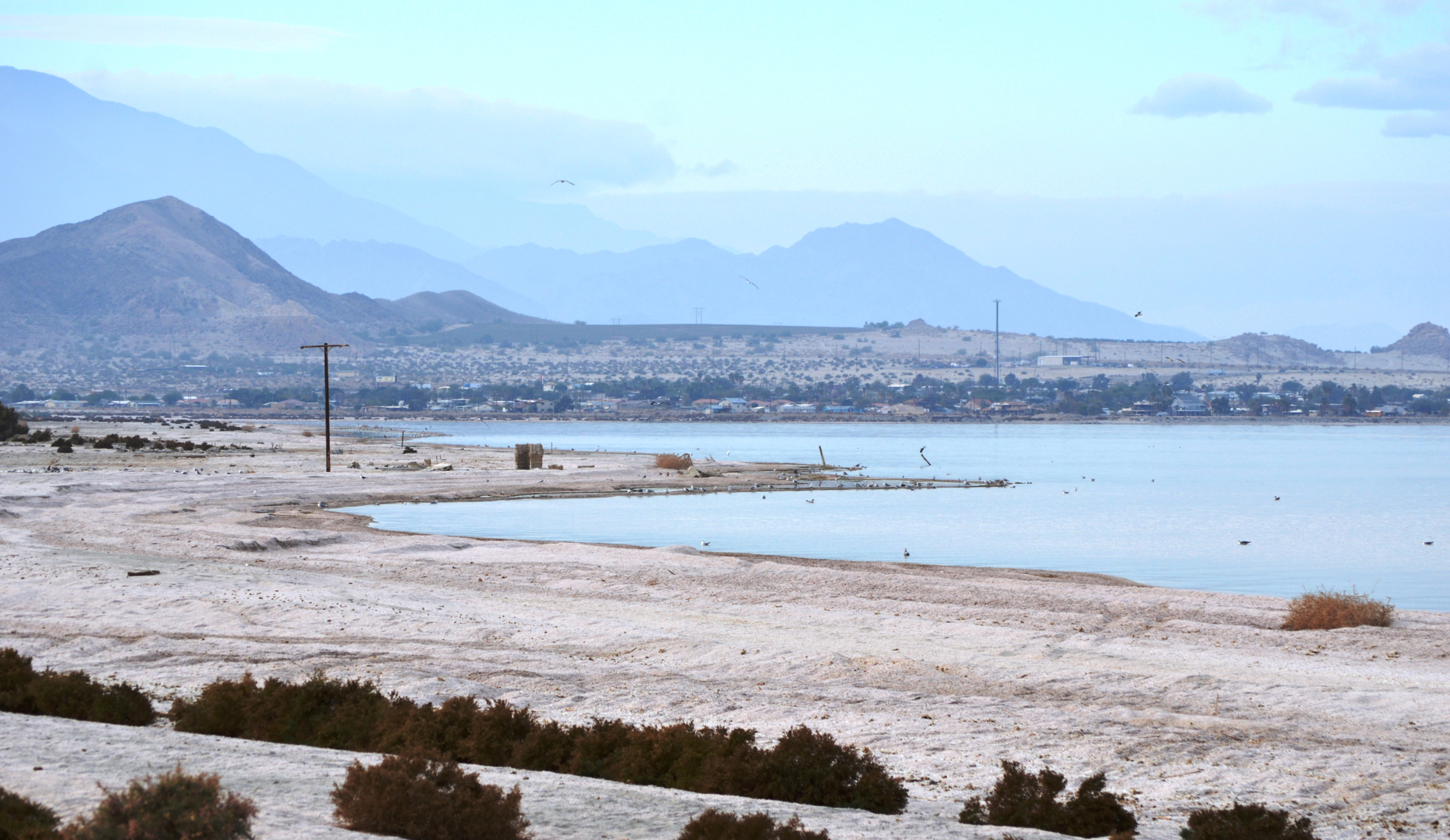
Desert Shores, as seen from the beach in the city of Salton Sea Beach

The town is located at the western shore of the Salton Sea in the Imperial Valley, within the Colorado Desert ecoregion. It is 36 miles (58 km) west-northwest of Calipatria. According to the United States Census Bureau, the CDP has a total area of 0.8 square miles (2.1 km^{2}), of which 0.7 square miles (1.8 km^{2}) is land and 0.1 square miles (0.26 km^{2}) is water.

The surficial geology is dominated by Quaternary-era alluvial sands and clays.

According to the Köppen Climate Classification system, Desert Shores has a subtropical hot-desert climate ("BWh"). The coldest month is December with an average daytime high temperature of 71 °F (22 °C) and an average nighttime low of 40 °F (4 °C), while July is the hottest month, with an average daytime high temperature of 108 °F (42 °C) and an average nighttime low of 76 °F (25 °C). The all-time record high temperature is 126 °F (52 °C), and the all-time record low temperature is 13 °F (−11 °C). Sunshine is abundant all year due to a large amount of descending high pressure, and rainfall averages about 3 inches (76 millimeters) annually.

Climate data for Desert Shores, California
Month	Jan	Feb	Mar	Apr	May	Jun	Jul	Aug	Sep	Oct	Nov	Dec	Year
Record high °F (°C)	93 (34)	100 (38)	107 (42)	110 (43)	119 (48)	126 (52)	125 (52)	123 (51)	126 (52)	117 (47)	100 (38)	95 (35)	126 (52)
Mean daily maximum °F (°C)	71.8 (22.1)	75.4 (24.1)	81.7 (27.6)	88.2 (31.2)	96.2 (35.7)	103.6 (39.8)	107.7 (42.1)	106.8 (41.6)	102.2 (39.0)	91.9 (33.3)	79.3 (26.3)	70.6 (21.4)	89.6 (32.0)
Mean daily minimum °F (°C)	40.8 (4.9)	44.2 (6.8)	50.3 (10.2)	56.1 (13.4)	63.8 (17.7)	69.9 (21.1)	76.3 (24.6)	76.3 (24.6)	69.7 (20.9)	58.8 (14.9)	46.7 (8.2)	39.5 (4.2)	57.7 (14.3)
Record low °F (°C)	13 (−11)	19 (−7)	23 (−5)	30 (−1)	32 (0)	48 (9)	53 (12)	51 (11)	45 (7)	28 (−2)	24 (−4)	18 (−8)	13 (−11)
Average precipitation inches (mm)	0.62 (16)	0.61 (15)	0.31 (7.9)	0.05 (1.3)	0.05 (1.3)	0 (0)	0.10 (2.5)	0.11 (2.8)	0.18 (4.6)	0.19 (4.8)	0.17 (4.3)	0.40 (10)	2.79 (71)

== Demographics ==
Historical population
Census	Pop.	Note	%±
2000	792		—
2010	1,104		39.4%
2020	1,128		2.2%
U.S. Decennial Census; 1860–1870 1880-1890; 1900 1910 1920; 1930 1940 1950; 1960 1970 1980; 1990 2000 2010

Desert Shores first appeared as a census-designated place in the 2000 U.S. census.

The population was 1,104 in 2010, up from 792 in 2000.

=== 2020 census ===
As of the 2020 census, Desert Shores had a population of 1,128. The population density was 1,613.7 inhabitants per square mile (623.1/km^{2}). The census reported that 98.6% of the population lived in households, 1.4% lived in non-institutionalized group quarters, and no one was institutionalized.

The age distribution was 316 people (28.0%) under the age of 18, 120 people (10.6%) aged 18 to 24, 283 people (25.1%) aged 25 to 44, 275 people (24.4%) aged 45 to 64, and 134 people (11.9%) who were 65 years of age or older. The median age was 32.1 years. For every 100 females, there were 109.7 males, and for every 100 females age 18 and over there were 106.6 males.

There were 326 households, out of which 120 (36.8%) had children under the age of 18 living in them. Of all households, 188 (57.7%) were married-couple households, 30 (9.2%) were cohabiting couple households, 59 (18.1%) had a male householder with no spouse or partner present, and 49 (15.0%) had a female householder with no spouse or partner present. 65 households (19.9%) were one person, and 38 (11.7%) had someone living alone who was 65 years of age or older. The average household size was 3.41. There were 242 families (74.2% of all households).

There were 379 housing units at an average density of 542.2 units per square mile (209.3 units/km^{2}), of which 326 (86.0%) were occupied. Of these, 219 (67.2%) were owner-occupied, and 107 (32.8%) were occupied by renters. The homeowner vacancy rate was 5.6% and the rental vacancy rate was 0.9%.

0.0% of residents lived in urban areas, while 100.0% lived in rural areas.

Racial composition as of the 2020 census
Race	Number	Percent
White	358	31.7%
Black or African American	5	0.4%
American Indian and Alaska Native	40	3.5%
Asian	1	0.1%
Native Hawaiian and Other Pacific Islander	1	0.1%
Some other race	543	48.1%
Two or more races	180	16.0%
Hispanic or Latino (of any race)	1,009	89.5%

=== 2010 census ===
The 2010 United States census reported that Desert Shores had a population of 1,104. The population density was 1,619.9 inhabitants per square mile (625.4/km^{2}). The racial makeup of Desert Shores was 709 (64.2%) White, 8 (0.7%) African American, 26 (2.4%) Native American, 4 (0.4%) Asian, 1 (0.1%) Pacific Islander, 307 (27.8%) from other races, and 49 (4.4%) from two or more races. Hispanic or Latino of any race were 848 persons (76.8%).

The Census reported that 1,104 people (100% of the population) lived in households, 0 (0%) lived in non-institutionalized group quarters, and 0 (0%) were institutionalized.

There were 344 households, out of which 167 (48.5%) had children under the age of 18 living in them, 181 (52.6%) were opposite-sex married couples living together, 37 (10.8%) had a female householder with no husband present, 27 (7.8%) had a male householder with no wife present. There were 29 (8.4%) unmarried opposite-sex partnerships, and 1 (0.3%) same-sex married couples or partnerships. 80 households (23.3%) were made up of individuals, and 42 (12.2%) had someone living alone who was 65 years of age or older. The average household size was 3.21. There were 245 families (71.2% of all households); the average family size was 3.84.

The population was spread out, with 352 people (31.9%) under the age of 18, 124 people (11.2%) aged 18 to 24, 263 people (23.8%) aged 25 to 44, 218 people (19.7%) aged 45 to 64, and 147 people (13.3%) who were 65 years of age or older. The median age was 29.9 years. For every 100 females, there were 108.7 males. For every 100 females age 18 and over, there were 98.4 males.

There were 421 housing units at an average density of 617.7 per square mile (238.5/km^{2}), of which 344 were occupied, of which 225 (65.4%) were owner-occupied, and 119 (34.6%) were occupied by renters. The homeowner vacancy rate was 4.2%; the rental vacancy rate was 2.4%. 704 people (63.8% of the population) lived in owner-occupied housing units and 400 people (36.2%) lived in rental housing units.

== Government ==
=== Local ===
Desert Shores and its neighboring community of Salton City are governed by the Salton Community Services District (SCSD), which is a special district per California Government Code. The legislative body of the SCSD is a five-member Board of Directors who are elected by the registered voters in the district for staggered four-year terms.

The SCSD has seven services that it is authorized to provide:

1. Collect, treat, or dispose of sewage.
2. Collect, transfer, and dispose of solid waste.
3. Acquire, construct recreational facilities.
4. Organize, promote community recreation.
5. Acquire, construct, and improve street lighting and landscaping.

Aside from acting as the architectural committee for architectural compliance with the Covenants, Conditions, and Restrictions (CC&R) of the 80 plus tracts within the district, the SCSD has no land use authority under existing law; that responsibility falls on the Imperial County Board of Supervisors.

Water service is provided by the Coachella Valley Water District.

Electric service is provided by Imperial Irrigation District.

=== State and federal ===
In the state legislature, Desert Shores is in the 18th senatorial district, represented by Democrat Steve Padilla, and the 36th Assembly district, represented by Republican Jeff Gonzalez.

Federally, Desert Shores is in California's 25th congressional district, represented by Democrat Raul Ruiz.

== In popular culture ==
The 2019 film Desert Shores was filmed in Desert Shores and around the Salton Sea. The movie is based on George McCormick's short story collection Salton Sea.

The town of Sandy Shores in the 2013 video game Grand Theft Auto V is based on Desert Shores and also nearby Bombay Beach.

== See also ==
- Outline of the Salton Sea
- El Centro Metropolitan Area
- San Diego–Imperial, California
