= New River (Mexico–United States) =

River that flows from Mexico into the United States

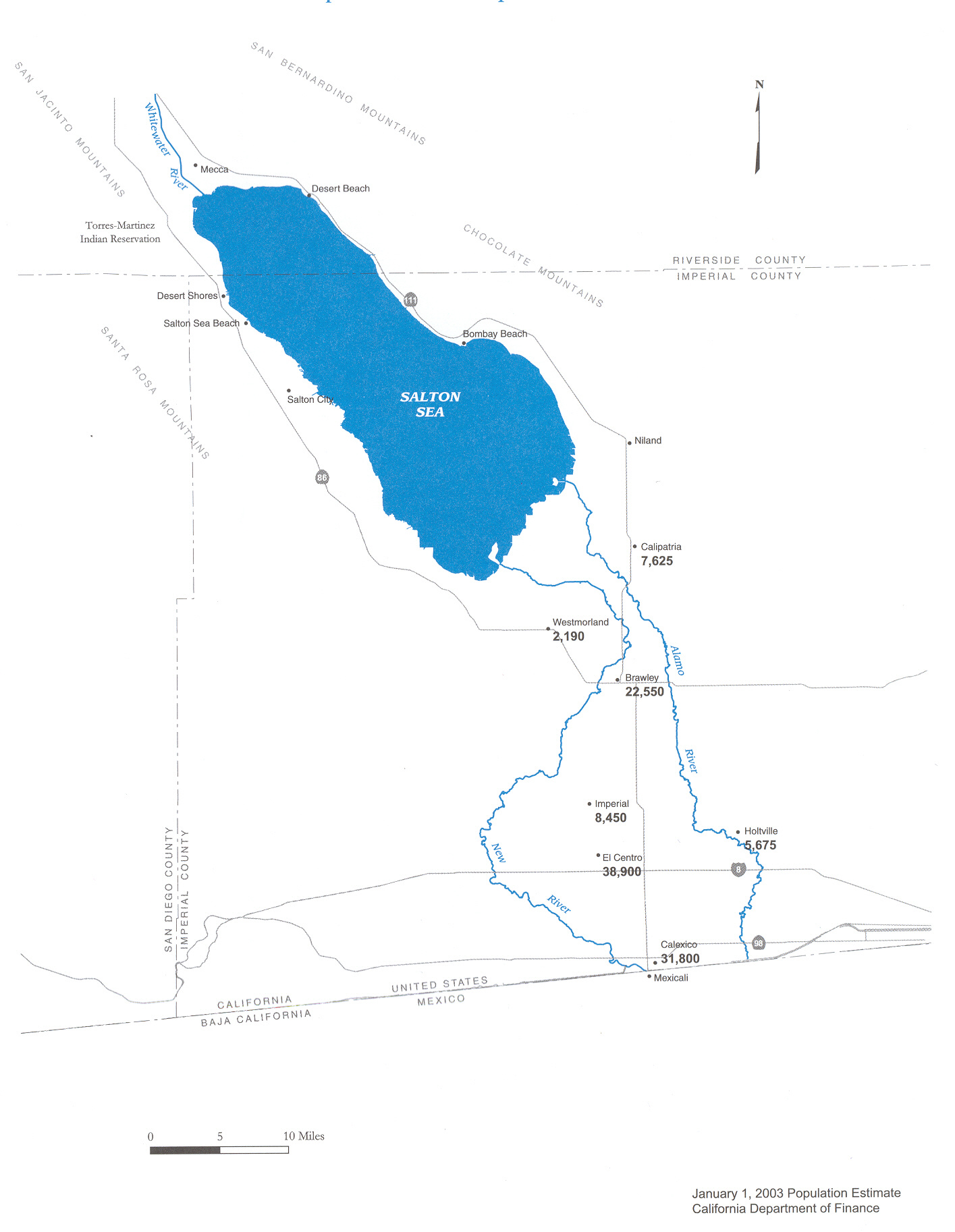
- Map of the New River (left) Watershed; Alamo River on the right.
- Native name: Río Nuevo (Spanish)

Location
- Country: United States, Mexico

Physical characteristics
- Source
  - location: near Cerro Prieto, Mexicali Municipality, Baja California, Mexico
  - coordinates: 32°22′45″N 115°14′37″W
- Mouth
  - location: Salton Sea, Imperial County, California
  - coordinates: 33°07′53″N 115°41′40″W
- Length: 125 km (78 mi)
- Discharge
  - average: 18 m^{3}/s (640 cu ft/s)

The New River (Spanish: Río Nuevo) flows north from near Cerro Prieto, through the city of Mexicali, Baja California, Mexico, into the United States through the city of Calexico, California, towards the Salton Sea. The river channel has existed since pre-historic times. The river as known today formed from a levee failure and massive flooding that filled the Salton Sea.

The river flow mostly consists of agricultural runoff, municipal discharge and industrial wastewater. The river has been called the most severely polluted river of its size in the United States. Several projects have begun to reduce and mitigate the levels of pollution in the river, including upgrades to sewage treatment infrastructure and enclosure of the river channel.

== Flow ==
The New River channel begins at a volcanic lake near Cerro Prieto. Today this lake feeds the Cerro Prieto Geothermal Power Station. The river flows north 15 miles (24 km) through Baja California, and another 66 miles (106 km) through California into the Salton Sea, the largest lake in California. Flow at the border is approximately 200 cu ft/s (5.7 m^{3}/s), and about three times more at the Salton Sea because of agricultural runoff collected along the way.

The New River's flow is composed of agricultural and chemical runoff waste from farm industry irrigation in the U.S. (18.4%) and Mexico (51.2%), sewage from Mexicali (29%), and manufacturing plants operating in Mexico (1.4%). Where New River crosses the Mexico–U.S. border near Calexico, California, its channel contains a stew of about a hundred contaminants: volatile organic compounds, heavy metals including selenium, uranium, arsenic and mercury, pesticides (including DDT), and PCBs. The waterway also contains pathogens that cause tuberculosis, encephalitis, polio, cholera, hepatitis and typhoid; levels for many of these contaminants violate United States Environmental Protection Agency (EPA) and Cal/EPA standards by several hundredfold.

Fecal coliform bacteria have reached 100,000 to 16 million colonies per milliliter at the border checkpoint (possibly more, as this is the measuring capacity threshold), far above the U.S.–Mexico treaty limit of 240 colonies. In 2017 monthly samples from the New River ranged from 12,000 to more than 160,000 per 100 milliliters. California considers water safe for swimming at 400.

Highly polluted inflow to the New River and agricultural runoff has resulted in elevated bacterial levels and large algal blooms in the Salton Sea. Lacking an outlet for its water, the Salton Sea's salinity has increased by approximately 1% per year. Increasing water temperature, salinity and bacterial levels led to massive fish die-offs in 1992, 1994, 1996, 1999, 2006, and 2008, and created ideal breeding grounds for avian botulism, cholera and Newcastle disease, leading to massive avian epizootics 1992–2019.

The Salton Sea has a salinity of 4.4% (4.4 parts per 100), making it saltier than ocean water (3.5% for Pacific). Many fish species can no longer reproduce or survive in the Salton Sea. Tilapia may be the only fish species able to persist there for a limited time. Without restoration, the Salton Sea will likely increase in toxicity and remain an ecological trap for avian species.

Toxic levels of PCBs, DDT, and DDT byproduct DDE regularly appear in sediment samples taken between 2002 and 2012.

== History ==
The modern courses of the New River and the Alamo River, and the creation of the Salton Sea, date from the autumn of 1904 when heavy rainfall and snowmelt caused the swollen Colorado River to overrun a set of headgates for the Alamo Canal. The resulting flood poured down the canal and breached an Imperial Valley dyke. The sudden influx of water and the lack of drainage from the basin formed the Salton Sea; the rivers had re-created a great inland sea in the Salton Sink, which had frequently flooded. Nearly two years passed before workers could control the Colorado River's flow and stop the flooding, but the river was effectively dammed in the early part of 1907 and returned to its normal course. The flood significantly enlarged the channels of the New and Alamo Rivers. Some water still flowed after the dyke was repaired, as the larger channels collected and carried agricultural runoff to the Salton Sea.

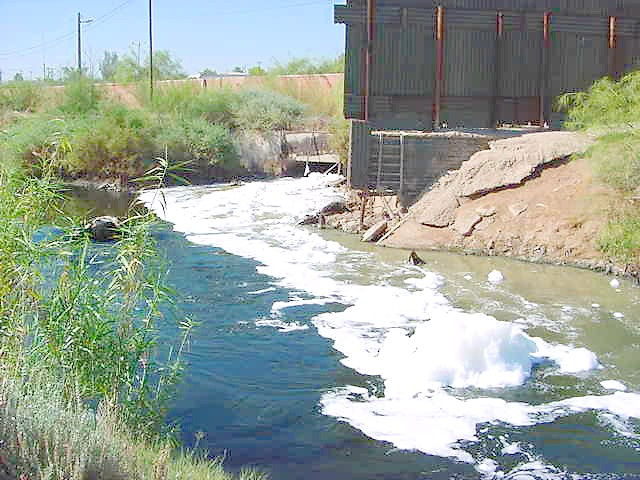
The New River at the US–Mexico border, carrying foam and mixing with wastewater from the International Drain

Although thorough documentation of the pollution before 1960 is not available, records show the New River has been identified as a significant water pollution problem since the late 1940s. Extremely high concentrations of fecal coliform bacteria caused a stench at its entry into the U.S. Under provisions of the 1944 Water Treaty with Mexico, the United States and Mexico agreed to solve border sanitation problems. The International Boundary and Water Commission (IBWC) was authorized by the two governments to study the pollution of the New River from Mexico.

Studies in 1947 and 1948 of the New River led the IBWC to recommend a joint treatment plant constructed in the United States to treat the sewage from Calexico and Mexicali.

As Mexicali's population exploded in the 1970s, pollution increased. Due to inadequate sewer infrastructure, the two nations attempted in the 1980s and 1990s to address pollution in this river, as documented by the International Boundary and Water Commission of the U.S. Department of State. The IBWC was established in 1889 to maintain the border, allocate river waters between the two nations, and provide for flood control and water sanitation. Once viewed as a model of international cooperation, in recent decades, the IBWC has been heavily criticized as an institutional anachronism, bypassed by modern social, environmental, and political issues.

After the North American Free Trade Agreement (NAFTA) in the 1990s, industrial manufacturing increasingly contributed to pollution. Mexico's relatively lax environmental regulations on manufacturing plants or maquiladoras, allowed these plants to use the New River as an industrial waste drainage system. Mexicali has become a bustling border city with over 180 maquiladoras.

In the 1990s, a joint project was implemented to improve Mexicali's wastewater infrastructure. The EPA paid 55% of a $50 million upgrade to Mexicali's sewage treatment facilities, but the improvements did not treat all waste discharges into the river. The residual pollution affects both Mexico and the Imperial Valley in California and is deposited in the Salton Sea.

In 2018, construction began on a bollard portion of the Mexico–United States barrier across the river. By 2018, most of the river in Mexicali was covered, but sometimes overflowed its covered riverbanks when it rained.

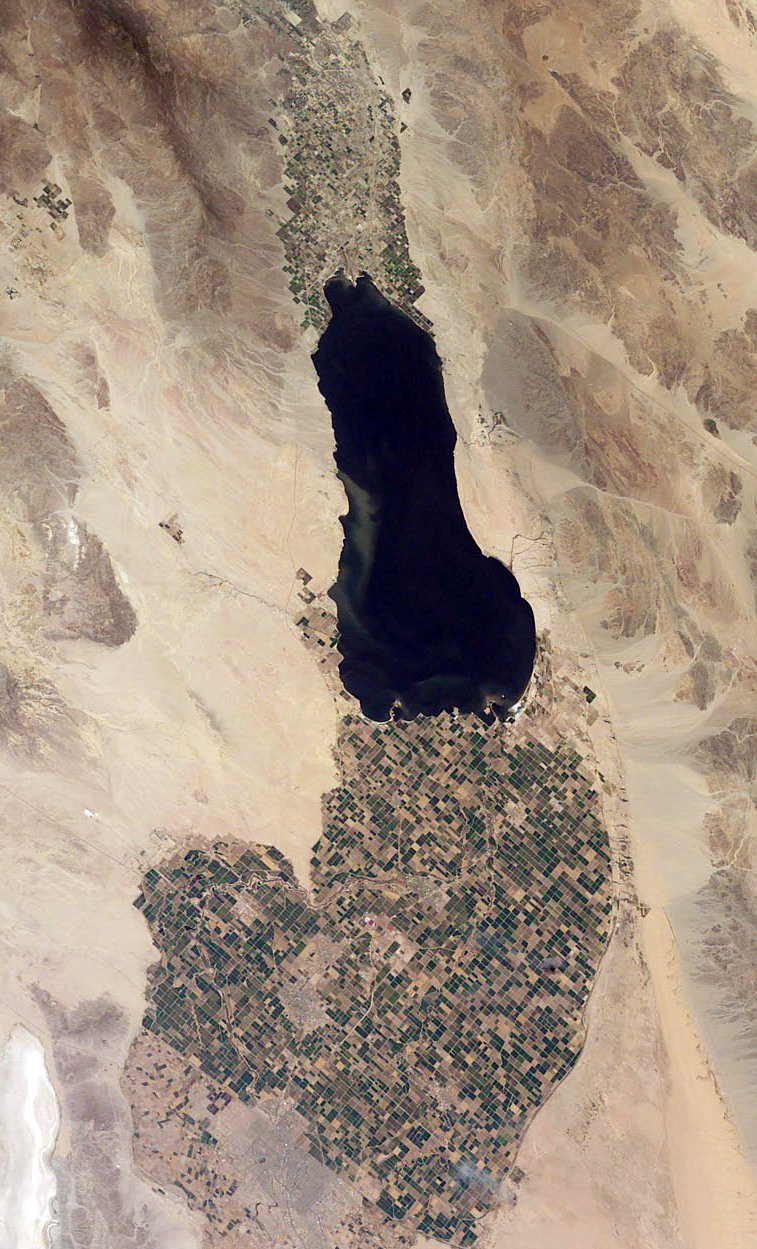
The Salton Sea and tributaries in the Imperial Valley as seen from the Space Shuttle.

== Environmental issues ==
The smell of the New River near the border is often overpowering, particularly at night and during the summer when temperatures can reach 120 °F (49 °C). The New River is so heavily polluted that technicians usually wear two sets of gloves, aprons, and other protective clothing when testing the water. US Border Patrol agents have instructions to stay out of the river except in emergencies. In January 2019, chemicals, heavy metals, and raw sewage was found to be in the New River. Discarded trash, dead animals and other waste line the channel, whose foam blows into the streets of a Calexico residential area and its downtown. Mosquitoes and other pests thrive in the summer. All of these factors only serve to elevate the contagion risk.

In 2006, through another binational project, Mexicali finished building a second wastewater treatment facility to treat the 10 to 20 million US gallons (38,000 to 76,000 m^{3}) per day of raw and partially treated sewage that was being discharged into the river. In May 2005, the New River was designated as one of two environmental justice water quality pilot projects for the State of California Environmental Protection Agency (CalEPA) to try to address the various pollution sources collaboratively between the various stakeholders.

The California Office of Environmental Health Hazard Assessment has issued a safe eating advisory for any fish caught in New River due to elevated levels of mercury, DDTs, PCBs, and selenium.

=== Legislative Changes: SB 387 ===
On July 25, 2005, Governor of California Arnold Schwarzenegger signed Senate Bill 387, introduced by Senator Denise Moreno Ducheny (D-San Diego), which provided funding for the New River Improvement Project. It involves four main components:

1. A trash screen;
2. Construction of an enclosed box culvert alongside the current river channel through the developed areas of Calexico so that normal flow can be re-routed into the culvert, thereby eliminating resident exposure and allowing for treatment of contaminated flows;
3. Construction of wetlands to address overall pollution, including pollution from sources in the United States; and
4. Construction of green belts and recreational facilities in a restored New River floodplain.

=== Outlook ===
According to the Colorado River Regional Water Quality Control Board, once the new wastewater treatment facility is fully operational, it will handle the 10 to 20 million US gallons (38,000 to 76,000 m^{3}) per day of raw sewage currently being discharged into the New River. While this should result in measurably improved water quality of the New River at the border, particularly as it relates to pathogens and nutrients, the binational projects do not address the dumping of trash into the New River and its tributaries, the nutrients and pathogens from Mexicali's Zaragoza wastewater treatment lagoons, the untreated and partially treated discharges of industrial wastes, agricultural runoff from the Mexicali Valley, and urban and storm runoff from the municipality.

Mexico intends to reclaim effluent from the treatment plant for onsite green belts, resulting in a 20 million US gallons (76,000 m^{3}) per day decrease in the flow of the New River at the border, in addition to the projected 10 million US gallons (38,000 m^{3}) per day decrease in flow in the river at the border when the InterGen and Sempra Energy power plants reach capacity in Mexicali. The estimated decrease in flow due to projects pursuant to the terms of the Quantification Settlement Agreement, and water transfer between the Imperial Irrigation District and the San Diego County Water Authority, will have devastating water quality impacts on the Salton Sea.

According to the Imperial Irrigation District, although water pollution is a severe problem at the border, by the time the river enters the Salton Sea, the issue is "not significant"; water quality improves as the water makes its way north due to the addition of agricultural drain water and through natural cleansing occurring in the intervening 60 miles (97 km). Agricultural pesticides have never been detected in the Salton Sea at levels high enough to cause a public health concern.

== See also ==
- List of most-polluted rivers
- Lake Cahuilla
- Salton Sea
- Tributaries of the Salton Sea
- Mexico–United States border
- Calexico, California
- Mexicali
