= San Diego County Water Authority =

Regional wholesaler of water in Southern California

Wholesale Water Supplier overview
- Formed: June 1944
- Headquarters: Kearny Mesa, San Diego
- Website: www.sdcwa.org

The San Diego County Water Authority (SDCWA) is a wholesale supplier of water to the roughly western third of San Diego County, California, United States. The Water Authority was formed in 1944 by the California State Legislature. SDCWA serves 22 member agencies with 34 Board of Director members. In addition to local water sources, water is imported from the Colorado River and the Sacramento–San Joaquin River Delta through the Metropolitan Water District of Southern California. SDCWA is the sole recipient of fresh water produced by the Claude "Bud" Lewis Carlsbad Desalination Plant.

== History ==
Spanish missionaries in the San Diego area in 1769 noticed that the local water supply was in need of infrastructure, such as dams and aqueducts, to increase supply to the area. One of the first water projects in San Diego was Old Mission Dam which preceded the erection of six privately funded dams between 1887 and 1897, all of which are still exist today. Through an act of California state legislation, the San Diego County Water Authority was created in 1944 to oversee San Diego County’s water rights over the Colorado River. In 1952 San Diego started receiving water from the State Water Project from pipelines built by SDCWA. The Capital Improvement Program (CIP) was created in 1989 to lower the need for imported water to the region. In 2003 the Quantification Settlement Agreement was signed with the Imperial Irrigation District, the single largest user of the Colorado River in Southern California. SDCWA funded repairs to leaky canals which included lining canals with concrete. For 110 years, the water district will receive 80,000 acre-feet (99 million cubic meters) of water via this agreement. In 2015 SDCWA started supplementing their supply with water from the Carlsbad desalination plant. By 2035 it is projected that local water will meet the region's water demands.

== Water sources ==
The San Diego County Water Authority supplies its members both imported and local water resources. Imported water used by SDCWA comes from the Sacramento–San Joaquin rivers through State Water Project aqueducts, and from the Colorado River (through the Colorado River Aqueduct). California is one of seven states which receive water from The Colorado River. Around 17% of the water supplied through SDCWA comes from the State Water Project. Local sources from the Metropolitan Water District include recycled water, groundwater pumping, and desalinated water from the Carlsbad Desalination Plant. The Carlsbad desalination plant can supply up to 56,000 acre-feet (69 million cubic metres) of water. The rates are among the highest in Southern California.

== Governance ==
Members served by SDCWA include cities, water districts, irrigation districts, municipal water districts, public utility districts, and a military base.

The Water Authority was formed in 1944 by the California State Legislature and operates under the County Water Authority Act, which can be found in the California State Water Code. SDCWA head quarters are located in Kearny Mesa. Current leadership includes Jim Madaffer (Chair), Gary Crocher (Vice Chair), and Christy Guerin (Secretary).

The following agencies purchase water from the Water Authority:

- Carlsbad Municipal Water District
- City of Del Mar
- City of Escondido
- Helix Water District
- Lakeside Water District
- National City (Member of Sweetwater Authority)
- City of Oceanside
- Olivenhain Municipal Water District
- Otay Water District
- Padre Dam Municipal Water District
- Camp Pendleton Marine Corps Base
- City of Poway
- Ramona Municipal Water District
- Rincon Del Diablo Municipal Water District
- City of San Diego
- San Dieguito Water District
- Santa Fe Irrigation District
- South Bay Irrigation District (Member of Sweetwater Authority)
- Sweetwater Authority
- Vallecitos Water District
- Valley Center Municipal Water District
- Vista Irrigation District
- Yuima Municipal Water District

== Current Projects ==
The Water Authority’s government relations team monitors and analyzes state and federal legislation that could affect San Diego County’s water supply. Since 1989, the Capital Improvement Program (CIP) has funded and overseen infrastructure projects—such as pipelines, pump stations, and treatment facilities—to meet the region’s long-term water demands. One of the CIP’s flagship initiatives is the $1.5 billion Emergency and Carryover Storage Project, a contingency storage system designed to maintain supply if imported deliveries are interrupted. The project includes raising San Vicente Dam, constructing new reservoirs, laying strategic pipelines, and installing pumping stations to secure up to 90 days of additional local water storage. In partnership with Poseidon Water, SDCWA provided financing and water purchase agreements for the Claude "Bud" Lewis Carlsbad Desalination Plant, which commenced operations in December 2015. At start-up, the plant was the world’s largest seawater desalination facility, supplying up to 50 million gallons per day to San Diego County. In January 2020, the 2020 Urban Water Management Plan was developed with 6 elements outlining future forecast, savings, supply and reliability, and planning and shortage analysis in the region that SDCWA manages.

== Consumer Programs ==
SDCWA has water saving incentive programs for both residential and commercial consumers.

=== Residential Programs ===
Residential programs include water saving tips for both indoor and outdoor uses, as well as gardening demonstrations. Residential incentives include rebates for high-efficiency washers and toilets for indoor use, and rebates on sprinkler nozzles, rain barrels, and turf replacement for outdoor water use.

=== Business Programs ===
For businesses, the SDCWA has incentives including both indoor and outdoor water efficiency rebates and programs including their community partnering program run through the Metropolitan Water Districts Innovative Conservation Program (ICP). ICP does work to evaluate water saving technology and their efficiencies. The ICP provides funding with the help of the U.S. Bureau of Reclamation (USBR), Environmental Protection Agency (EPA), Southern Nevada Water Authority (SNWA), the Central Arizona Project (CAP), the Southern California Gas Company, and Western Resource Advocates.

=== Contractor Programs ===
For contractors the SDCWA has a WaterSmart Contractor Incentive Program (WSCIP), where participants can purchase water saving devices to use in their watering systems.

=== Educational Programs ===
SDCWA also runs water conservation programs in both educational and practical applications.
