= Salton City, California =

Salton City
- Unincorporated community Census-designated place
- Location in Imperial County and the state of California

- Location in Southern California Location in California Location in the United States
- Coordinates: 33°17′55″N 115°57′22″W
- Country: United States
- State: California
- County: Imperial

Area
  - Total: 21.437 sq mi (55.522 km^{2})
  - Land: 21.437 sq mi (55.522 km^{2})
  - Water: 0 sq mi (0 km^{2}) 0%
- Elevation: −125 ft (−38 m)

Population (April 1, 2020)
  - Total: 5,155
  - Density: 240.5/sq mi (92.85/km^{2})
- Time zone: UTC-8 (Pacific)
  - Summer (DST): UTC-7 (PDT)
- ZIP code: 92275
- Area code: 442/760
- FIPS code: 06-64294
- GNIS feature IDs: 1853413, 2409242

Salton City is a census-designated place (CDP) in Imperial County, California. It is the largest Imperial County development on the Salton Sea coast. It is part of the El Centro, California Metropolitan Statistical Area. The 2020 census reported a population of 5,155, up from 3,763 at the 2010 census and 978 in 2000.

Although planned and developed as a large resort community with an extensive road, water, sewer and power grid capable of supporting 40,000 residents on 12,000 residential lots, demand for property in Salton City fell drastically short of the planners' expectations. According to the 2010 census, 81% of the surveyed lots in Salton City remain undeveloped, and 38% of the habitable residences in Salton City are unoccupied. Despite Salton City's higher population compared to nearby Salton Sea communities such as Bombay Beach and Desert Shores, the eerie, mostly-abandoned appearance of the area has led some to call it a modern ghost town.

== History ==
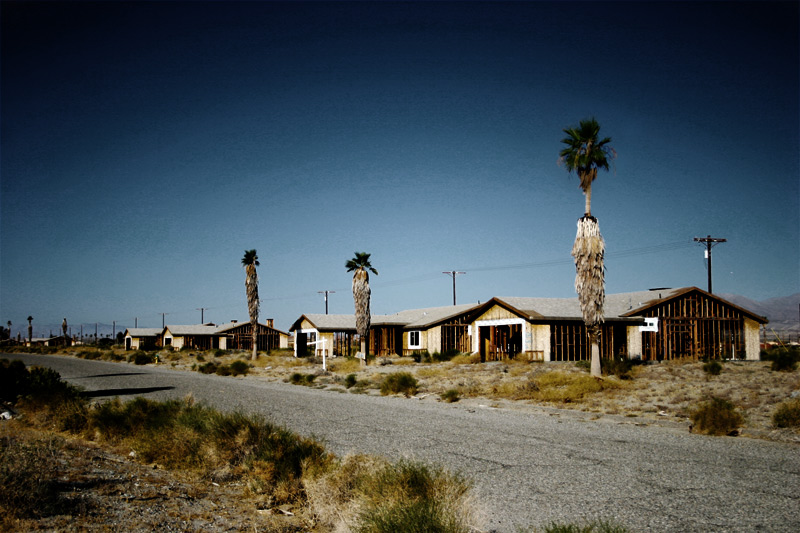
Four unfinished and abandoned houses in Salton City, CA on the west shore of Salton Sea

Salton City was developed in the 1960s and established in 1958 primarily by M. Penn Phillips and the Holly Corporation, the Texas-based oil refiner and land developer. It was intended to be a resort community on the Salton Sea, a saline, endorheic rift lake located directly on the San Andreas Fault, yet by 1965 limited development was achieved due to its isolation and lack of local employment opportunities and the downfall of the town began.

In the 1970s, most of the buildings constructed along the shoreline, including the city's marina were abandoned due to rising sea elevation. In the 1980s, the Imperial Irrigation District took proactive water conservation measures to reduce the flow of unused canal water into the Salton Sea. Throughout the 1980s and 1990s, as salinity and suspected pollution levels in the Salton Sea increased, the attraction of the Salton Sea as a recreational destination diminished. Most of the original tourist related structures fell during this time, including the Truckhaven Cafe, the Salton Bay Yacht Club hotel and restaurant, and the Holly House motel and restaurant (later renamed Desser House and then the Sundowner).

In the 2000s, development in Salton City began to rise as a result of the escalating California housing market. Cheap land and housing costs, improvements to Highway 86, and a casino opened by Torres-Martinez Desert Cahuilla Indians attracted new residents.

== Geography ==
According to the United States Census Bureau, the CDP has a total area of 21.4 square miles (55 km^{2}), all land. This area makes Salton City the largest city or town in terms of land area in the Imperial Valley.

Salton City is located on relatively flat ground. Several washes flow from the mountains to the west creating small gorges where any flowing run-off will drain into the Salton Sea. The vegetation consists of mostly sparse desert shrubs; however, in developed areas a variety of palm trees as well as other deciduous trees survive. Salton City is positioned between the eastern slope of the Peninsular Ranges and the western coast of the Salton Sea.

Earthquakes are an extremely common occurrence around the Salton Sea, and in Salton City, due to dozens of fractured fault lines that run through Imperial County. Salton City is also mere miles from major, destructive fault lines, such as the Imperial Fault, the San Andreas Fault, and the San Jacinto Fault. The Superstition Faults also pose a major risk to the area, as well as the Brawley Seismic Zone, which produces frequent yet mostly non-damaging earthquake swarms. At certain times, this area can experience dozens of felt earthquakes in a time period lasting from one day to over one week. Most of the earthquakes are minor to moderate and pose no hazard due to strict seismic codes; however, the area is notorious for earthquake swarms and other major seismic events. The San Andreas Fault begins at Bombay Beach where the southern terminus of the San Andreas transitions into the Brawley Seismic Zone, about ten miles across the Salton Sea from Salton City. Most residents are fully accustomed to minor and moderate earthquakes, but are prepared for a large one.

To the north of the CDP are Salton Sea Beach and Desert Shores. Salton City is approximately 50 miles (80 km) from the Imperial County seat of El Centro and 110 and 115 miles respectively from the coastal San Diego County cities of Oceanside and San Diego.

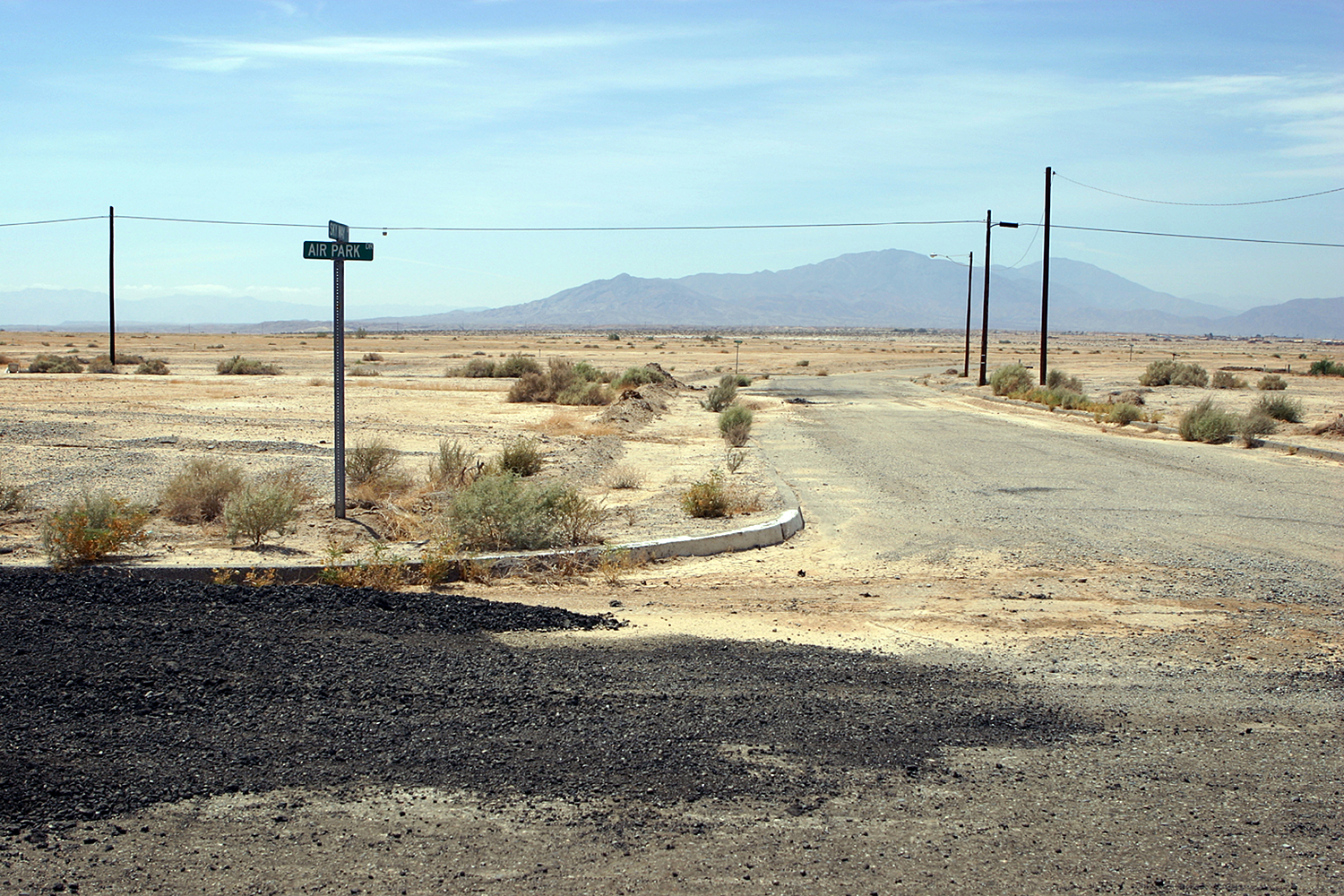
Part of the road system laid out in Salton City that was never used

=== Climate ===
This area has a large amount of sunshine throughout the year, due to the amount of descending high pressure aloft. According to the Köppen Climate Classification system, Salton City has a hot desert climate. However, Salton City experiences its own microclimate due to the proximity of the warm lake waters. Humidity is significantly higher along the shore during the warmer months, from May through September. Its climate can mimic a tropical climate at times, with exceptionally high dewpoints for an arid desert, but this typically happens for only a part of the day, or a few days in a row at the most. Once winds prevail from the northwest, the climate is similar to other areas in Imperial County that are not along the Salton Sea. Salton City itself is extraordinarily dry, and did not measure an inch of rain between September 2016 and August 2021. Any rain is rare, and even moderate rain can cause road closures, roads washed out, and other damage. The area is not equipped to handle any rainfall.

Climate data for Salton City, CA
| Month | Jan | Feb | Mar | Apr | May | Jun | Jul | Aug | Sep | Oct | Nov | Dec | Year |
|---|---|---|---|---|---|---|---|---|---|---|---|---|---|
| Record high °F (°C) | 96 (36) | 96 (36) | 104 (40) | 117 (47) | 124 (51) | 126 (52) | 125 (52) | 124 (51) | 126 (52) | 111 (44) | 98 (37) | 90 (32) | 126 (52) |
| Mean daily maximum °F (°C) | 67.8 (19.9) | 73.8 (23.2) | 79.4 (26.3) | 85.1 (29.5) | 93.9 (34.4) | 102.6 (39.2) | 105.7 (40.9) | 105.4 (40.8) | 101.0 (38.3) | 90.3 (32.4) | 78.2 (25.7) | 68.8 (20.4) | 87.7 (30.9) |
| Mean daily minimum °F (°C) | 39.4 (4.1) | 44.8 (7.1) | 49.4 (9.7) | 57.1 (13.9) | 61.6 (16.4) | 68.8 (20.4) | 76.6 (24.8) | 77.0 (25.0) | 70.8 (21.6) | 59.6 (15.3) | 47.9 (8.8) | 38.4 (3.6) | 57.6 (14.2) |
| Record low °F (°C) | 22 (−6) | 22 (−6) | 30 (−1) | 35 (2) | 43 (6) | 50 (10) | 51 (11) | 60 (16) | 49 (9) | 36 (2) | 27 (−3) | 14 (−10) | 14 (−10) |
| Average precipitation inches (mm) | 0.43 (11) | 0.41 (10) | 0.34 (8.6) | 0.10 (2.5) | 0.04 (1.0) | 0.00 (0.00) | 0.13 (3.3) | 0.27 (6.9) | 0.30 (7.6) | 0.28 (7.1) | 0.20 (5.1) | 0.46 (12) | 2.96 (75.1) |
Source: http://www.wrcc.dri.edu/cgi-bin/cliMAIN.pl?ca4223

== Demographics ==
Despite a long period of population decline, the population of Salton City has been increasing in recent years.

Historical population
| Census | Pop. | Note | %± |
|---|---|---|---|
| 2000 | 978 | | — |
| 2010 | 3,763 | | 284.8% |
| 2020 | 5,155 | | 37.0% |
U.S. Decennial Census; 1860–1870 1880-1890; 1900 1910 1920; 1930 1940 1950; 1960 1970 1980; 1990 2000 2010; 2020

Salton City first appeared as a census-designated place in the 2000 U.S. census.

=== 2020 census ===
As of the 2020 census, Salton City had a population of 5,155. The population density was 240.5 inhabitants per square mile (92.9/km^{2}). The age distribution was 31.0% under the age of 18, 10.1% aged 18 to 24, 26.0% aged 25 to 44, 20.3% aged 45 to 64, and 12.5% who were 65 years of age or older. The median age was 31.3 years. For every 100 females, there were 106.0 males, and for every 100 females age 18 and over there were 103.1 males.

The Census reported that the whole population lived in households. Of residents, 0.0% lived in urban areas, while 100.0% lived in rural areas.

There were 1,496 households, out of which 45.4% included children under the age of 18. Of all households, 50.4% were married-couple households, 10.0% were cohabiting couple households, 20.9% had a female householder with no spouse or partner present, and 18.7% had a male householder with no spouse or partner present. About 19.0% of households were one person, and 9.9% were one person aged 65 or older. The average household size was 3.45. There were 1,127 families (75.3% of all households).

There were 1,936 housing units at an average density of 90.3 units per square mile (34.9 units/km^{2}), of which 1,496 (77.3%) were occupied. Of occupied units, 69.0% were owner-occupied and 31.0% were occupied by renters. The homeowner vacancy rate was 3.6%, and the rental vacancy rate was 11.8%.

Racial composition as of the 2020 census
| Race | Number | Percent |
|---|---|---|
| White | 1,690 | 32.8% |
| Black or African American | 86 | 1.7% |
| American Indian and Alaska Native | 126 | 2.4% |
| Asian | 35 | 0.7% |
| Native Hawaiian and Other Pacific Islander | 6 | 0.1% |
| Some other race | 2,183 | 42.3% |
| Two or more races | 1,029 | 20.0% |
| Hispanic or Latino (of any race) | 4,120 | 79.9% |

=== 2010 census ===
The 2010 United States census reported that Salton City had a population of 3,763. The population density was 175.6 inhabitants per square mile (67.8/km^{2}). The racial makeup of Salton City was 2,260 (60.1%) White, 80 (2.1%) African American, 61 (1.6%) Native American, 61 (1.6%) Asian, 5 (0.1%) Pacific Islander, 1,159 (30.8%) from other races, and 137 (3.6%) from two or more races. There were 2,368 Hispanic or Latino people of any race (62.9%).

The Census reported that 3,763 people (100% of the population) lived in households, 0 (0%) lived in non-institutionalized group quarters, and 0 (0%) were institutionalized.

There were 1,204 households, out of which 513 (42.6%) had children under the age of 18 living in them, 653 (54.2%) were opposite-sex married couples living together, 134 (11.1%) had a female householder with no husband present, 91 (7.6%) had a male householder with no wife present. There were 67 (5.6%) unmarried opposite-sex partnerships, and 12 (1.0%) same-sex married couples or partnerships. 269 households (22.3%) were made up of individuals, and 133 (11.0%) had someone living alone who was 65 years of age or older. The average household size was 3.13. There were 878 families (72.9% of all households); the average family size was 3.73.

The population was spread out, with 1,247 people (33.1%) under the age of 18, 350 people (9.3%) aged 18 to 24, 890 people (23.7%) aged 25 to 44, 813 people (21.6%) aged 45 to 64, and 463 people (12.3%) who were 65 years of age or older. The median age was 31.3 years. For every 100 females, there were 101.4 males. For every 100 females age 18 and over, there were 103.1 males.

There were 2,026 housing units at an average density of 94.5 per square mile (36.5/km^{2}), of which 1,204 were occupied, of which 833 (69.2%) were owner-occupied, and 371 (30.8%) were occupied by renters. The homeowner vacancy rate was 18.0%; the rental vacancy rate was 20.3%. 2,425 people (64.4% of the population) lived in owner-occupied housing units and 1,338 people (35.6%) lived in rental housing units.

=== Income and poverty ===
In 2023, the US Census Bureau estimated that the median household income was $36,915, and the per capita income was $18,503. About 14.9% of families and 14.3% of the population were below the poverty line.

=== Housing ===
From 2004 to 2007, Salton City experienced a housing boom. Several hundred new houses were built.

== Government ==
=== Local ===
Salton City and the neighboring community of Desert Shores are governed by the Salton Community Services District (SCSD), a special district per California Code. The SCSD provides sewage treatment, emergency medical services, recreational centers, street lighting, and landscaping to Salton City and its neighboring communities.

The legislative body of the SCSD is a five-member Board of Directors who serve four-year terms. Aside from acting as the architectural committee for architectural compliance with the covenants, conditions, and restrictions of the 80-plus tracts within the district, the SCSD has no land use authority under existing law; that responsibility falls on the Imperial County Board of Supervisors.

Fire protection and emergency medical services in Salton City are provided by the Imperial County Fire Department.

Law enforcement in Salton City is provided by the Imperial County Sheriff's Office North County Patrol Division, which operates a substation in Salton City.

Water service is provided by the Coachella Valley Water District.

Electric service is provided by Imperial Irrigation District.

=== State and Federal ===
In the state legislature, Salton City is in the 18th senatorial district, represented by Democrat Steve Padilla, and the 36th Assembly district, represented by Republican Jeff Gonzalez.

Federally, Salton City is in California's 25th congressional district, represented by Democrat Raul Ruiz.

== In media ==
=== Literature ===
The 1996 non-fiction book Into the Wild by Jon Krakauer mentions Salton City as a place where Chris McCandless stopped in his travels.

J. A. Jance's novel Trial by Fire is partly set in Salton City.

In Sue Grafton's 1982 novel, A is for Alibi, Kinsey Millhone travels to the Salton Sea (presumably Salton City) for an interview with Greg Fife, who is living in a trailer by the sea.

Salton City was a location for a gambling loan in Norm Macdonald's pseudo-biographical book Based on a True Story: Not a Memoir.

=== Music ===
"Salton City" is the name of a track on the Hot Snakes' 2000 album Automatic Midnight.

=== Television ===
Salton City has been featured in various television series due to its "ghost town"-like nature. Salton City has been featured in the sixteenth episode of the television series Life After People, the "Los Angeles" episode of the Travel Channel series Off Limits, an episode of Forgotten Planet, and an episode of the Viceland series Abandoned.

Salton City was featured in an episode of the Discovery Channel series Wheeler Dealers when the team converted a Land Rover Series II into a "bug-out" vehicle.

Salton City was featured in an episode of the television series S.W.A.T..

== See also ==
- Outline of the Salton Sea
- Imperial Valley
