= Coachella Valley Water District =

Special district in California, US

Agency overview
- Formed: 1918
- Headquarters: Coachella, California; 33°40′00″N 116°10′00″W
- Website: www.cvwd.org

The Coachella Valley Water District is an independent special district formed in 1918, specifically to protect and conserve local water sources in the Coachella Valley. Since then, the district has grown into a multi-faceted agency that delivers irrigation and domestic (drinking) water, collects and recycles wastewater, provides regional storm water protection, replenishes the groundwater basin and promotes water conservation.

CVWD's service area covers approximately 1,000 square miles in Southern California from the San Gorgonio Pass to the Salton Sea, mostly within the Coachella Valley in Riverside County, California. The boundaries also extend into small portions of Imperial and San Diego counties.

The Coachella Valley Water District relies on three sources of water to provide service to its customers: groundwater, recycled water and imported water either through the State Water Project or from the Colorado River via the Coachella Canal, a branch of the All-American Canal.

== History ==
Farmers were attracted to the Coachella Valley's inexpensive land, year-around growing season and what was initially a plentiful supply of groundwater. They soon realized, however, that the aquifer's water supply was finite and CVWD was voted into existence by Coachella Valley residents and established by the state Legislature on January 9, 1918 with the primary responsibility to protect local water resources. One of the first actions taken by the district was to claim the rights to the Whitewater River (the valley's only source of natural replenishment) to ensure that natural inflows of water to the valley would stay in the valley and benefit the groundwater basin. To better manage the groundwater basin (the only source of water that was then being used for agricultural irrigation) and minimize groundwater pumping, the district looked for alternate sources of water to irrigate agriculturally productive land.

== Areas of services ==
Domestic drinking water. All domestic water comes from the aquifer/groundwater basin beneath the valley floor ranging from Palm Springs to the Salton Sea and has an estimated capacity of 39.2 million acre feet (an acre foot = 325,851 gallons) down to 1,000 feet (300 m) as determined by the U. S. Geological Survey.

Agricultural Irrigation. CVWD receives water from the Colorado River through the 123-mile (198 km) Coachella Branch of the All American Canal. Water in the canal flows entirely by gravity, dropping in elevation an average of one foot per mile. In the Coachella Valley, Colorado River water is used primarily for agricultural irrigation. There are 76,350 acres (30,900 ha) of agricultural land irrigated with Colorado River water. The value of crops irrigated with this water exceeds of $730 million annually. However, some Colorado River water is used for golf course irrigation and groundwater replenishment.

Groundwater Management/Replenishment. CVWD, (in cooperation with Desert Water Agency) operates three groundwater replenishment facilities throughout the valley. State Water Project (SWP) water is percolated at two facilities and Federal Colorado River water is percolated back into the ground at the third. The groundwater management program has been very successful in maintaining the overall health of the aquifer. Replenishment amounts vary from year-to-year depending upon the availability of SWP water.

Wastewater Treatment and Reclamation. The district operates five wastewater/sewage treatment plants. Two of these plants produce highly treated water called tertiary water. Tertiary water has been through three treatment processes and is clean enough for human contact but not human consumption. These five plants collectively receive average daily flows of slightly more than 17 million gallons and have a maximum capacity of 33.5 million gallons. More than 1,100 miles (1,800 km) of below ground sewer pipes bring sewage to the individual plants.

Recycled/Non-potable Water Distribution. Tertiary and other non-potable water (Colorado River water) is sent from the treatment plants and is used for golf course and other green belt irrigation, conserving groundwater pumping.

Conservation. CVWD has a wide variety of conservation programs to promote both indoor and outdoor conservation. Indoor benefits include low flow toilet rebates and free indoor conservation kits. Outdoor programs include turf buy back, smart irrigation controllers and new generation sprinkler nozzle rebates as well as other commercial/industrial programs.

Stormwater protection. The stormwater protection area includes 381,479 acres (154,379 ha) and features 16 stormwater channels that total 134 miles (216 km) of regional flood protection facilities.

Agricultural irrigation drainage. Agricultural drainage is removed from farms through an underground tile drain system that terminates in the Salton Sea. There are nearly 2,300 miles (3,700 km) of on-farms drains that drain more than 37,425 acres (15,145 ha) of producing farmland. The district maintains 21 miles (34 km) of open drains and 166 miles (267 km) of underground pipe.

== Sources of Water ==
Groundwater. The source of drinking water in the Coachella Valley is an aquifer from which groundwater is pumped. CVWD serves a population of nearly 320,000 with a total daily demand of 90.4 million gallons.

The aquifer lies beneath the valley and ranges from Palm Springs on the north western end and terminates under the Salton Sea at the south eastern end. It generally extends between the mountain ranges that run along the northwest to southeast axis. The principal mountain ranges include the Santa Rosa and San Jacinto along the west and the San Bernardino and Little San Bernardino's along the eastern side of the valley.

Colorado River Water. CVWD acquired the right to use water from the Colorado River with the 1931 Seven Parties Agreement. Originally, that right was never quantified and went unchallenged until 2003. In 2003 with the Quantification Settlement Agreement (QSA), CVWD's quantified right to Colorado River Water is 450,000 acre feet. Colorado River Water is used primarily for agricultural irrigation. Colorado River water can also be used to irrigate golf courses and for percolation into the ground to replenish the aquifer.

Recycled Water. Tertiary treated wastewater is used to irrigate some of the valley's golf courses. This saves millions of gallons a year from being pumped out of the groundwater basin. Each year, more courses are added to the system to receive treated wastewater or Colorado River water.

State Water Project Water. CVWD is one of 29 contractors for State Water Project (SWP) water that comes from Northern California to the south. The district, in conjunction with Desert Water Agency, has a combined Table 1 allocation of 194,100 acre-feet of water from the State Water Project which is the third largest allocation after Metropolitan Water District and Kern County Water Agency. Full allocations for SWP water from the State are not always met. This is sometimes due to restrictions on the amount of water that can be pumped from the Delta. Maintenance of Delta habitat and to prevent salinity intrusion from San Francisco Bay, a prescribed flow has to pass through the Delta. In years of low rainfall, the priority for habitat maintenance and salinity control in the Delta are prioritized over exporting water to Southern California.

== Governance ==
CVWD is governed by a five-member Board of Directors (Board) who are elected by the public for 4-year terms from within the 5 Divisions that comprise the district's service area. Terms of office are staggered and elections are held every two years, for two or three of the five Board members.

CVWDs administrative headquarters is located at 75-515 Hovley Lane East in the heart of Palm Desert. Two other operations facilities are located at 75-525 Hovley Lane East in Palm Desert and at 51-501Tyler Street in Coachella, California.
