= Quantification Settlement Agreement =

2003 agreement regarding Colorado River water

The Quantification Settlement Agreement of 2003 is an agreement between the Imperial Irrigation District, the San Diego County Water Authority, and several other federal, local, and state water agencies. Under the terms of the agreement, the Imperial Irrigation District (IID) agreed to transfer large quantities of irrigation water to the San Diego County Water Authority while providing a pathway for the state of California to restore the Salton Sea. According to the IID, "The Quantification Settlement Agreement and Related Agreements are a set of inter-related contracts that settle certain disputes among the United States, the State of California, IID, Metropolitan Water District, Coachella Valley Water District and the San Diego County Water Authority."

The implementation of the agreement has been controversial, as critics have argued that the agreement was passed without proper environmental review. The impact on the surrounding environment has been cited by opponents, who argue that the policies of the agreement are severely damaging the Salton Sea and Colorado River. In addition, a protracted drought affecting the state of California has complicated the debate about effective water control policies. Prior to the agreement, there was comparatively little environmental impact on the ecologically fragile Salton Sea. If upheld by the courts, the conditions will remain in force for up to 75 years.

== Background ==
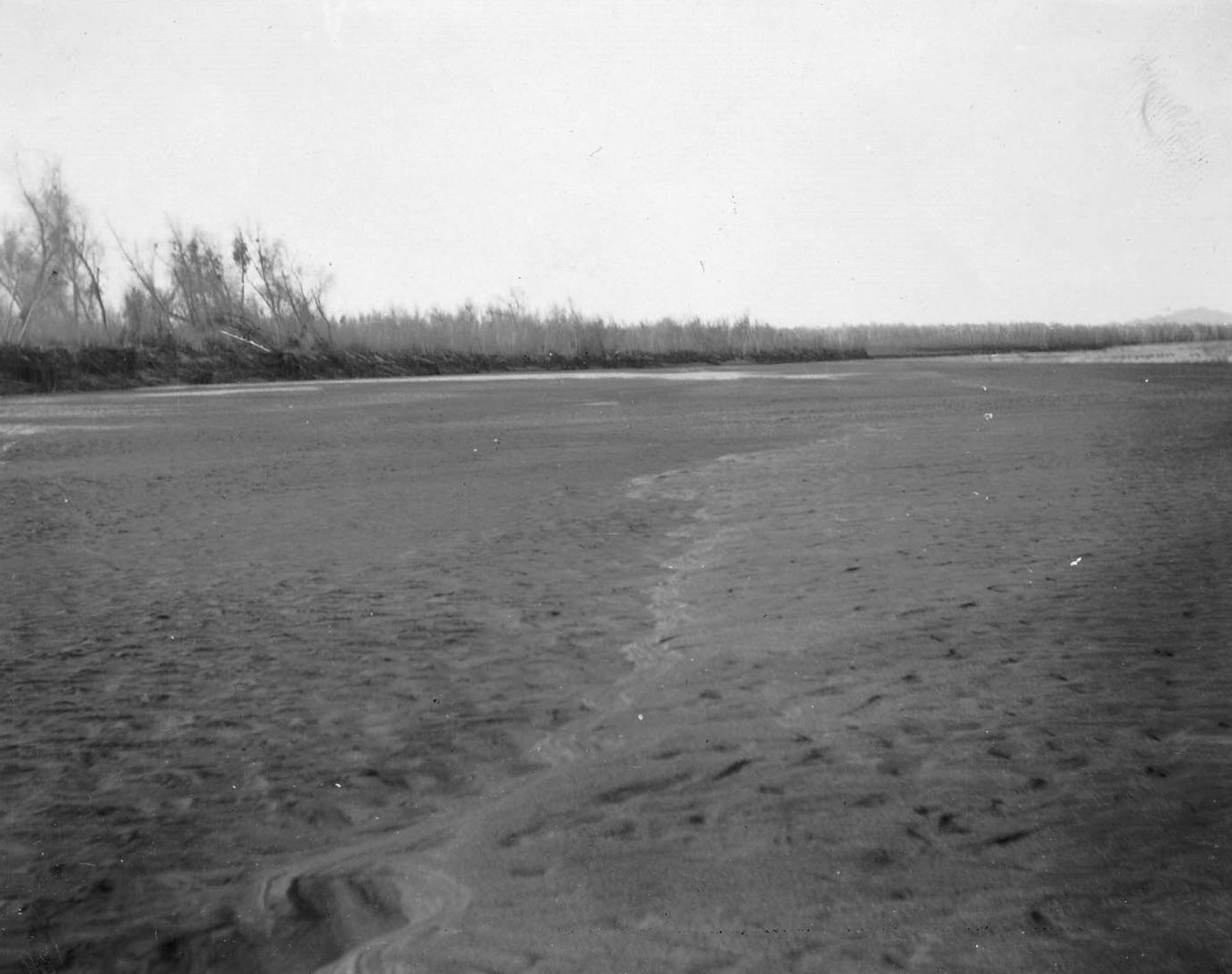
Dry Bed of Colorado River Below Imperial Intake, circa 1905

Starting in 1901, farmers in the Imperial Valley were using the Colorado River for irrigation water, with drainage water going to a very small Salton Sea. The surrounding ecosystem changed somewhat rapidly, and "by 1929, the combination of evaporation and agricultural drainage water increased the Sea's salinity, eliminating most of the fresh water fish species." In addition to fish, migratory birds have long inhabited the region, and there is concern that pollutants are damaging the population. Most notably, "salt, selenium and pesticides are carried into the sea with agricultural return flows, which originates largely from Imperial Valley farms."

With the post-World War II population growth in Southern California, there has been an increasing demand for water sources to supply both urban and existing agricultural areas. The Colorado River currently supplies approximately a quarter of the water for these areas. Along with increased water demand, a protracted drought throughout the state has complicated the debate about effective water control and usage policies.

In 2003, California suffered from an extended drought, and there was considerable discussion and debate about how much water each water district was entitled to receive from the Colorado River and its tributaries. As a result, several organizations negotiated an agreement for water rights for their associated districts: the San Diego County Water Authority, the Coachella Valley Water District, the Imperial Irrigation District, the Metropolitan Water District of Southern California, and the U.S. Department of the Interior. The agreement was a compromise that divided available water resources between the environmentally fragile Imperial Valley and the more heavily populated areas of Southern California.

Among California agricultural regions, the Imperial Valley uses a substantial portion of the Colorado River water that is allotted to the state each year. Approximately 3.1 million of the 4.4 million acre feet of water the state receives annually from the Colorado River is used by the Imperial Irrigation District. According to the Imperial Irrigation District, "As a result of the QSA, California can creatively stretch its limited Colorado River resource by allowing urban areas to fund water conservation efforts in the Imperial Valley in exchange for use of the conserved water."

Much attention has been paid to the impact of the Quantification Settlement Agreement on the Salton Sea, and Wired Magazine notes that "Considered to be among the world's most vital avian habitats and-until recently-one of its most productive fisheries, the Salton Sea is in a state of wild flux." At one time a thriving ecosystem formed following an irrigation accident in 1905, the Salton Sea has increasingly faced higher levels of salinity in addition to shrinking water volume. The Quantification Settlement Agreement intended to provide a pathway for restoring this ecosystem.

In addition to the purported environmental benefits, the Quantification Settlement Agreement is of particular importance to the Imperial Valley region due to the economic conditions of the area. In a recent article for the New Yorker, Dana Goodyear noted that "The deal gives Imperial billions of dollars to spend on improving efficiency on its farms and its irrigation infrastructure, which in some parts is primitive." Some potential improvements to this system include the installation of improved pumping systems and more durable canal infrastructure.

== Implementation ==
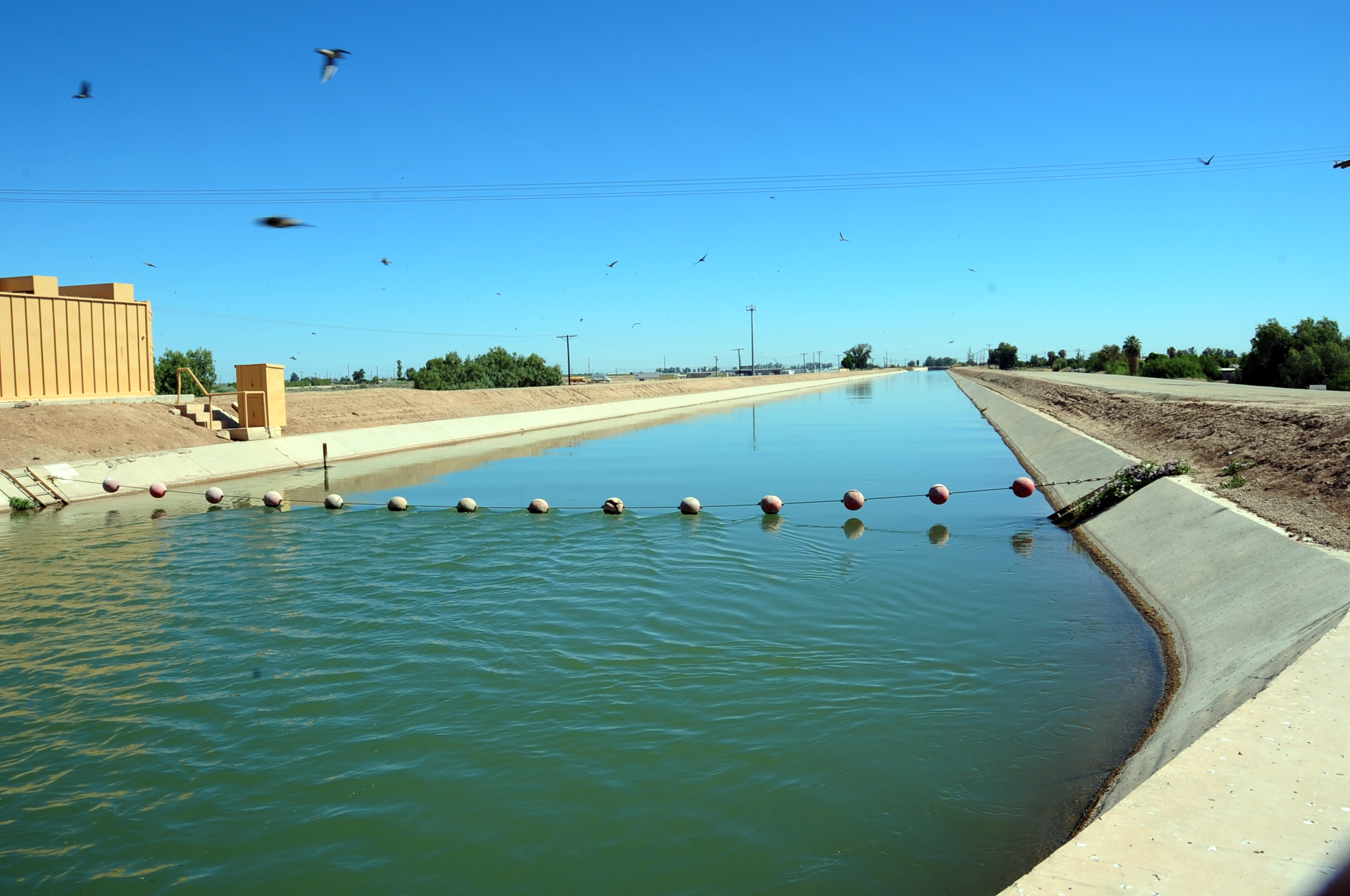
The All-American Canal lining project was completed in April 2010 as part of the QSA conservation efforts.

Although the agreement went into effect in 2003, it was almost immediately challenged by groups of local farmers and environmentalists. Despite these challenges, the water transfers outlined in the agreement started on time and canal lining conservation projects have been completed. The Coachella Canal lining project was completed in 2006, and the All-American Canal lining project finished in 2010, conserving 93,700 acre-feet of water per year. While those conservation numbers are important to the agreement, the total amount of water transferred to the water authorities is set to increase significantly in 2018.

The Imperial Irrigation District faced significant criticism in 2012 when it was reported that it was not conserving as much water as stipulated under the Quantification Settlement Agreement. The Imperial Irrigation District is required to deliver its water quota through conservation, rather than delivery from existing sources. Some have noted that this would be difficult for a rural region that depends heavily on water for irrigation purposes. One of the most comprehensive summaries of the implementation process has been written by the Colorado Foundation for Water Education. They note that "The first benchmark, set for December 31, 2002, required the California water agencies to enter into a Quantification Settlement Agreement." The same group notes that the Secretary of the Interior determined in July 2003 that the Imperial Irrigation District, which also has authority over the water supply for the Salton Sea, was wasting 300,000 acre-feet of water per year and threatened to remove that allotment without compensation under the QSA.

The agreement has been associated with a large degree of litigation, with numerous parties and organizations filing motions in California state courts. As of December 8, 2011, the California Court of Appeal for the Third District has ruled in favor of the major state and federal water authorities, and determined that the Quantification Settlement Agreement does not violate the California Constitution. Opponents also argued that the Agreement violated the state's Clean Air Act, but this claim was rejected as well. In July 2013, the Sacramento Superior Court entered a final judgment upholding the agreement and dismissing all current challenges, but the San Diego County Water Authority still anticipates another round of appeals.

== Supporters ==
Most of the support for the Quantification Settlement Agreement has been associated with government agencies, on both the state and federal level. Numerous government agencies produced press releases that touted the benefits of the agreement. Many of these releases noted that this was the largest water transfer agreement in American history. Although residents of the Imperial Valley have been the main opponents of this measure, some observers have embraced the agreement, arguing that it is the most realistic and pragmatic solution to the water crisis in the area. Brad Jennings, a tentative supporter of the agreement, notes that "There are things most agree on: The Salton Sea must be saved. No matter how you feel about water transfers you know that a dead Sea would be an environmental disaster for us. And our water rights and water allotment must be protected. That means we may have to give some up, which is what the QSA was designed to do." He also argued that the measure would likely prevent federal intervention, a concern of many residents of the Imperial Valley.

In addition, the Colorado Foundation for Water Education, an educational and professional development organization, has written positively about the agreement. In an article, Jim Lochhead notes that "By forcing California to live within its means, the QSA provides reassurance that our ability to develop water in the Colorado River Basin is for the time being, secure." The CFWE is based in Denver and has a different perspective of the QSA due to the importance of the Colorado River outside of California. There has been significant discussion about the human impact on water supplies in California, with criticism of the unrestrained population growth particularly in Southern California.

The State of California has connected the Quantification Settlement Agreement to the Salton Sea crisis, and has attempted to highlight the planned environmental restoration benefits of the compact. According to the California Department of Water Resources, the major elements of the Salton Sea Restoration Plan include: water management infrastructure, habitat restoration, water quality management, and air quality management.

== Opponents ==
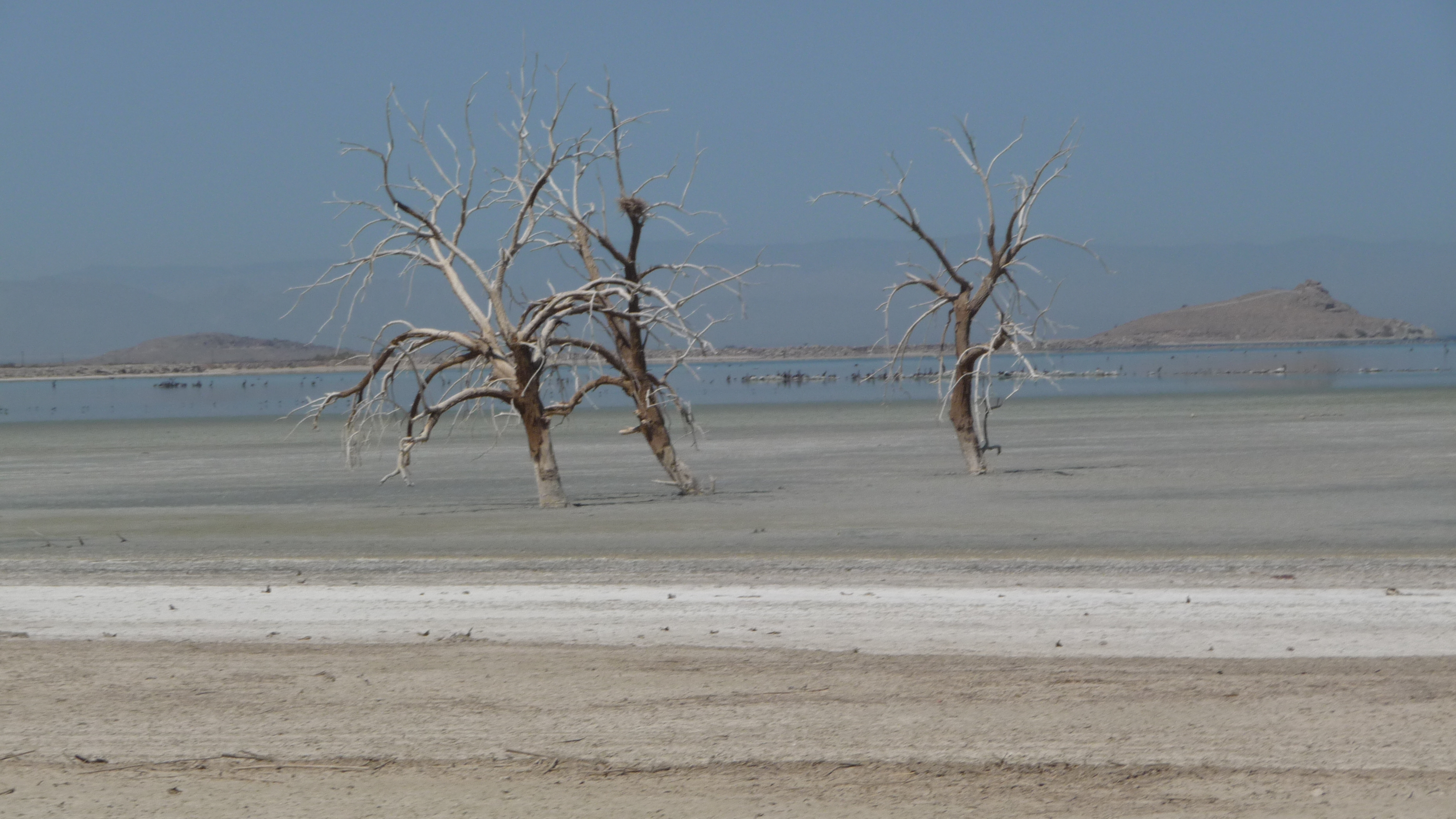
Drowned trees in the dry bed of the Salton Sea

Opposition to the agreement has been centered with two main groups: Protect Our Water and Environmental Rights (POWER), an environmental organization, and local farmers from the Imperial Valley. POWER has argued for traditional methods of water conservation, such as reuse and recycling in urban areas in place of a transfer of water from the Salton Sea. The salinity of the lake has increased substantially, and conservationists argue that this has damaged the surrounding ecosystem. Restoration efforts have been championed by local politicians, as the Salton Sea is prominent for being the largest man-made lake in California.

Along with environmentalists and farmers, local journalists have noted the negative effects that the QSA may have on the communities in the Salton Sea vicinity. In an article in the Desert Sun, Colt Stewart notes that "We are told the price to manage the death or shrinking of the sea is too high. Estimates range from $3 billion to $9 billion." Stewart compared this to the much larger $60 billion high speed rail project the state has approved, and is critical of the government's priorities. He also argues that "we can't solve this problem with tired old thinking based on the concept of a virtually free and seemingly limitless supply of clean, fresh surface and ground water", tying the QSA to the larger water shortage crisis the state faces.

Other opposition arguments include poor conduct of the parties involved in litigation and the seeming lack of commitment to restoring the Salton Sea. Elizabeth Varen, in an article for the Imperial Valley Press, noted that Judge Ronald B. Robie refused to recuse himself as the environmental group POWER fought the QSA in court. Other media outlets have voiced their opposition as well. Wired Magazine asserts that "the deal allots virtually no water to the Salton Sea" and also notes that efforts to deliver mitigation water have been impeded.

== Future ==
While the current round of legal questions have been settled in the courts, controversy about the effects of the agreement has increased in 2015. The Coachella Valley Water District and the Imperial Irrigation District have disputed a petition filed by the latter organization that calls for the state and other authorities to restore the ecological stability of the Salton Sea. As of April 2015, a state task force has agreed to examine the petition and potentially respond to the ecological concerns cited. An envoy from the Imperial Irrigation District is discussing the petition with the state government, as there have been concerns that the state's promises to assist the IID in providing mitigation water to the Salton Sea region have been vague and unfulfilled. The QSA required the state to identify a Salton Sea restoration plan and include funding, though nothing has yet been approved. Imperial Irrigation District officials have asserted that they would never have agreed to the QSA without assistance from other government agencies.

In an article dating from January 2015, the local Desert Sun newspaper noted that the decrease in water provided to the Imperial Valley from the Colorado River "will leave growing stretches of lakebed exposed to the desert winds, sending more dust wafting through an area that already has high rates of asthma and other respiratory illnesses."

== 2015 California water crisis ==
The Quantification Settlement Agreement and the Salton Sea restoration have increasingly been discussed within the larger framework of the California water crisis in 2015. The use of water for agricultural purposes has been discussed and debated, as approximately 80% of all California water use can be attributed to agricultural needs, most notably in the Central Valley and the rural areas of Imperial County. However, there are indications that Californians are aware of this crisis, and water scientist Jay Famligietti wrote in an opinion piece that "A recent Field Poll showed that 94% of Californians surveyed believe that the drought is serious, and that one-third support mandatory rationing." Reflecting these concerns, California Governor Jerry Brown announced new restrictions on water use in the state in 2015. These restrictions, delivered in an executive order, "directed the State Water Resources Control Board to impose a 25% reduction on the state's 400 local water supply agencies, which serve 90% of all California residents, over the coming year." It remains to be seen how this will affect the Quantification Settlement Agreement, as well as the environmental future of the Salton Sea.
