= Salton Sink =

Geographic sink in California

- Endorheic basin
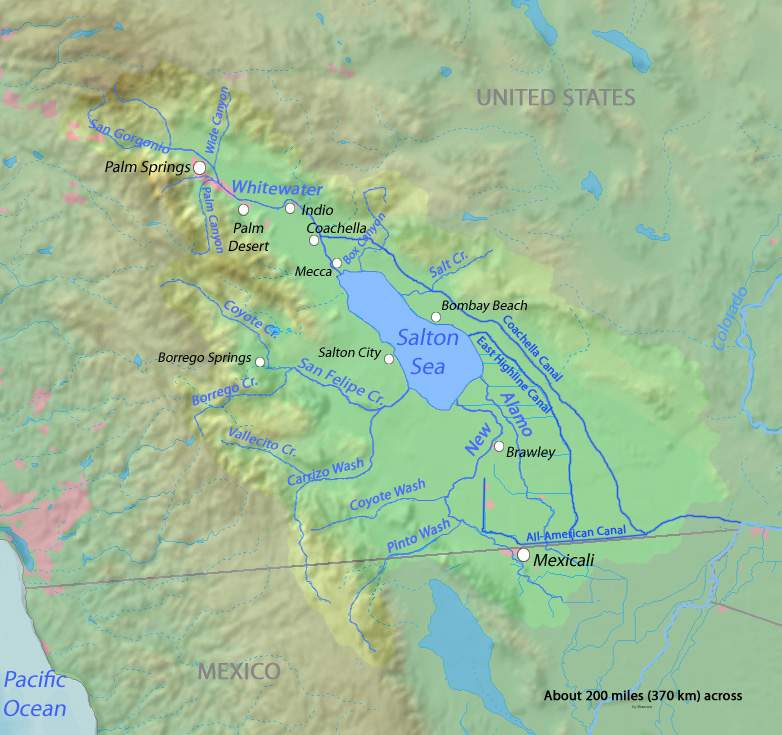
- The Salton Sink is part of the Salton Watershed (light green area).
- Interactive map of Salton Sink
- Coordinates: 33.3334°N 115.8342°W
- Location: California, United States

The Salton Sink is the low point of an endorheic basin, a closed drainage system with no outflows to other bodies of water, in the Colorado Desert sub-region of the Sonoran Desert. The sink falls within the larger Salton Trough and separates the Coachella Valley from the Imperial Valley, which are also segments of the Salton Trough. The lowest point of the sink is 269 ft (82 m) below sea level, and since 1906 the 343-square-mile (890 km^{2}) Salton Sea has filled the lowest portion of the sink to a water depth of up to 43 ft (13 m).

== Geology ==
The Salton Sink is the topographic low area within the Salton Trough, an active tectonic pull-apart basin. The Salton Trough is a result of crustal stretching and sinking by the combined actions of the San Andreas Fault and the East Pacific Rise. The Brawley seismic zone forms the southeast end of the basin and connects the San Andreas Fault system with the Imperial Fault Zone to the south. The Salton Buttes are rhyolite lava domes within the basin which were active 10,300 (± 1000) years BP.

== History ==
A large lake, Lake Cahuilla, existed in the area from about 20,500 to 3,000 years ago and left evidence as wave-cut benches on the higher portions of the Salton Buttes. A beach mark outlines the shoreline of ancient Lake Cahuilla where archeologists found rock fish traps and charred remains of razorback sucker and bonytail bones. High water lines suggest the basin has filled many times, creating a lake some 105 mi (169 km) in length and nearly 300 ft (91 m) deep. Its most recent incarnation is evidenced by fish traps found some 30 ft (9.1 m) below the high-water mark that were estimated to be between 300 and 1,000 years old.

In recent times, the 1862 Colorado River flood waters reached the Salton Sink, filling it and creating a lake some 60 mi (97 km) long and 30 mi (48 km) wide. In 1884 and 1891 the Colorado River had escapement flow into the Salton Sink. The 1891 flood created a lake that covered an area 30 mi (48 km) long and 10 mi (16 km) wide. A larger 1905 Colorado flood escaped into a diversion canal, forming the Alamo and New Rivers and creating the current Salton Sea in the sink's Coachella Valley. A 1907 dam prevents flood escapements, but leakage still occurs to the Salton Sea.

== View ==
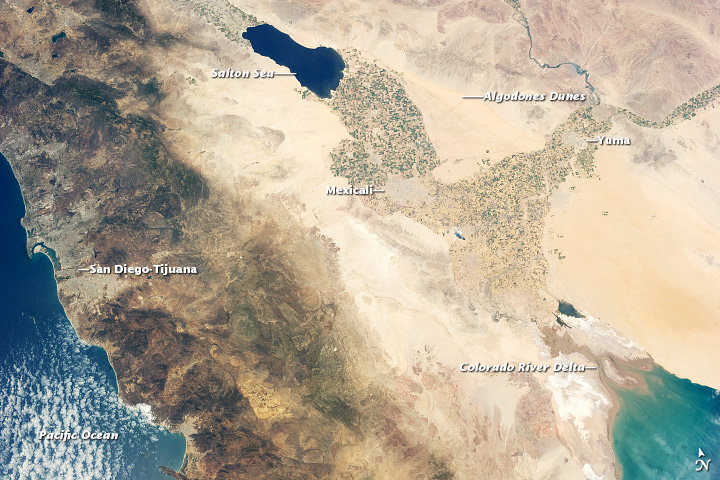
The Salton Trough region from orbit.
