= Alamo River =

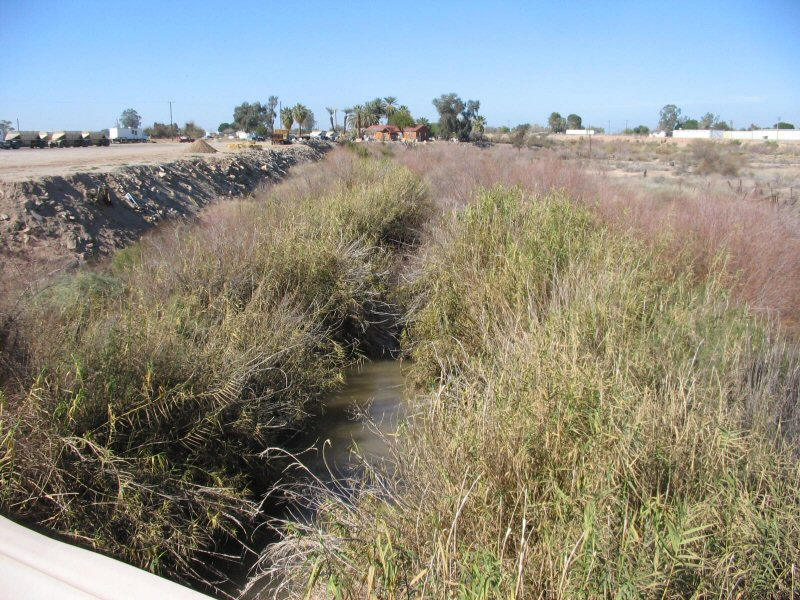
- Alamo River north of Zenos Road, near Holtville, California

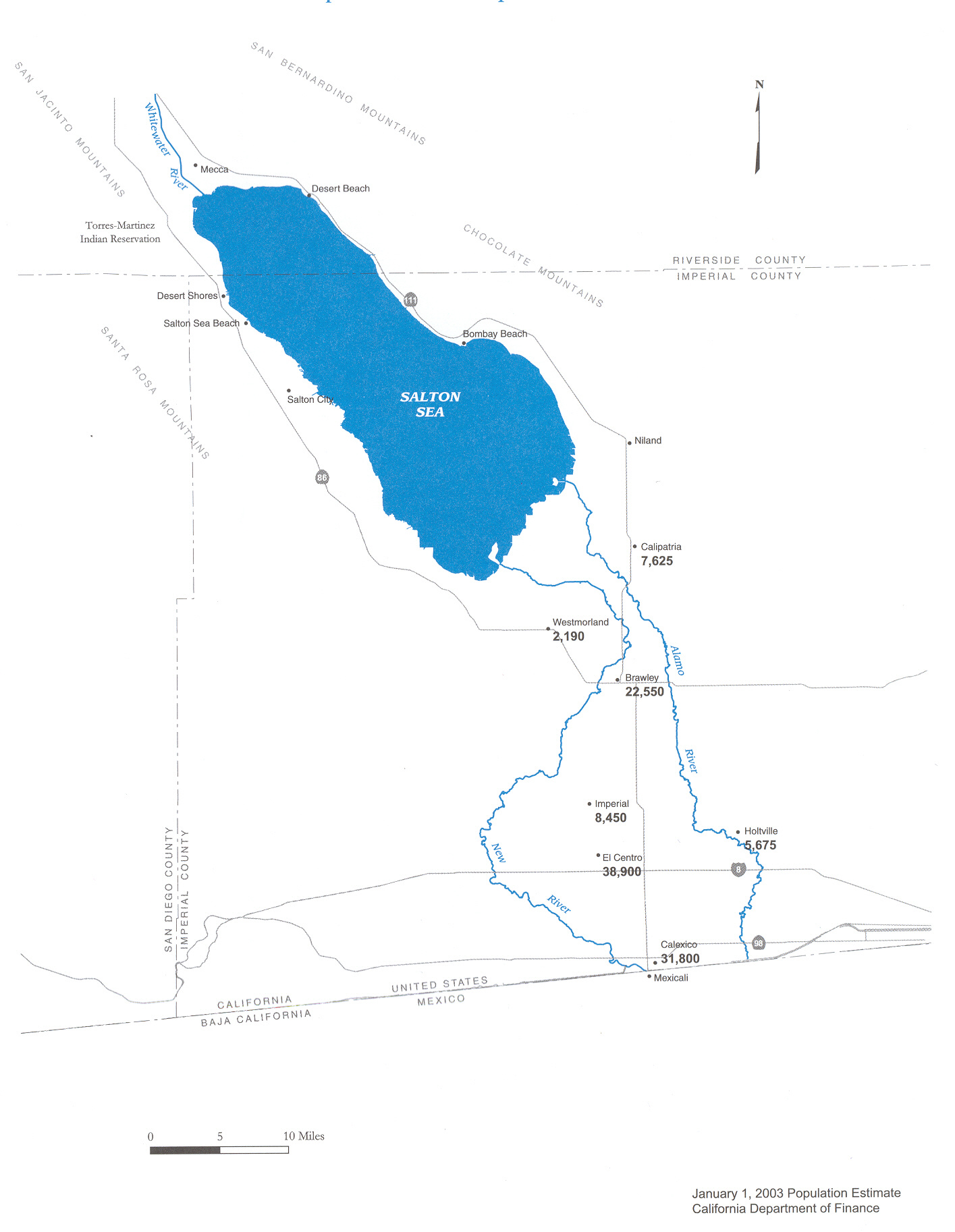
- Map showing the course of the Alamo River in the United States
- Native name: Río Álamo (Spanish)

Location
- Country: Mexico, United States

Physical characteristics
- Source: Colorado River
  - location: Alamo, Baja California, Mexico
  - coordinates: 32.68269°N 114.7515656°W
  - elevation: 36 m (118 ft)
- Mouth: Salton Sea
  - coordinates: 33.206517°N 115.61433°W
  - elevation: −66 m (−217 ft)
- Length: 52 mi (84 km)
- Discharge
  - location: Niland, about 1 mile (1.6 km) above the mouth
  - average: 847 cu ft/s (24.0 m^{3}/s)
  - minimum: 288 cu ft/s (8.2 m^{3}/s)
  - maximum: 4,500 cu ft/s (130 m^{3}/s)

The Alamo River (Spanish: Río Álamo) is a 52-mile-long (84 km) river that flows west and north from the Mexicali Valley (Baja California) across the Imperial Valley (California) and drains into the Salton Sea.

The New River, Alamo River, and the Salton Sea of the 21st century were created in autumn 1904, when the Colorado River, swollen by seasonal rainfall and snow-melt, flowed through a series of three human-engineered openings in the recently constructed levee bank of the Alamo Canal. The resulting flood poured down the canal and breached an Imperial Valley dike. The sudden influx of water and the lack of any drainage from the basin resulted in the formation of the Salton Sea; the rivers had re-created a great inland sea in an area that it had frequently inundated before, the Salton Sink.

It took almost two years (March 1905 to February 10, 1907) to control the Colorado River's inflow to the Alamo Canal and stop the uncontrolled flooding of the Salton Sink, but the canal was effectively channelized with operational headgates by early 1907. The Alamo and New Rivers continued to flow, but at a lesser rate.

The river was named after the Spanish name for the Fremont cottonwood that grows in the region.

In most places, the river is a vegetation-choked ravine with a small watercourse at the bottom.

The California Office of Environmental Health Hazard Assessment has issued a safe eating advisory based on mercury, DDTs, PCBs, and selenium.

== See also ==
- Lake Cahuilla
- Tributaries of the Salton Sea
