= Coachella Canal =

Aqueduct in California, US

Coordinates: 33°20′09″N 115°33′05″W

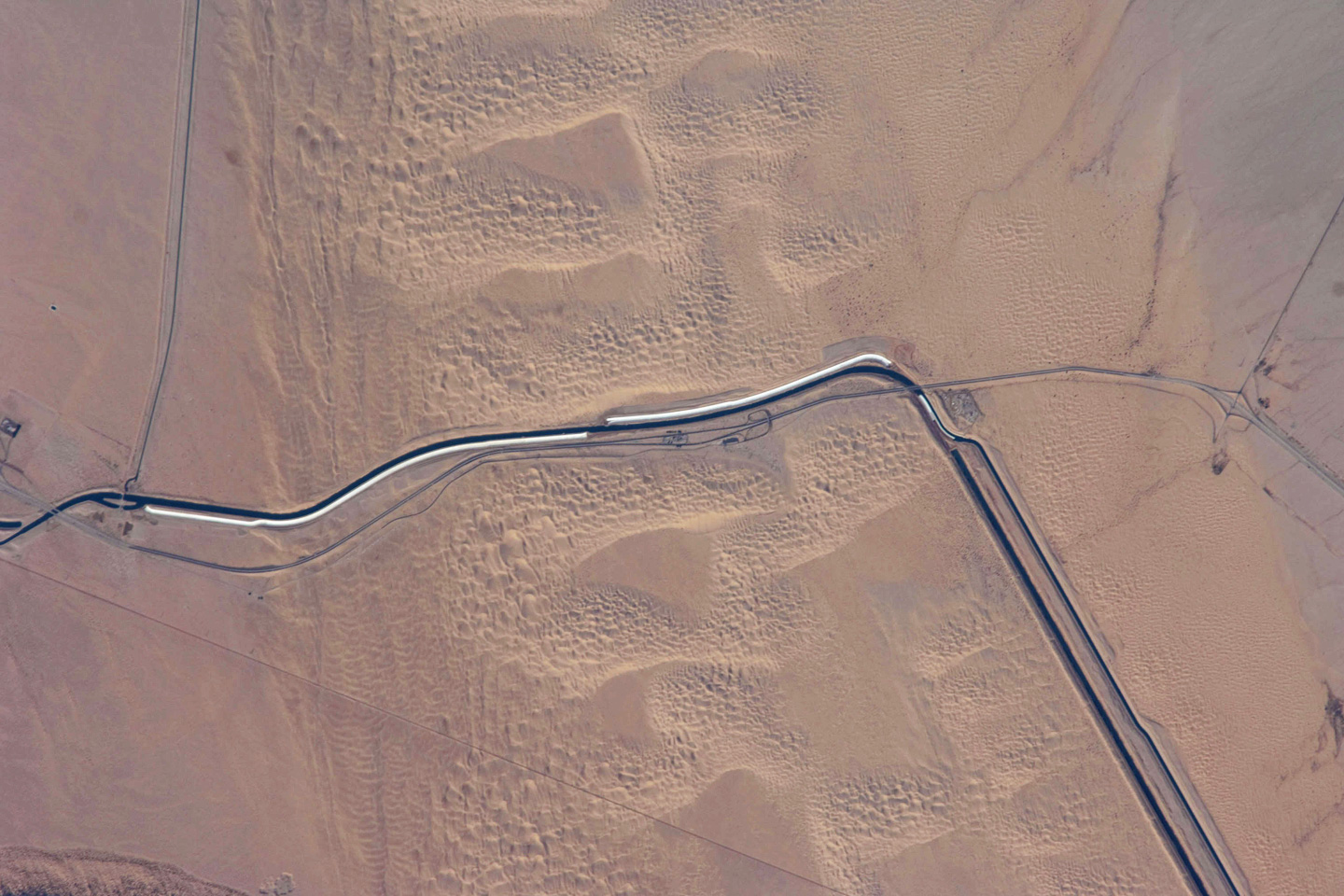
View of the Coachella Canal (upper-left of image) just west of Yuma, Arizona. Note: North is to upper-right.

The Coachella Canal is a 122-mile (196 km) aqueduct that conveys Colorado River water for irrigation northwest from the All-American Canal to the Coachella Valley north of the Salton Sea in Riverside County, California.

The canal was completed in 1949 and is currently operated by the Coachella Valley Water District.

Construction of the Coachella Canal began in the 1930s by the Six Companies, Inc., but was interrupted by World War II. After the war, work was resumed on the canal and deliveries of water began in the late 1940s.

The canal was mostly earth-lined when it was first constructed, except for the last 38 miles, which were concrete-lined. Today, most of the canal is lined with concrete to prevent water loss from seepage. Grass eating fish are stocked in the canal to prevent water loss to aquatic vegetation.

== See also ==
- All-American Canal
- All-American Canal Bridge
- Alamo Canal
- Imperial Irrigation District
- Imperial Land Company
- California Development Company
- Imperial Valley
- Lake Cahuilla (reservoir)
