= List of dams of the LCRV =

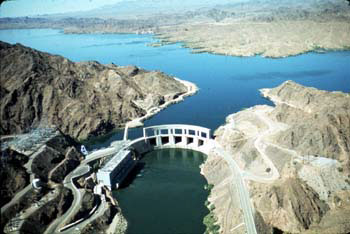
Parker Dam in the Lower Colorado River Valley.

This is a list of dams of the Lower Colorado River Valley in the United States. There are many smaller dams, check dams, or diversion dams, that lace the length of the Colorado River. The major Davis Dam directly downstream of Hoover Dam has the purpose of re-regulating Hoover Dam releases.

The many lakes of the LCRV, the Lower Colorado River Valley, provide great opportunities for birdwatching, as well as a proximity to other riparian birdwatching habitats.

== Major dams ==
- Davis Dam
- Parker Dam–The Colorado River Aqueduct exits W to Los Angeles.
- Imperial Dam: the majority of the Colorado River exits as the All-American Canal, going to the Imperial Valley in the Calif. desert: Colorado Desert.
- Laguna Diversion Dam
- Morelos Dam

== List of dams--North to South ==
- Davis Dam
- Parker Dam
- Headgate Rock Dam//Headgate Dam (Moovalya Lake (Muuvaly in Mojave))- at Earp, Calif/Parker
- Palo Verde Dam–(no lake – diversion dam) – 4 mi N Ehrenberg/Blythe
- Imperial Dam
- Laguna Diversion Dam
- Morelos Dam–(no lake)
