= Charles Robinson Rockwood =

American surveyor and engineer

- Charles Robinson Rockwood (Note: Unknown Photographer, "Charles Robinson Rockwood". Photographic Print from The History of Imperial County California by Finnis C. Farr p. 96.5, 1918. Google Books, Charles Robinson Rockwood.)
- Born: May 14, 1860; Flint, Michigan, US
- Died: March 3, 1922 (aged 61); Los Angeles, California, US
- Education: University of Michigan
- Occupations: Civil engineering and surveying
- Employer(s): United States Geological Survey, California Development Company, Southern Pacific Railroad, Imperial Irrigation District
- Known for: Flooding of the Salton Sink and creation of the Salton Sea
- Notable work: Alamo Canal
- Political party: Republican
- Spouses: Katherine Davenport (divorced); Mildred Cassin (m. 1906)
- Children: 1

Charles Robinson Rockwood (May 14, 1860 - March 3, 1922) was a United States (U.S.) civil engineer, and entrepreneur. His career was in various states of the United States, particularly in the state of California. His most significant achievement was managing the construction of a canal system that transformed the Colorado Desert in southern California into a verdant agricultural development known as the Imperial Valley. He is also infamous for directing modifications to that same canal system which led to the accidental creation of the Salton Sea in southern California.

== Early life ==
Charles R. Rockwood grew up in the U.S., working on his parents' farm, near Flint, Michigan. Both parents were of Puritan descent. His mother was a direct descendant of John Robinson, one of the organizers of the Mayflower expedition which established the Plymouth Colony in Massachusetts prior to the founding of the U.S.

From a very young age, Rockwood desired a good education. In 1878 he graduated at the top of his high school class. Immediately after graduation, he enrolled at the University of Michigan in an engineering program. Unfortunately, problems with his vision forced him to drop out. He intended to return to school and complete his degree but never did.

== Early career ==
After departing the university he began working as a surveyor in various U.S. states, starting in Denver for the Rio Grande Railway in the state of Colorado. Over the course of the next few years he worked for several railroad companies in the capacity of a civil engineer. In 1889 he returned to survey work as an employee of the United States Geological Survey. A year later he became the chief engineer of an irrigation project in the state of Washington. In 1892 he quit the position and moved to California. There he did survey work in Sonora, California and the state's Colorado Desert, confirming the potential of irrigating those lands for farming.

A favorable report from Rockwood on irrigating the Colorado Desert prompted his employer to create a subsidiary company named the Colorado River Irrigation Company. This company was tasked with creating a canal system that could deliver water from the Colorado River into the Colorado Desert for agricultural use. Because of the financial panic of 1893, the company failed before canal construction began.

== California Development Company and the Alamo Canal ==
In 1895 Rockwood began promoting the irrigation project himself, eventually forming the California Development Company (CDC). It took several more years of effort to raise funding for the project. In March 1900, George Chaffey, known for several other successful irrigation projects, joined the CDC as an investor and engineer. Under Mr. Chaffey's direction, construction began on the first section of what would be known as the Alamo Canal (also known as the Imperial Canal) during December 1900. The canal was designed to bring water from the Colorado River to the soon to be named Imperial Valley for agricultural irrigation.

== Connection with the Salton Sea ==
Map showing location of various channels (headings) in 1904. (Note: Modified illustration by George Kennan, "Map showing location of various channels (headings) in 1904, based on illustration by George Kennan". Modified Illustration from The Salton Sea - An Accounting of Harriman's Fight with the Colorado River by George Kennan p.34, 2017. Google Books, The Three Headings (or Intakes), in Spring of 1905.)

During the first couple years of operation, silt deposits built up in the upper section of the Alamo Canal reducing the amount of water it could deliver to the Imperial Valley. The lack of water caused great discontent among farmers and did significant harm to the ever expanding agriculture endeavors in the valley. In order to maintain adequate water supplies for farming, Rockwood was forced to dig additional channels to increase the water flow.

In September 1904 Rockwood directed his engineers and workers to dig the largest of these new channels, bypassing the silt clogged section of the canal. The new channel was built without control infrastructure to manage the water flow because of delays in getting permits. The new channel solved the water flow problem, making water plentiful for all of the farms in the Imperial Valley. It also created a new problem. Since there was no method to control water flow, oftentimes the amount of water delivered to the Imperial Valley was far in excess of what could be used by farmers. The unused water was allowed to flow into the Salton Sink. This marked the birth of the modern Salton Sea.

The first few months of 1905 saw several large floods from the Colorado River deepen and widen the bypass channel. Initially, Rockwood was not worried about the increased water supply and saw no need to stem the flow. Later that year fall and winter flooding of the river made the opening of the channel even wider. This caused the river to shift its course. Instead of following its usual course to the Gulf of California, the entire volume of the Colorado River flowed into the canal system and onto the Imperial Valley and Salton Sink. For almost two years the river ran unchecked into the Salton Sink, creating the Salton Sea. Many attempts were made to stop the flooding, but they all failed. Finally in early 1907, with help from Edward H. Harriman of the Southern Pacific Railroad, the uncontrolled flooding was stopped.

== Later career ==
In April 1906 Rockwood resigned his position as assistant manager at the CDC and became a consulting engineer for the same company. Later that year, just before the flooding of the Salton Sink was halted, he severed his ties with the CDC and moved within California to Los Angeles. From 1906 to 1909 he worked with several different companies on various development projects in the Imperial Valley. During this time he also attempted to win compensation for assets of the CDC that the Southern Pacific Railroad had taken control of. He was not successful in his endeavors against the railroad. After 1909 Rockwood relocated to the Santa Maria Valley and oversaw the construction of several railways. In November 1914 he returned to the Imperial Valley and served as the chief engineer and general manager of the newly formed Imperial Irrigation District until 1919.

== Achievements, recognition, and criticisms ==
Rockwood has been referred to as the father of the Imperial Valley. The efforts he made in creating a canal system to bring water to the Colorado Desert turned the region into productive farmland. His name is ensconced on streets, parks, structures, and other locations around the Salton Sea and Imperial Valley in recognition of his contributions.

Several history books blame Rockwood for the flooding that occurred in the Salton Sink from 1905 to 1907. Some authors even go so far as to declare his actions criminal. While his actions did lead to the accidental flooding of the Salton Sink and creation of the Salton Sea, he made those decisions to preserve the existence of the farms in the Imperial Valley. His efforts to save the valley from drought would never have been necessary if the man in charge of construction for the Alamo Canal, George Chaffey, had followed the original plans. Chaffey changed the route of the canal, modified its design, and improperly constructed a headgate at Pilot Knob, California. If not for all of the mistakes made by Chaffey, Rockwood would never have been forced to dig the channel that led to the flooding and creation of the Salton Sea.

== Reality of the flooding in the Salton Sink and Imperial Valley ==
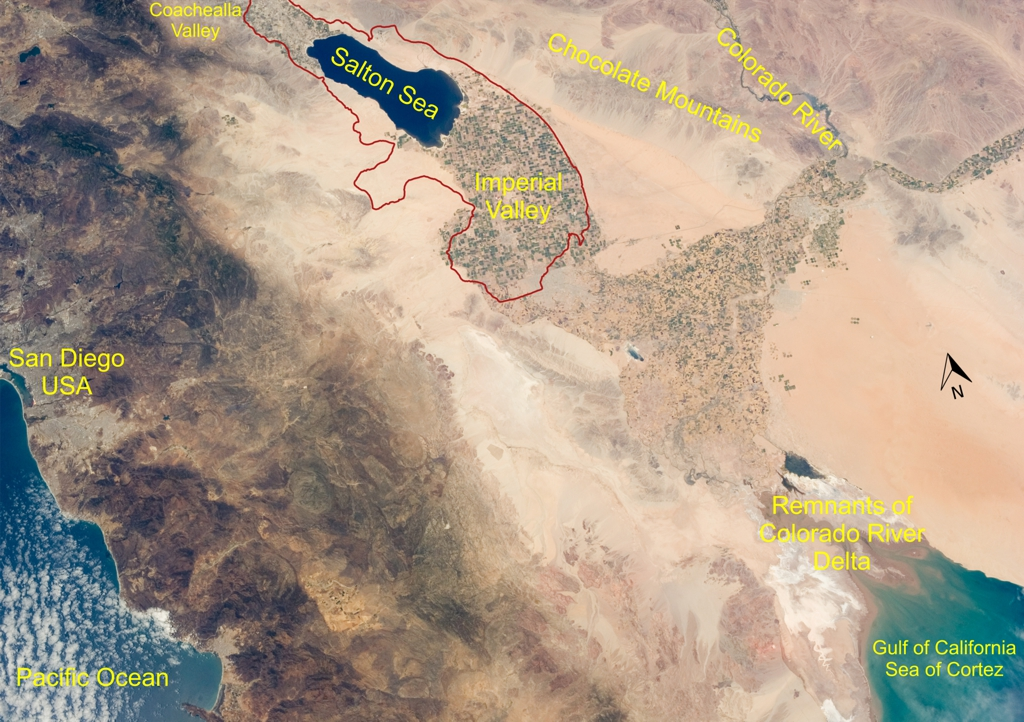
An aerial view of the Salton Sea and surrounding regions. The red outline indicates the approximate size the sea would have reached if the Colorado River had been allowed to completely fill it. (Note: Photograph by NASA from International Space Station, "Salton Sea and Southern California with Labels". Electronic Photograph, June 21, 2013. NASA, Salton Trough.)

During the flooding of the Salton Sea many newspapers focused on the threat it represented to the Imperial Valley. Many stories that were published exaggerated the extent of the flood danger. Charts that tracked the rising level of the sea were included with these stories, furthering the narrative that farms were in danger of being flooded. These stories were false. It can be considered understandable at the time, given they did not have historical perspective. While certain businesses like the New Liverpool Salt works and Southern Pacific Railroad suffered damages resulting from the flooding, the vast majority farms that existed at the time were not in any imminent danger.

Based on the volume of the Salton Sink, in California's Coachella Valley and Imperial Valley it would take approximately 700 cubic miles of water to fill the entire basin up to sea level. Given the average flow volume of the Colorado River is about 14 cubic miles per year, it would take a long time to completely flood. When absorption and evaporation are accounted for, it would require almost a century to completely flood the region. Unknown at the time, the construction of Boulder Dam (later renamed Hoover Dam) would have arrested the flow of the river long before any flood waters reached the majority of farms that existed at that time.

== Personal life and death ==
Rockwood was married twice. His first wife was Katherine Davenport of Vacaville, California. They had one daughter, Estelle, who was born in 1888. His second marriage was to Mildred Cassin of Saint John, New Brunswick, Canada. He died on March 3, 1922, at his home in Los Angeles at age 62.

== See also ==
- Salton Sea
- Alamo Canal
- Colorado River Irrigation Company
- California Development Company
- Colorado River
- Colorado Desert
- Imperial Valley
- Salton Sink
- Calexico, California
- Imperial Irrigation District
- George Chaffey

== Sources ==
- Life of the Salton Sea
- Calisphere - University of California
- Calexico Chronicle
- Imperial Valley Press
- Imperial Irrigation District
- Popular Science: Science, Space and New Technology
- United States Geological Survey
- Calexico Recreation Department
