= Colorado River Irrigation Company =

The Colorado River Irrigation Company was incorporated in Colorado on January 7, 1892, for the purpose of irrigating "lands contiguous to the Colorado River." The company founders claimed to be able to irrigate 3,000,000 acres (12,000 km^{2}), with 1,000,000 acres (4,000 km^{2}) of that being in San Diego County, California, and the remainder in Baja California, Mexico. They projected that the canal would be completed within two years. The Colorado River was described as an "inexhaustible source."

The company employed C. R. Rockwood as an engineer. Rockwood was aware of O. M. Wozencraft's earlier attempts to promote a scheme to irrigate the Salton Sink.

The 1893 depression impacted capital flow to the company. The company failed in September, 1894, with the director, John. C. Beatty, accused of fraud.

In 1894 Rockwood sued the company for outstanding salary and was awarded the data he had collected as well as engineering equipment. Rockwood and Anthony H. Heber later formed the California Development Company and, with George Chaffey providing capital, this new company constructed a canal system to divert Colorado River water to the Salton Sink.

== See also ==
- Alamo Canal
- Imperial Irrigation District
- Imperial Land Company
- Salton Sea
