= Yuma Project =

U.S. Bureau of Reclamation project

Coordinates: 32°49′39″N 114°30′0″W

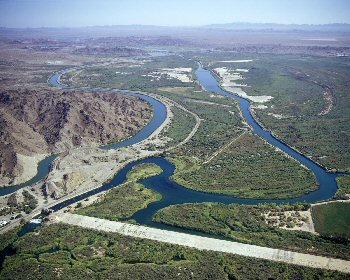
Laguna Diversion Dam

The Yuma Project is a U.S. Bureau of Reclamation project built to irrigate over 68,000 acres (280 km^{2}) of land in Yuma County, Arizona and parts of Imperial County, California. The project is designed to exploit year-round farming conditions and water from the Colorado River. It consists of the Laguna Diversion Dam, pumping plants, a power plant, a 53-mile (85 km) system of canals, 218 miles (351 km) of lateral canals, levees and drains. The project began in 1903 and the majority of the work was completed by 1915. It was the first dam and reclamation project on the Colorado River and workers had to overcome many natural and logistical obstacles to build and maintain it. The Laguna Diversion Dam was replaced by the Imperial Dam as the Project's water source between 1941 and 1948. Today, it serves 275 farms and over 94,000 people.

== Background and layout ==
Although temperatures in the southern areas of Arizona and California tend to be hot and precipitation averages 3.5 inches (89 mm) a year, the region features a year-round farming season and the Colorado River. The Bureau of Reclamation and the Yuma County Water Users' Association wanted to exploit these conditions and create a large area of irrigation-fed farming. The project would be split into two divisions, the Valley Division in Yuma County, Arizona and the Reservation Division in Imperial County, California. The Reservation Division was further broken down into the Bard Unit and the Indian Unit. The Reservation Division and Bard Unit occupy much of what was Fort Yuma Indian Reservation.

== History and construction ==
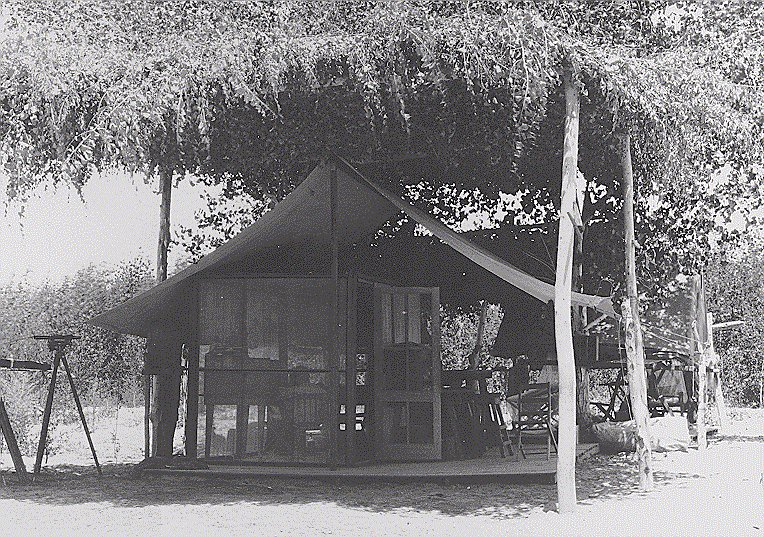
Yuma Project construction office

In 1854, the United States purchased the future Yuma Project's land in the Gasden Purchase but had created the Fort Yuma Indian Reservation in 1884 to settle the indigenous Quechan people. Much of the land was disputed in the 1890s and in 1910, the Dawes Severalty Act opened the land to white settlers which led to further disputes. A series of court battles between the United States and the landholders led to the United States winning a decision and acquiring the land in 1898.

Farmers immediately began constructing gravity-fed irrigation systems in the area which proved inconsistent and ultimately ineffective. In 1902, the Reclamation Act was passed, allotting funds for western farm development and creating the U.S. Bureau of Reclamation (known as the Reclamation Service until 1923). Subsequently, in 1903, U.S. President Theodore Roosevelt turned the entire Fort Yuma Indian Reservation over to the Bureau of Reclamation for development. Future farmers in the area formed the Yuma County Water Users' Association later in 1903 and in 1904, U.S. Secretary of the Interior Ethan A. Hitchcock authorized the Yuma Project.

=== Laguna Dam ===
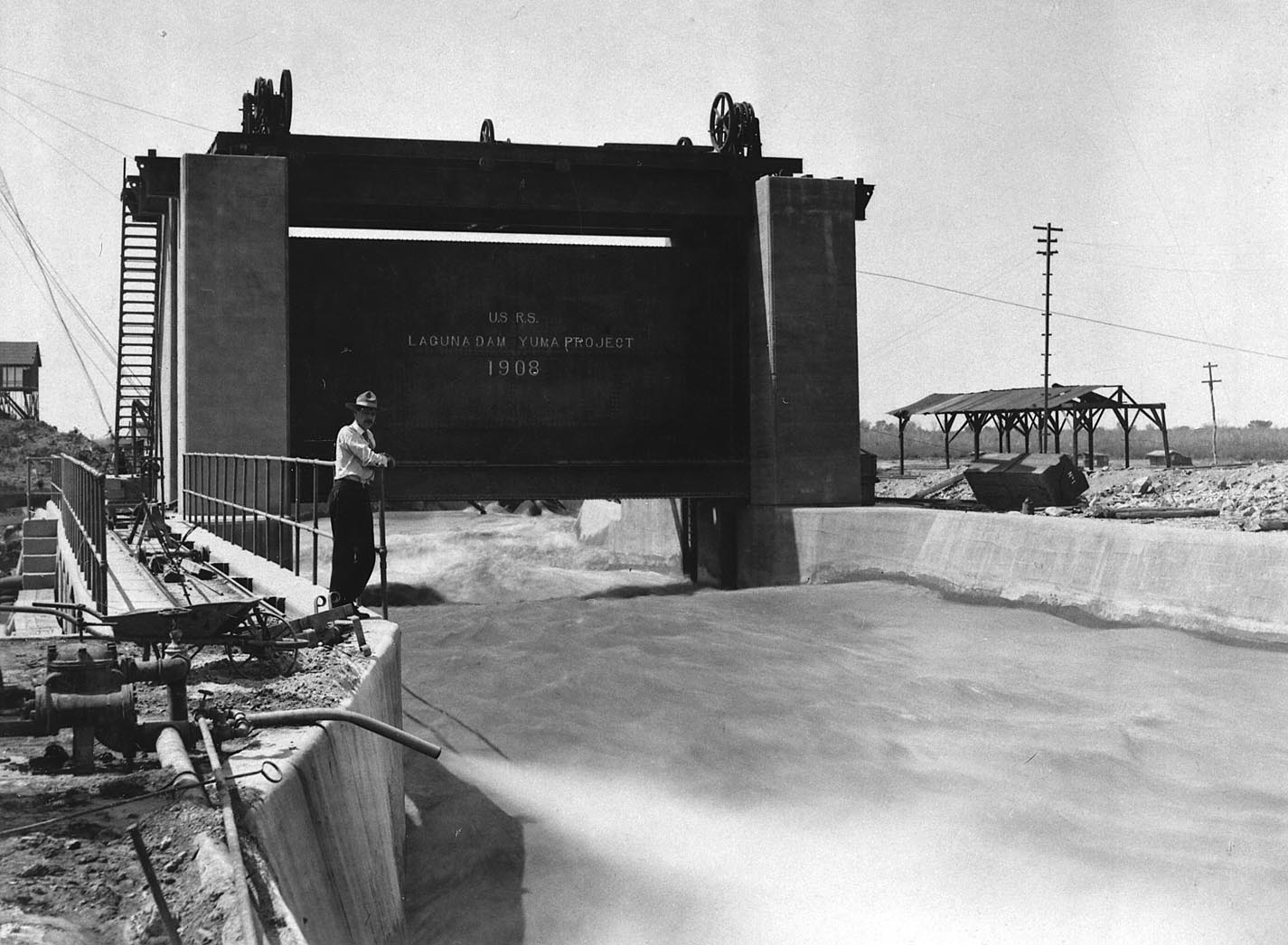
Sluice gate on the Arizona-side of the Laguna Diversion Dam, 1909

The Bureau of Reclamation with project engineer Francis L. Sellew, immediately began purchasing the necessary lands and began the project with the Laguna Diversion Dam on the Colorado River. On July 6, 1905, the contract to build the dam was awarded to J. G. White and Company who started construction less than two weeks later. Deliveries of cement were a problem as they had to be delivered to Yuma by rail and to the construction site by wagons or steamboat. Poor rock quality at local quarries also posed a problem that consistently delayed construction, 50% of the weak rock was unusable. Even after their contract was supplemented to encompass the rock quality delays, J. G. White and Company still did not meet their deadline and the Bureau of Reclamation took over construction in early 1907.

To solve the cement delivery problems, by March 1908, the Bureau of Reclamation built a levee on the California side on the dam that was topped by a rail-line. Beforehand, they had also gained the cooperation of the Southern Pacific Railroad who agreed to deliver cement directly at the dam site. The rock quality problem was solved when the Bureau raised the upstream and downstream cofferdams with rock waste and topped them with rail lines that could deliver rock-fill much faster. By December 1908, the water bypass around the dam was complete and workers began to pour the rock-fill. Three large concrete walls supported by 6-inch (150 mm) sheet-wood pilings were built across the river for the dam's foundation. Rock-fill was placed in between and on the outsides of these walls for support. The California sluiceway consisted of three iron gates while the Arizona had one. Mexican-Americans mostly worked on the dam while a few Native American Indians did as well. White-labor worked in the cooler months.

=== Canals ===
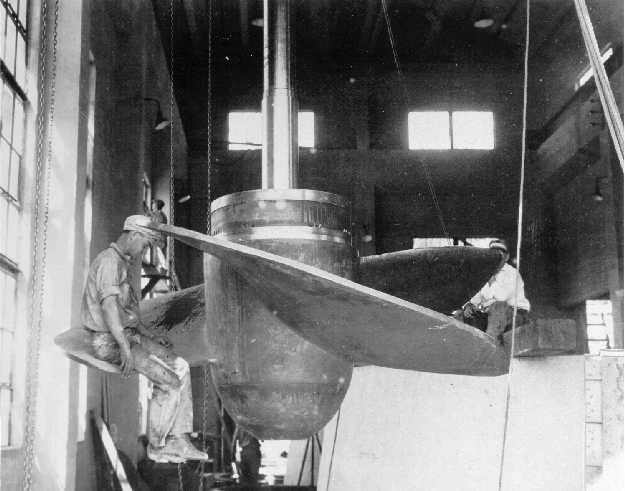
A Bell-type turbine being installed at the Siphon Drop Spillway power plant

Construction on the Yuma Canal which branched off the California side of the Laguna Dam began in 1909. One and half miles from the dam, at Indian Heading, the Yuma Canal splits into the Reservation Main Canal and the Yuma Main Canal. The Yuma Main Canal continues 10.5 miles (16.9 km) southwest until it reaches the 9.9-foot (3.0 m) Siphon Drop Spillway where a power plant was later built in 1926. After another 3.5 miles (5.6 km), it reaches the Colorado River Siphon which siphons the water under the Colorado River. After it reaches Yuma, it split into the East and West Main canals to pass through the Valley Division and to the Mexican border. The Yuma Main Canal along with the East Main Canal and part of the West Main Canal were complete by 1912. The rest of the West Main Canal started again in 1913 and was completed in 1915.

Work on the Reservation Main Canal began in 1907 and its adjacent lateral canals began in 1908. The Mojave and Cocopah Canals were constructed as splits off the Reservation Canal. Construction on the Colorado River Siphon began in 1909 and would initially consist of a 50-foot (15 m) inverted siphon that transfers water via the Yuma Main Canal to the Valley Division. Construction on the siphon was halted in February 1911 after the surrounding sandstone proved too porous and unstable. The Bureau of Reclamation decided to use pneumatic compressed air to finish the construction which sank the siphon further to 76 feet (23 m) and it began to operate on June 29, 1912. In total, the Yuma Project contained 53 miles (85 km) of canal and 218 miles (351 km) of lateral canal.

=== Drains ===
A system of drains, and in some areas wells, were incorporated throughout the project. They drain farming run-off and excess water from the irrigated areas. The Reservation Division's drains discharge directly into the Colorado River and nearly one half of them are intended to intercept leaks from the nearby All-American Canal. In the Valley Divisions, the drains run through its central part while wells exist in the east. All drainage is removed at the Boundary Pumping Station which began operating in 1919.

=== Levees ===
A system of levees was also constructed between 1907 and 1909 in order to protect the banks of the Colorado River from flooding and its historical course-changing meandering. The Reservation levee was constructed on the west bank of the river between Lagunato and Araz. The Yuma Valley levees were on the east bank of the river until the Colorado-Gila River confluence and then to the Mexican border. To maintain the levees, the Bureau of Reclamation built rail lines on top of the Reservation levee so rail cars could reinforce or fill in problem areas. This proved successful during a major flood in 1912 and the Bureau asked Southern Pacific Railway if another line could be built on the Yuma Valley levee but they were reluctant. With its own acquired funding, the Bureau began to construct the Yuma Valley Railway in May 1914 and despite hot temperatures and wage strikes, construction was completed in February 1915.

=== Yuma Auxiliary Project ===
Prior to completing the Laguna Diversion Dam, the Bureau of Reclamation began to consider the Yuma Auxiliary Project which would supplement the Yuma Project in order to irrigate another 45,000 acres (180 km^{2}) of land called Yuma Mesa. Initial surveys of the Mesa began in 1916 and the US Congress approved the Project in 1917. The Project was broken down in units A, B, C and D. Construction began on September 27, 1920, with the Mesa Supply Canal for unit B and in May 1922, the unit's pumping station was also complete. Unit B irrigated as much as 3,000 acres (12 km^{2}) but development of the other three units never materialized. Only 3.6 miles (5.8 km) of canal and 10 miles (16 km) of lateral canals were built. In 1949, after the Laguna Dam ceased to divert water, the Yuma Auxiliary Project was reduced to just over 3,300 acres (13 km^{2}) in sized and the Gila Project took over its water supply.

=== Maintenance and the Imperial Dam change ===
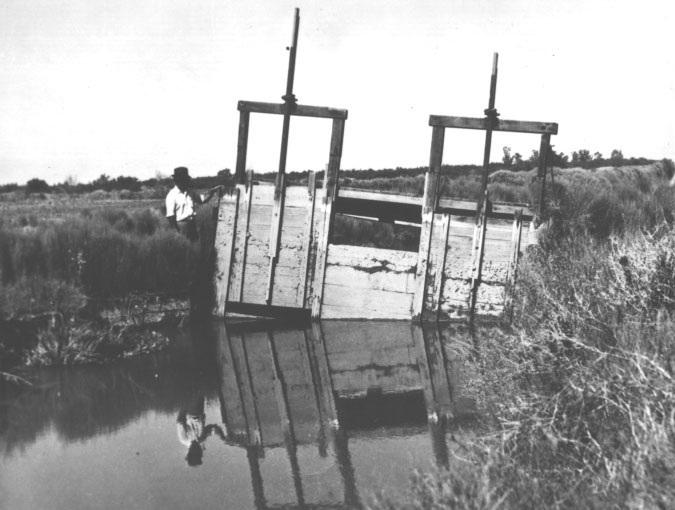
Damage to a canal structure after the 1940 earthquake

Flooding continued to be a problem for the Yuma Project. In January 1916, a flood larger than the one in 1912 caused 800 feet (240 m) in breaks on the Reservation Levee as the Gila River reached a maximum flow of 215,000 cubic feet per second (6,100 m^{3}/s). The river again flooded a few days later, reaching a flow of 162,000 cubic feet per second (4,600 m^{3}/s). Afterward, 10,000 of the 16,000-acre (65 km^{2}) Reservation Division was inundated while 3,000 of the Valley Division's 50,000 acres (200 km^{2}) flooded. The floods also displaced 50,000 yards of main canal. The Bureau of Reclamation worked quickly to restore the project in 15 days. In 1918, the Colorado River's meandering damaged part of the Reservation levee and it was repaired slowly with unskilled labor because of World War I's troop demands. The Laguna Diversion Dam weathered the floods but its downstream talus at its toe was extended between 1923 and 1924 to help better protect it. An earthquake on May 18, 1940, damaged the Project considerably, especially the Valley Division. Canals, levees and other features were damaged but repaired by late May. From 1936 through World War II, Civilian Conservation Corps workers, Indians from Mexico, Italian prisoners and German prisoners all worked to maintain the project.

The Boulder Canyon Project Act in 1928 would signal change for the Yuma Project. The Act authorized the construction of the Hoover Dam which curtailed flooding on the Colorado River but it also authorized the All-American Canal and the Imperial Dam. The Imperial Dam would serve as the lower Colorado's diversion dam and would also supply the Yuma Project with water. The dam was completed in 1938 and in 1941, the Bureau of Reclamation sealed off the Yuma Main Canal from the Laguna Diversion Dam. All outlets from the Laguna Dam were sealed on June 23, 1948, allowing for full supply from the Imperial Dam. Becoming obsolete, the Bureau decommissioned the power plant at the Siphon Drop Spillway in 1972.

== Irrigation data ==
The Yuma Project serves 275 farms and over 94,000 people. In 1992, the Project irrigated 58,626 acres (237.25 km^{2}) of land worth $196,105,730 in crops. The Reservation Division receives on average 123 cubic feet per second (3.5 m^{3}/s) of water while the Valley Division receives 937 cubic feet per second (26.5 m^{3}/s).

== See also ==
- Hoover Dam
- Davis Dam
- Parker Dam
- All-American Canal
