= Laguna Diversion Dam =

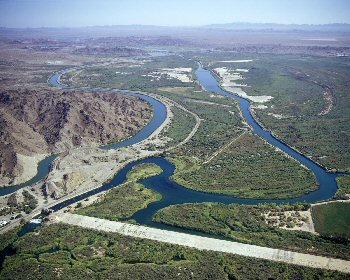
- Overhead of dam facing north

- Location within California
- Location: Imperial County, California / Yuma County, Arizona, US
- Coordinates: 32°49′22″N 114°29′39″W
- Construction began: 1905; 121 years ago
- Opening date: 1909; 117 years ago
- Owner: U.S. Bureau of Reclamation
- Operator: Imperial Irrigation District

Dam and spillways
- Type of dam: Rock-fill weir, concrete surface
- Impounds: Colorado River
- Height: 43 feet (13 m)
- Length: 4,780 feet (1,460 m)
- Spillway type: Controlled service

The Laguna Diversion Dam is a rock-filled diversion dam on the Colorado River. It is located 13 miles (21 km) northeast of Winterhaven, CA–Yuma, AZ on Imperial County route S24. Constructed between 1905 and 1909, the dam was the first dam built on the Colorado River and subsequently ended boat travel to the north.

== History ==
After the passage of the Reclamation Act of 1902 by the US Congress, U.S. Secretary of the Interior Ethan A. Hitchcock authorized the Yuma Project in 1904. This project was the first development of the U.S. Reclamation Service along the Lower Colorado River and featured the Laguna Diversion Dam, a pumping station and a series of canals. On July 6, 1905 the contract to build the dam was awarded to J. G. White and Company who started construction less than two weeks later. Deliveries of cement were a problem as they had to be delivered to Yuma by rail and to the construction site by wagons or steamboat. Poor rock quality at local quarries also posed a problem that consistently delayed construction, 50% of the weak rock was unusable. Even after their contract was supplemented to encompass the rock quality delays, J. G. White and Company still did not meet their deadline and the Bureau of Reclamation took over construction in early 1907.

To solve the cement delivery problems, the Bureau of Reclamation had built a levee on the California side on the dam that was topped by a rail-line by March 1908. Beforehand, they had also gained the cooperation of the Southern Pacific Railroad who agreed to deliver cement directly at the dam site. The rock problem was solved when the Bureau raised the upstream and downstream cofferdams with rock waste and topped them with rail lines that could deliver rock-fill much faster. By December 1908, the water bypass around the dam was complete and workers began to pour the rock-fill. Three large concrete walls supported by 6-inch sheet-wood pilings were built across the river for the dam's foundation. Rock-fill was placed in between and on the outsides of these walls for support. The California sluiceway consisted of three iron gates while the Arizona had one. Mexican-Americans mostly worked on the dam while a few Native American Indians did as well. Skilled white-labor worked in the cooler months.

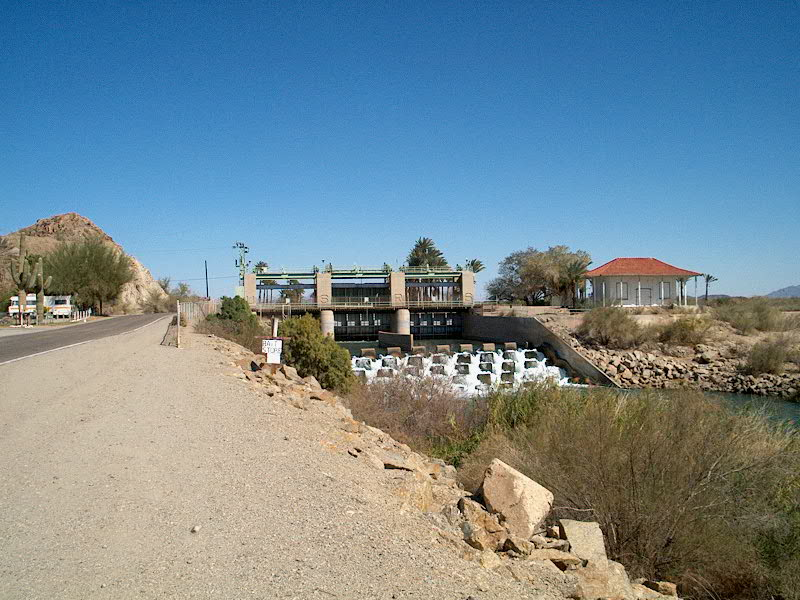
Front of dam

The Laguna Dam's design and size made it a peculiar structure for the time. The dam, a weir, was merely 43 ft. tall, almost two-thirds of which were built below the riverbed. Subsequently, the dam only raised the river ten feet. Modifications to the dam's downstream talus were done between 1923–1924. After the creation of the Imperial Dam 5-miles upstream, the Laguna Diversion Dam was no longer needed and its California diversion outlets were closed on June 23, 1948. Since then, the dam serves to regulate the outflows of the Imperial Dam and often does not impound a large reservoir.

== Bridge ==
The Laguna Bridge at the site is decorated with swastikas, which had been used throughout Arizona before Nazi Germany.

== Fish species ==
- Largemouth Bass
- Striped Bass
- Crappie
- Bullhead catfish
- Catfish (Channel)
- Catfish (Flathead)
- Tilapia
- Redear Sunfish
- Green Sunfish
- Bluegill Sunfish
- Mullet
- Carp
- Bullfrogs

== See also ==
- Mittry Lake – Created by the dam.
- County Route S24
