= All-American Canal =

Aqueduct in southern California

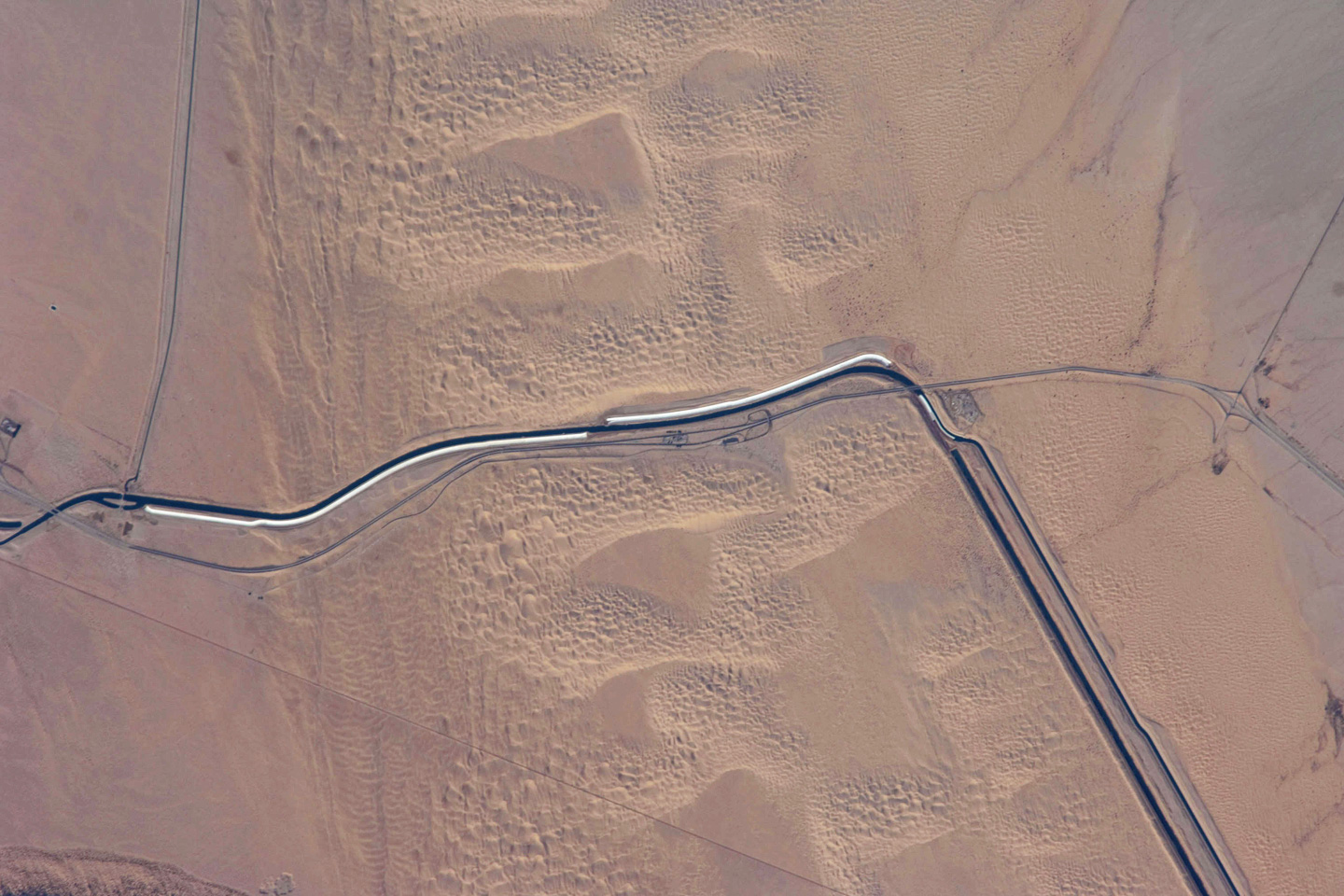
- View of about 15 kilometers (9.3 mi) of the All-American Canal just west of Yuma, Arizona. Note: North is to upper right.

- Location of the mouth

Location
- Country: U.S.
- State: California

Physical characteristics
- Mouth
  - coordinates: 32.875876°N 114.472448°W

The All-American Canal is an 82-mile-long (132 km) aqueduct, located in southeastern California. It conveys water from the Colorado River into the Yuma Project, the Imperial Valley, and to nine cities. It is the Imperial Valley's only water source, and replaced the Alamo Canal, which was located mostly in Mexico. The Imperial Dam, about 30 miles (48 km) northeast of Yuma, Arizona, on the Colorado River, diverts water into the All-American Canal, which runs to just west of Calexico, California, before its last branch heads mostly north into the Imperial Valley. Smaller canals branching off the All-American Canal move water into the Yuma Valley and the Imperial Valley. These canal systems irrigate up to 630,000 acres (250,000 ha) of crop land and have made possible a greatly increased crop yield in this area, originally one of the driest on earth. It is the largest irrigation canal in the world, carrying a maximum of 26,155 cubic feet per second (740.6 m^{3}/s). Agricultural runoff from the All-American Canal drains into the Salton Sea.

The All-American Canal runs parallel to the Mexico–California border for several miles. With over 500 people having drowned in the canal since its completion, it has been called "the Most Dangerous Body of Water in the U.S."

The California Office of Environmental Health Hazard Assessment has issued an advisory for any fish caught in the All-American Canal due to elevated levels of mercury, PCBs, and selenium.

== History ==
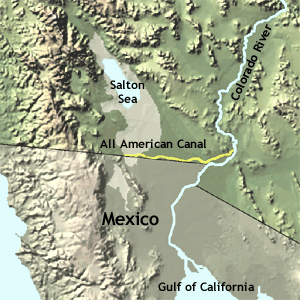
Map showing the All-American Canal (yellow)

The All-American Canal was authorized along with Hoover Dam by the 1928 Boulder Canyon Project Act and built in the 1930s by the United States Bureau of Reclamation and Six Companies, Inc. Its design and construction was supervised by the Bureau's then chief designing engineer, John L. Savage, and was completed in 1942.

In 2016, the canal was designated as a National Historic Civil Engineering Landmark by the American Society of Civil Engineers.

== Operations ==
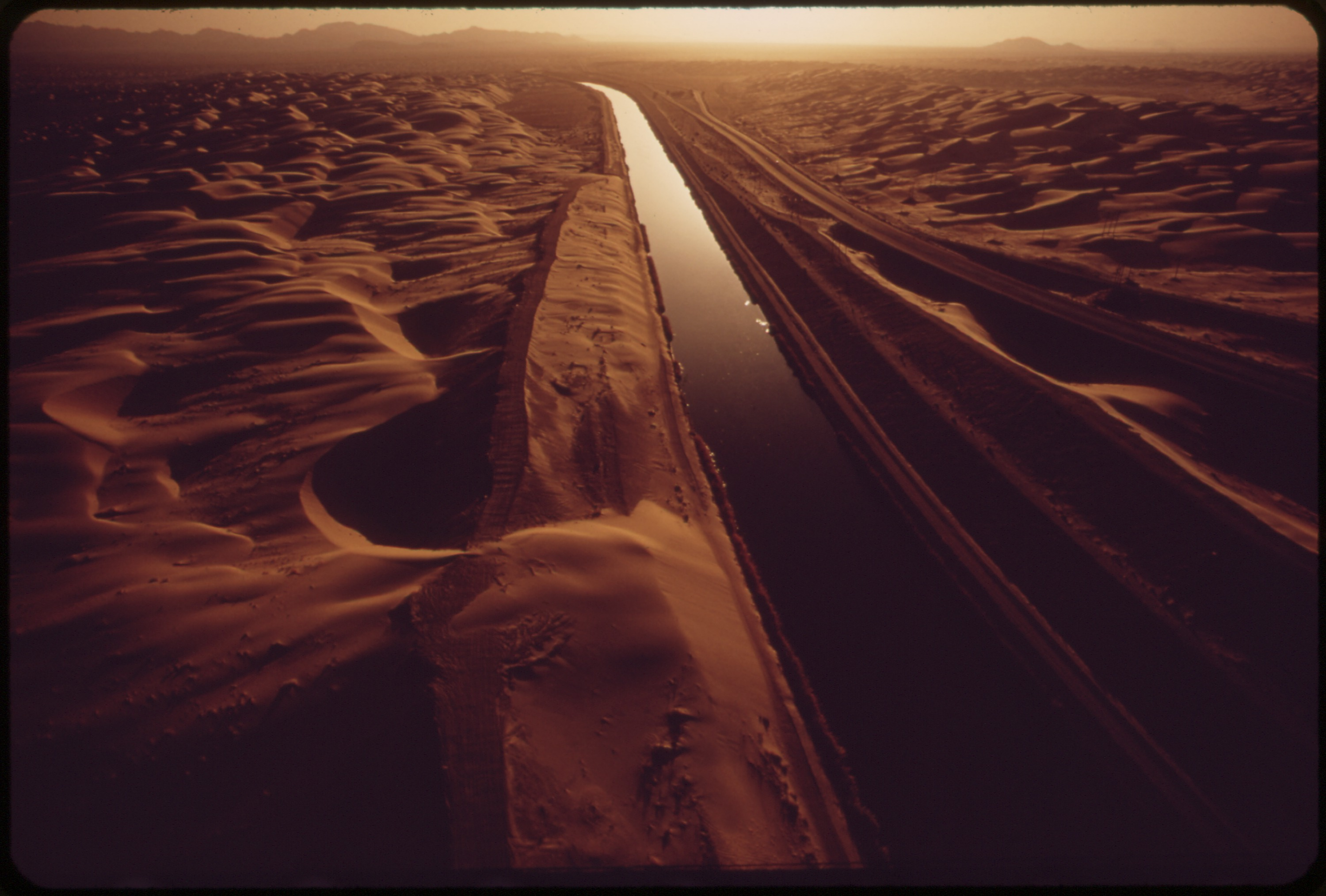
Imperial Valley photograph by Charles O'Rear

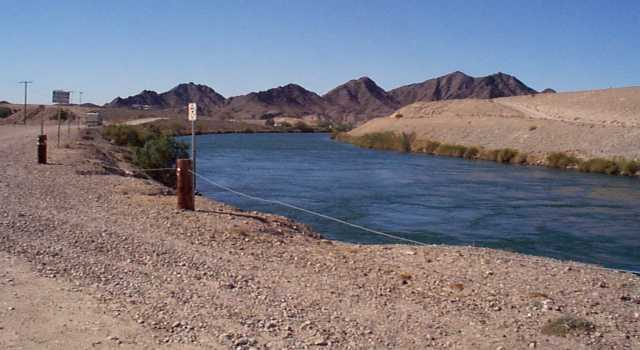
All-American Canal near Algodones Road

=== Irrigation ===
The Bureau of Reclamation owns the canal, but the Imperial Irrigation District operates it. Water for the canal is diverted at the Imperial Diversion Dam. The All-American Canal feeds, from east to west, the Yuma Main Canal, the Coachella Canal, East Highline Canal, Central Main Canal, and the Westside Main Canal. These six main branches of the canal and a network of smaller canals gradually reduce the flow of the All-American Canal until it ends at a small drop in the western Imperial Valley where it drains into the Westside Main Canal. The main canal is 82 miles (132 km) long, with a total drop of 175 feet (53 m), a width of 150 to 700 feet (46 to 213 m) and a depth of 7 to 50 feet (2.1 to 15.2 m). The canals get smaller as they run west because they carry less water.

=== Power ===
Eight hydroelectric power plants have been constructed along drops in the All-American Canal system. Drops 1 through 5, Pilot Knob, and East Highline are located on the All-American Canal. Two other power plants, Double Weir and Turnip, are located on the Central Main Canal and Westside Main Canal branches, respectively. The power plants are all relatively small and have a combined capacity of 58 MW. Electricity generation is dictated by water delivery needs. There is also a 7.2 MW pumped storage plant at Senator Wash Dam. Water from the Senator Wash Reservoir is released when water needs exceed flows at Parker Dam.

=== Runoff ===
Runoff from the farmland irrigated by the All-American Canal make up most of the flows in the Alamo River and New River, both of which drain into the Salton Sea, now providing most of its water. The rest is from smaller rivers and drainage systems. Historically, the Salton Sea had been periodically flooded by extreme Colorado River floods and usually dried up before being reflooded. If not for the All-American Canal, the Salton Sea would have likely dried up long ago. The system transports silt, selenium and salts from the Colorado River into the Salton Sea. Because there is no outlet to the ocean, these salts and minerals are concentrated by evaporation.

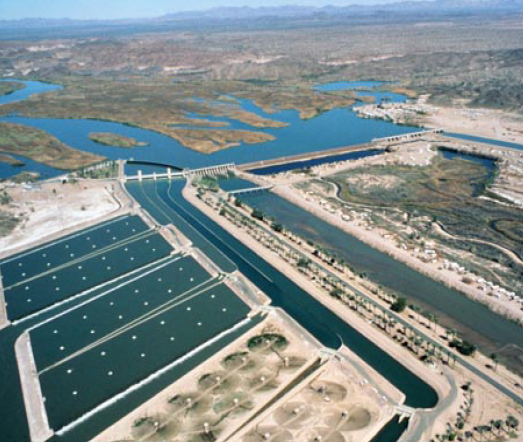
Imperial dam, source of the water

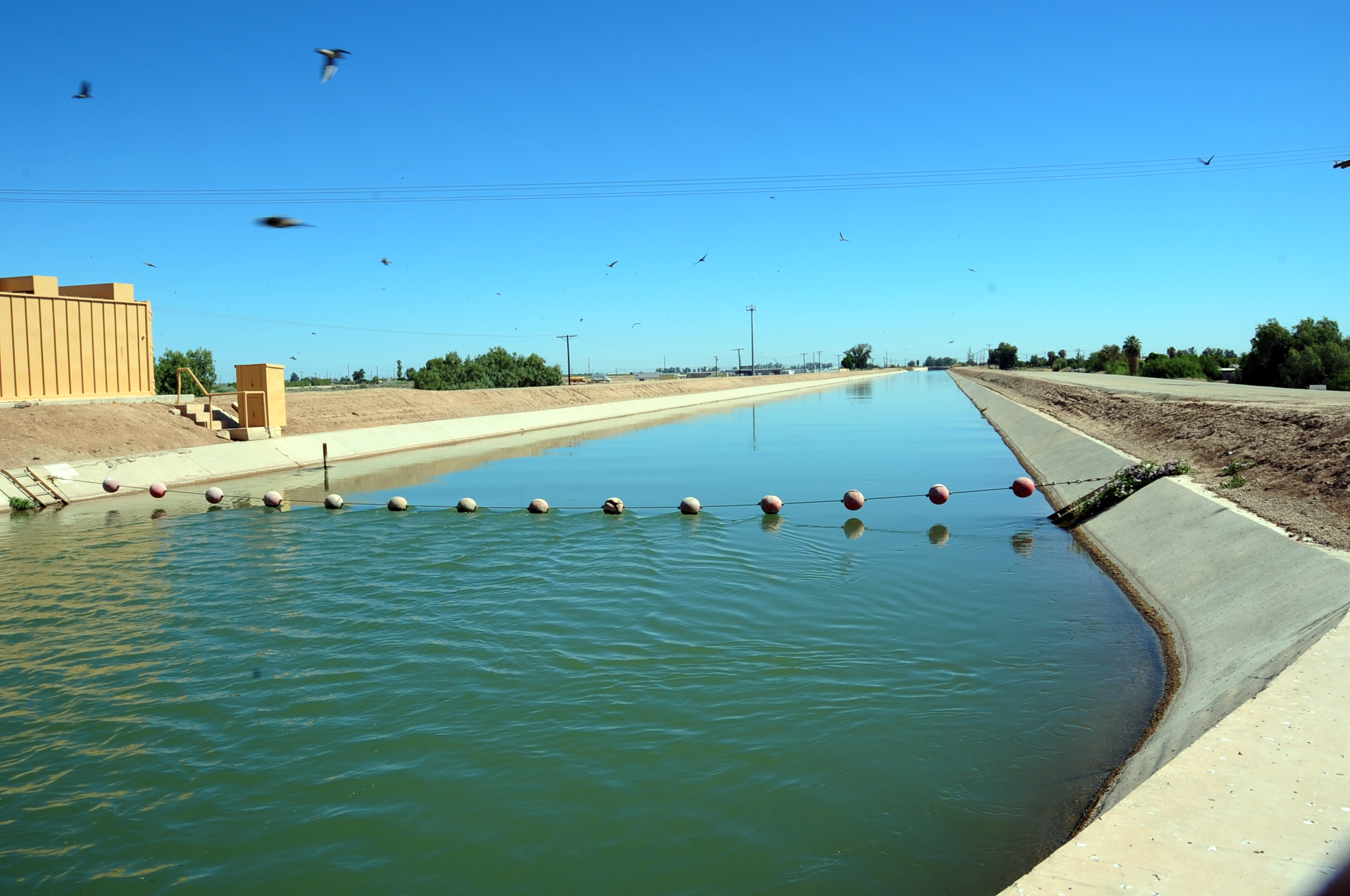
A section of the canal, showing the steep concrete liner and a line of buoys added to prevent drowning

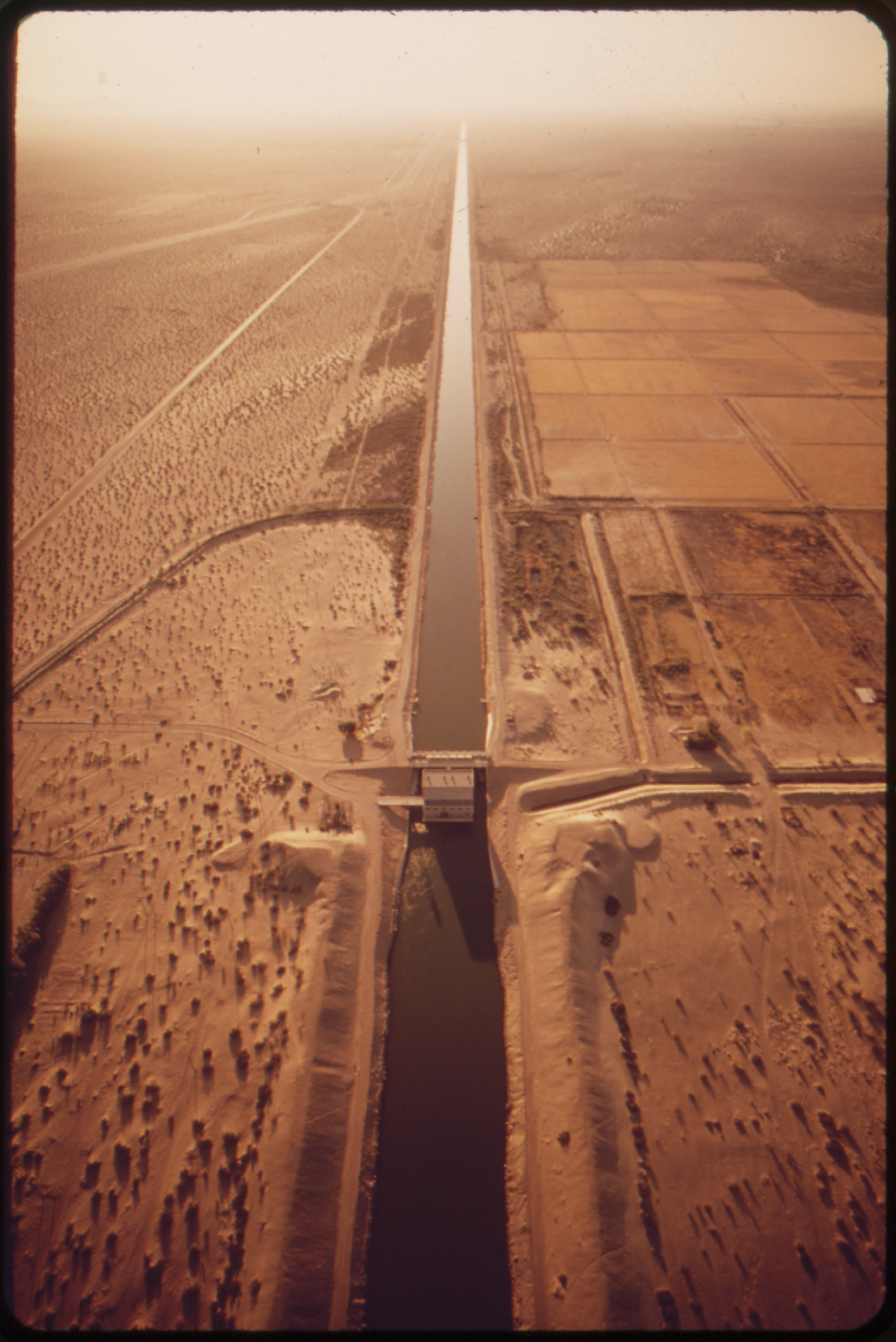
Straight section of canal, photograph by Charles O'Rear

== The All-American Canal Lining Project ==
Approximately 68,000 acre-feet (84,000,000 m^{3}) was lost annually by seepage from the All-American Canal, especially from the point where the canal crosses the great Algodones Dune Field. About 90% of this seepage entered Mexico. At first this seepage caused widespread flooding, but Mexicali Valley residents and businesses built drainage and pumping systems to recover the seepage. Mexicali Valley agriculture became reliant upon this seepage for irrigation. As water use increased in both rural and urban areas, this seepage became an issue of concern. The All-American Canal Lining Project, a part of California's Colorado River Water Use Plan, lined 37 kilometers (23 mi) of the canal to prevent seepage. In 2006, a Mexicali business and civic organization and two California environmental non-profits challenged the lining project in US federal court on the basis that it violated the water rights of Mexican water users and violated US environmental statutes due to the seepage's effects on the nearby Andrade Mesa Wetlands. A rider in the Tax Relief and Health Care Act of 2006 required the completion of the lining project, however, and the lawsuit was rendered moot. The Imperial Irrigation District built a parallel canal along the designated section of the original canal, and the water flow was rerouted into the new lined canal. Construction began in 2007 and was completed in 2009.

== Drowning deaths ==
Over 500 people have drowned in the All-American Canal since its completion due to deep, cold water, steep sides that make escape difficult, and swift currents that can reach 5.45 mph (8.77 km/h). Many of those killed are undocumented immigrants attempting to cross the canal after passing the U.S.–Mexico border. Deaths peaked at 31 in 1998 after increased border security measures in San Diego forced migrants to cross the border in other areas. In 2011 the Imperial Irrigation District allocated $1.1 million in order to install lines with lifesaving buoys across the canal in 105 locations. Bilingual signs reading "Warning: Dangerous Water" were also installed in 1,414 locations along the canal.

== See also ==
- All-American Canal Bridge
- Brock Reservoir
- California Development Company
- Imperial Land Company
