= All-American Canal Bridge =

- Coordinates: 32.708°N 114.949°W
- Carries: I-8
- Crosses: All-American Canal
- Locale: Imperial County, California

History
- Opened: 1939

The All-American Canal Bridge is a bridge that carries Interstate 8 over the All-American Canal, a canal that supplies water from the Colorado River to the agricultural areas of the Imperial Valley.

The bridge is located in Imperial County, California, east of El Centro. The current eastbound was originally built in 1939 as U.S. Route 80; in 1969, the bridge was widened to include freeway shoulders, and the bridge to serve westbound traffic was built as well.

== See also ==
- Alamo Canal
- Imperial Irrigation District
