= Manzanar, California =

Manzanar
- Location in California
- Coordinates: 36°44′24″N 118°04′50″W
- Country: United States
- State: California
- County: Inyo
- Elevation: 3,727 ft (1,136 m)

Manzanar (Spanish for "apple orchard") was a town in Inyo County, California, United States, founded by water engineer and land developer George Chaffey. Most notably, Manzanar is known for its role in the internment of Japanese Americans during World War II.

It was situated on the former narrow-gauge railway line of the Southern Pacific Railroad, 9 miles (14 km) north of Lone Pine, at an elevation of 3,727 feet (1,136.0 m).

A post office operated at Manzanar from 1911 to 1914. Manzanar was a shipping point for the surrounding apple orchards before the diversion of water through the Los Angeles Aqueduct from the Owens Valley to Los Angeles.

During World War II, the area was the location of the Manzanar War Relocation Center, where people of Japanese ancestry were held.

== Owens Valley Paiute ==
Manzanar was first inhabited by Native Americans nearly 10,000 years ago. Approximately 1,500 years ago, the area was settled by the Owens Valley Paiute, who ranged across the Owens Valley from Long Valley on the north to Owens Lake on the south, and from the crest of the Sierra Nevada on the west to the Inyo Mountains on the east. Other Native American nations in the region included the Miwok, Western Mono, and Tubatulabal to the west, the Shoshone to the south and east, and the Mono Lake Paiute to the north. The Owens Valley Paiute hunted and fished, collected pine nuts, and raised crops utilizing irrigation in the Manzanar area. They also traded brown-ware pottery for salt from the Saline Valley, and traded other wares and goods across the Sierra Nevada during the summer and fall.

The Owens Valley received scant attention from European Americans until the early 1860s, as it was little more than a crossroads on the routes through the area. When gold and silver were discovered in the Sierra Nevada and the Inyo Mountains, the resulting sudden influx of miners, farmers, cattlemen and their hungry herds brought conflict with the Owens Valley Paiute, whose crops were being destroyed.

Approximately one-third of the Native Americans in the Owens Valley were relocated to Fort Tejon. "The Army didn't take them on a direct route, either, said Owens Valley Paiute elder Irene Button. "They were forced to walk all the way around the eastern shore of Owens Lake" (covers an area of approximately 108 square miles (280 km^{2})). After 1863, many returned to their permanent villages, established along creeks flowing down from the Sierra Nevada mountains. In the Manzanar area, the Owens Valley Paiute had established villages along Bairs, Georges, Shepherds, and Symmes creeks.

== Ranchers ==
When European American settlers first arrived in the Owens Valley in the mid-19th century, they found a number of large Paiute villages in the Manzanar area. John Shepherd, one of the first of the new settlers, homesteaded 160 acres (65 ha) of land 3 miles (5 km) north of Georges Creek in 1864. With the help of Owens Valley Paiute field workers and laborers, he expanded his ranch to 2,000 acres (810 ha).

As the area was developed, its farmers by 1922 produced "probably 90 per cent Winesaps on 400 to 500 acres (160 to 200 ha) of bearing trees," even with its "limited water supply." Inyo County agricultural agent J.P. Hertel predicted that year the growers would "no doubt plant many more trees in the future and irrigate them by the development of large wells."

In 1925 it was known as "one of the best apple and peach districts in California."

== Township ==
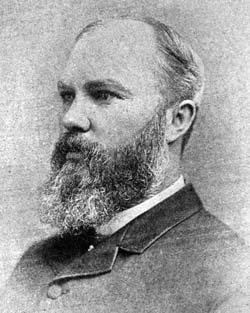
George Chaffey

In 1905, George Chaffey, an agricultural developer from Southern California, purchased Shepherd's ranch and subdivided it, along with other adjacent ranches. He founded the town of Manzanar in 1910, "on the main trunk line of the Southern Pacific." By August 1911, the town had a population of "almost 200 people."

The articles of incorporation for a Manzanar Water Company were filed on September 15, 1910, with capital stock of $250,000. The incorporators, directors, and subscribers were G.A. Hanson, Isaac Baxter and C.E. Searls.

In January 1911, the Inyo County Board of Supervisors approved an application by Chaffey's Owens Valley Improvement Company for a telephone line linking Independence, Lone River, Owengo, Francis, Citrus and Manzanar.

The company built an irrigation system over an area of a thousand acres and planted about twenty thousand fruit trees.

Ira L. Hatfield was the town's first postmaster, appointed in May 1911. The first post office was at Thebes, a town 1.5 miles away.

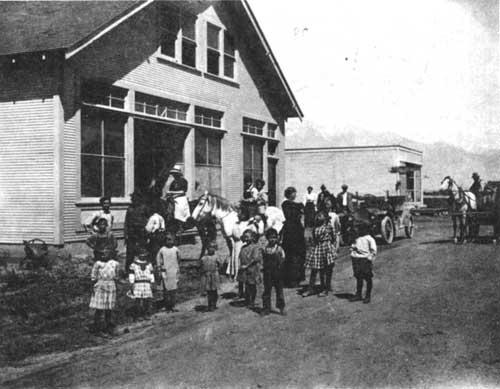
Manzanar Community Hall, ca. 1912. In back is Hatfield's (later Bandhauer's) General Store, which housed the post office.

In summer 1911, a "one and a half story building, 40x50" was erected at the corner of Francis and Independence avenues. The lower floor included a hall to be used "for public gatherings, church, Sunday-school and dancing." Four rooms were to be used for a company office, a barber shop and "other small lines of business." The upper floor was planned for "a good-sized hall to be used for lodge purposes."

By 1920, the town had more than twenty-five homes, a two-room school, a town hall, and a general store. Also at that time, nearly 5,000 acres (2,000 ha) of apple, pear, and peach trees were under cultivation; along with crops of grapes, prunes, potatoes, corn and alfalfa; and large vegetable and flower gardens.

"Manzanar was a very happy place and a pleasant place to live during those years, with its peach, pear, and apple orchards, alfalfa fields, tree-lined country lanes, meadows and corn fields," said Martha Mills, who lived at Manzanar from 1916 to 1920.

== Quenching Los Angeles' thirst ==
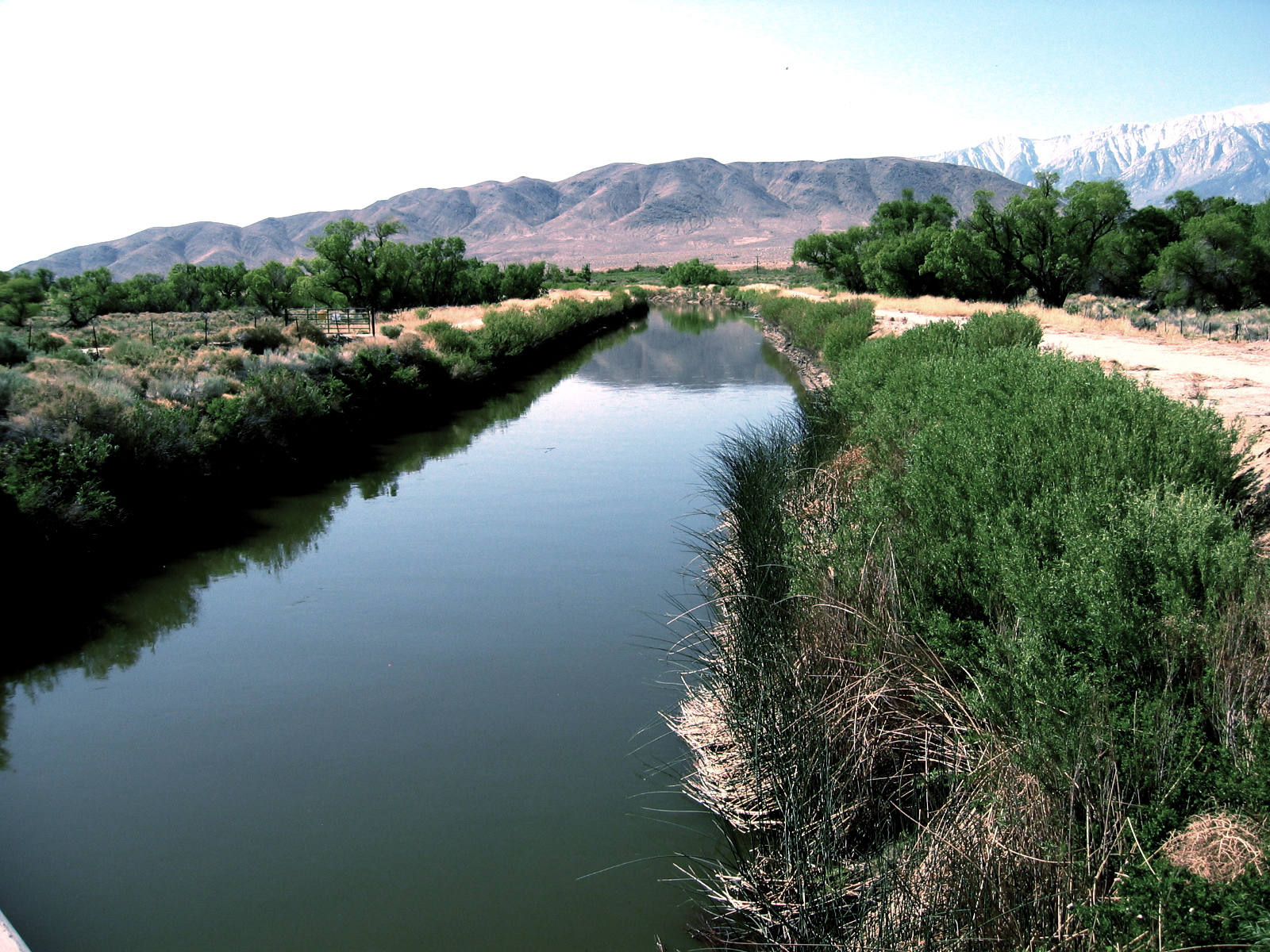
Unlined section of the Los Angeles Aqueduct, just south of Manzanar near U.S. Route 395, 2007

In 1913, the City of Los Angeles completed construction of its 233-mile (375 km) Los Angeles Aqueduct. It did not take long for Los Angeles water officials to realize that Owens River water was insufficient to supply the rapidly growing metropolis. In 1920, they began to purchase more of the water rights on the Owens Valley floor. As the decade went on, the City of Los Angeles bought out one Owens Valley farmer after another, and extended its reach northward into Mono County, including Long Valley. By 1933, the city owned 85 percent of all town property and 95 percent of all ranch and farm land in the Owens Valley, including Manzanar.

Although some residents sold their land for prices that made them financially independent and relocated, a significant number chose to stay. In dry years, Los Angeles pumped ground water and drained all surface water, diverting all of it into its aqueduct and leaving Owens Valley ranchers without water. Without water for irrigation, the holdout ranchers left their ranches and their communities; that included the town of Manzanar, which was abandoned by 1929.

There was so much water during those early years, that when a horse pulled a buggy, the water frequently came up to the horse's knees," said Lucille DeBoer, who lived on a ranch at Manzanar. "When this happened, the children took off their shoes and socks to walk home. In the early 1900s the City of Los Angeles started to purchase ranches in the Owens Valley for the sole purpose of supplying water to the people in Los Angeles. People started to sell their land to the city, which put in wells to drain the water out of the ground; the trees began to die; and the land finally turned to vacant dirt. This ended the Land of the Big Red Apples"

By the beginning of August 1924, however, "the purchase of the Manzanar district for $780,000 was consummated by Los Angeles."

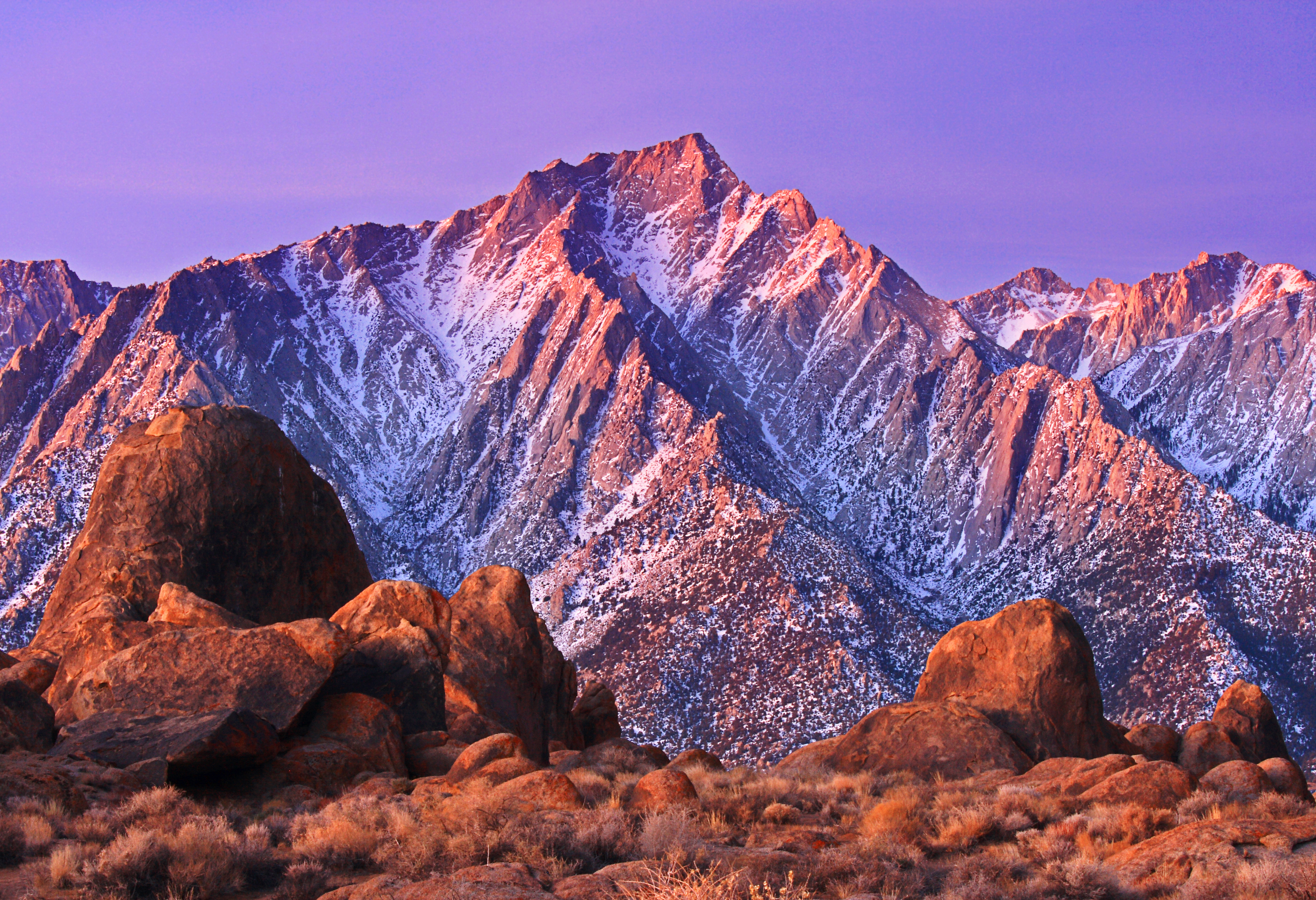
The Alabama Hills, 2009

The 4,958-acre (2,006 ha) Manzanar tract of 68 parcels was obtained by the city for an "aggregate price" of $788,120 ($159 an acre). It was described as lying "between the north end of the Alabama Hills and the town of Independence." It was fed by the "Shepard [sic], George, Bairs, Symmes and Pinyon creeks." City engineer William Mulholland said the land would be valuable to the city "chiefly as a subterranean reservoir of water."

By 1925, as a result of farmers and others moving away from Manzanar as Los Angeles purchased their properties, the "two-teacher school" was expected to have only seven pupils.

The Manzanar and Independence, California, school districts were merged, but the combined district was suspended, or it lapsed, in 1934.

The ranches remained, and Los Angeles offered the land and the buildings on them for lease. Many farmers who had sold out leased their farms back. Water from a new well was made available to some. Victor M. Christopher, who had been working for the Owens Valley Improvement Company, was hired by the city to "look after the maintenance and leasing of the whole tract."

Manzanar remained uninhabited until the United States Army leased 6,200 acres (2,500 ha) from the City of Los Angeles for the Manzanar War Relocation Center.

== Additional reading ==
- John L. Von Blon, "Los Angeles Finds Farming a Hard Game," Los Angeles Times, November 20, 1927, image 145
- "Los Angeles Is Both Farmer and Farmland Here," Los Angeles Times, November 20, 1927, image 150
