= William Chaffey =

Canadian engineer and irrigation planner

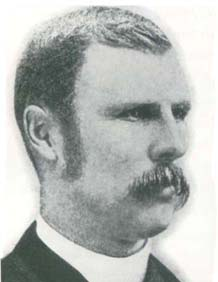
- Born: 21 October 1856; Brockville
- Died: 4 June 1926 (aged 69)
- Occupation: Civil engineer, engineer
- Relatives: George Chaffey

William Benjamin Chaffey CMG (21 October 1856 – 4 June 1926) was a Canadian engineer and irrigation planner who with his older brother George Chaffey developed what became the Californian cities of Etiwanda, Ontario, and Upland in the United States of America, as well as the Victorian city of Mildura and the South Australian town of Renmark in Australia.

== Life ==
Chaffey was born in Brockville, Ontario, Canada, the third son of George and his wife Anne née Legoe. The Chaffey brothers developed irrigation colonies, named by them Etiwanda and Ontario, on the Cucamonga Plain in the early 1880s. The brothers had bought land and water-rights at a low price and resold 10 acre (4 ha) blocks to settlers; a non-profit mutual irrigation company distributed water.

Alfred Deakin, then a minister in the Victorian government and chairman of a royal commission on water supply, visited the irrigation areas of California in 1885 where he met George and William Chaffey. George Chaffey visited Victoria in February 1886 and excited by the prospects for irrigation in the Murray River valley, cabled William to sell their interests in California. The quick asset sale resulted in the brothers realising less than true value, but George soon arrived in Victoria.

== Chaffey Brothers Irrigation Works ==
After some discussions in the Victorian parliament, the Chaffey brothers commenced development on 250,000 acres (101,170 ha) of land near Mildura. They also began works on 250,000 acres (1,000 km^{2}) around Renmark, South Australia after an offer by the premier of South Australia, Sir John Downer. William remained in Mildura and the Renmark area was managed by a younger brother, Charles F. Chaffey, who came from California. Although the new towns were well planned, there was some settler dissatisfaction about the loss of water from seepage. Disputes about the Chaffey's practices were discussed in the Victorian parliament. A collapse of the Melbourne land boom also contributed to problems faced by the Chaffeys. After a government report, the Mildura Irrigation Trust took over from the Mildura Irrigation Co. in September 1895.

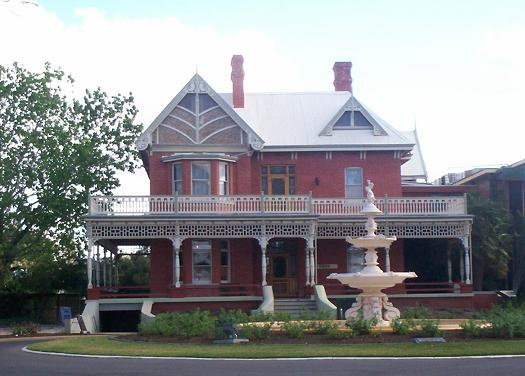
Rio Vista, former home of W.B. Chaffey and his family in Mildura, Victoria, Australia.

On 10 December 1895, their Australian projects went bankrupt and George returned to the United States. Charles, whose home "Olivewood" still stands in Renmark, also returned to America before settling in Vancouver, British Columbia, Canada.

William Benjamin Chaffey (known as W.B.) remained in Mildura, bringing his 200-acre (81 ha) orchard into production and establishing the Mildura (later Mildara) Winery Pty Ltd. Active from 1895 in the development of marketing procedures for local fruit, Chaffey was a leading member of both the Mildura and the Australian Dried Fruits associations, president of the latter for many years.

William Chaffey was elected president of the Mildura Shire Council in 1903 and became mayor in 1920. The residents of Mildura presented Chaffey with a Ford motor car in December 1911 in appreciation of the "ability and determination" shown by him in "aiding the development of the area and in proving conclusively the value of irrigated horticulture".

Chaffey died at age 69 on 4 June 1926 in Mildura, survived by his second wife and their two daughters and a son; two sons and a daughter of the first marriage also survived him.

== Legacy ==
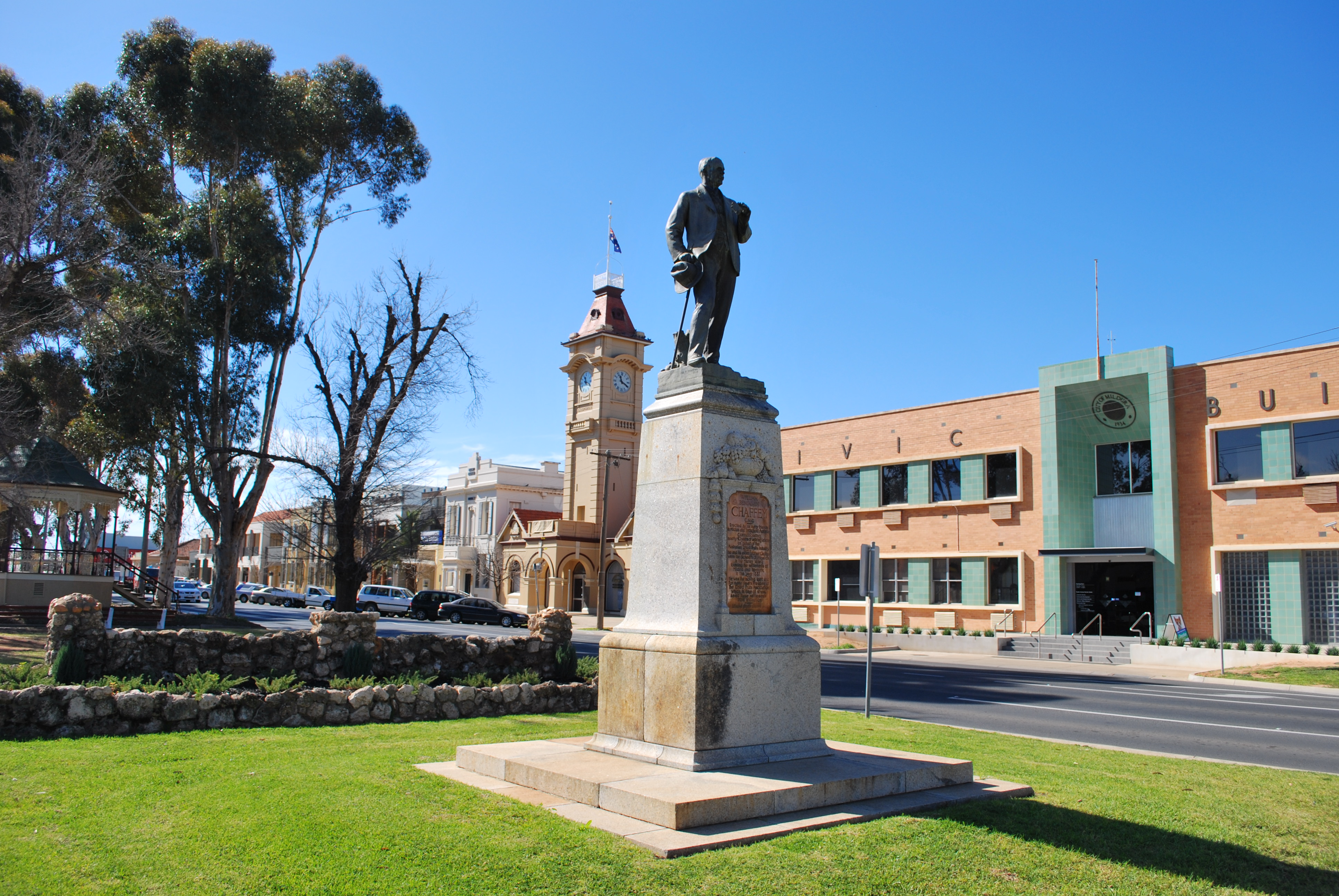
Statue of William Chaffey at Mildura, Victoria.

A statue of Chaffey by Paul Montford stands in Mildura, another stands in Renmark.

The Chaffey Trail, a self-guided tour, guides visitors to Mildura through key heritage sites and buildings related to the work the Chaffey brothers.
