= Etiwanda, Rancho Cucamonga, California =

Coordinates: 34.124127°N 117.524199°W

Etiwanda is the easternmost of three formerly unincorporated communities that became part of Rancho Cucamonga, California, in 1977.

== History ==
In November 1881, George and William Chaffey purchased the land from Joseph Garcia, a retired Portuguese sea captain. The town was named for a Native American tribe living on the shores of Lake Michigan. As the first town planned by the Chaffey brothers, Etiwanda became their test bed. The Etiwanda Water Company, a mutual water company and pipe system of irrigation designed by George Chaffey became the standard for water system management in southern California. Two other events are a further testament to the Chaffeys' innovation. The first long-distance telephone call in southern California was completed between San Bernardino and Etiwanda in 1882 and the Chaffey-Garcia house boasted electric lights on December 4, 1882.

The Pacific Electric Railway, the "Big Red Cars" reached Etiwanda in 1914, with rails reaching Etiwanda from Upland by December 1913 on a line that connected San Bernardino to the east with the greater Los Angeles basin to the west. The line opened on March 24, 1914. Regular passenger operations ended on November 1, 1941, although specials operated for several years, especially during World War II. On October 1, 1951, the San Bernardino line was completely dieselized and the trolley wire was removed shortly thereafter. As of 2011, the 1914-vintage PE passenger station is being restored to an as-constructed state.

== Education ==
The community of Etiwanda has elementary, middle, and high schools that are part of the Etiwanda School District and Chaffey Joint Union High School District.
