= Brock Reservoir =

Reservoir in Imperial County, California, United States

- Location within California Location within the United States
- Location: Imperial County, California, United States, near Gordons Well, California
- Coordinates: 32.716°N 115.036°W
- Type: Reservoir
- Basin countries: United States
- Managing agency: Imperial Irrigation District
- Surface area: 485 acres (196 ha)
- Average depth: 22 feet (6.7 m)
- Max. depth: 22 ft (6.7 m)
- Water volume: 8,000 acre-feet (9,900,000 m^{3})
- Website: www.iid.com/water/water-transportation-system/colorado-river-facilities/brock-reservoir

Brock Reservoir is an artificial reservoir located near Gordons Well, California. When a water request from Lake Mead is made, it takes time to travel the canal system to its destination. If the request is changed or canceled before it reaches its destination, the water is diverted to Brock Reservoir for storage. It has a small maximum volume of only 8,000 acre-feet (2,600 million US gallons), but is expected to be filled and emptied many times each year. It holds water from the All-American Canal until it can be used for nearby agriculture.

== Structure ==
The reservoir sits on about 485 acres (196 ha), and consists of two basins. The basins are enclosed by earthen berms lined with polyethylene and covered with a 10 inches (250 mm) layer of soil cement. A 6.5 miles (10.5 km) inlet channel connects the reservoir to the All-American Canal with a .25 miles (0.40 km) canal and siphon system returning the water to the All-American Canal for use by farmers.

Engineers filled the reservoir starting in mid-October 2010 to test for leaks. Over a 28-day period, no leaks were found, and the reservoir only lost 6 inches (150 mm) of water due to evaporation. The reservoir will only be filled with water not used from the canal due to rain providing farmers with the needed water. The water saved in the reservoir will then be used when needed by farmers.

The reservoir is operated remotely by the Imperial Irrigation District, which supplies water to farmers in California. The district can open and close the inlet and outlet gates and regulate the amount of water diverted into the reservoir and returned to the main system.

== Background ==
The reservoir, named after an Imperial Valley farmer and agriculture researcher Warren H. Brock, solves the problem of unused Colorado River water in the All-American Canal being 'lost' to Mexico. When communities and farmers order water near the All American Canal, water is released from storage at Lake Mead. The water takes about five days to reach the region, by which time rain may have provided the needed water. With no local storage, the water continues flowing into Mexico. The idea for the reservoir came following the 2007 drought-management plan adopted by the seven states along the Colorado River. The U.S. Bureau of Reclamation estimates the project could save as much as 70,000 acre-feet (86,000,000 m^{3}) of water a year. The project was approved in 2008, and construction finished in October 2010.

The project cost an estimated $172 million. The three major water districts in the area contributed to the funding of the project, with the Southern Nevada Water Authority contributing $115 million and the Central Arizona Project and Metropolitan Water District of Southern California contributing $28.6 million each. In return for their contribution, Nevada can use 400,000 acre-feet (490,000,000 m^{3}) of water over 20 years and Arizona and California can each use 100,000 acre-feet (120,000,000 m^{3}) starting in 2016. Nevada contributed the most funds for construction because of its risk of running out of water. The more funds contributed to the project, the larger share of saved water the state would receive.

== See also ==
- List of lakes in California
- List of lakes of the Colorado Desert
