= Alamo Canal =

Waterway that connected the Colorado and Alamo Rivers

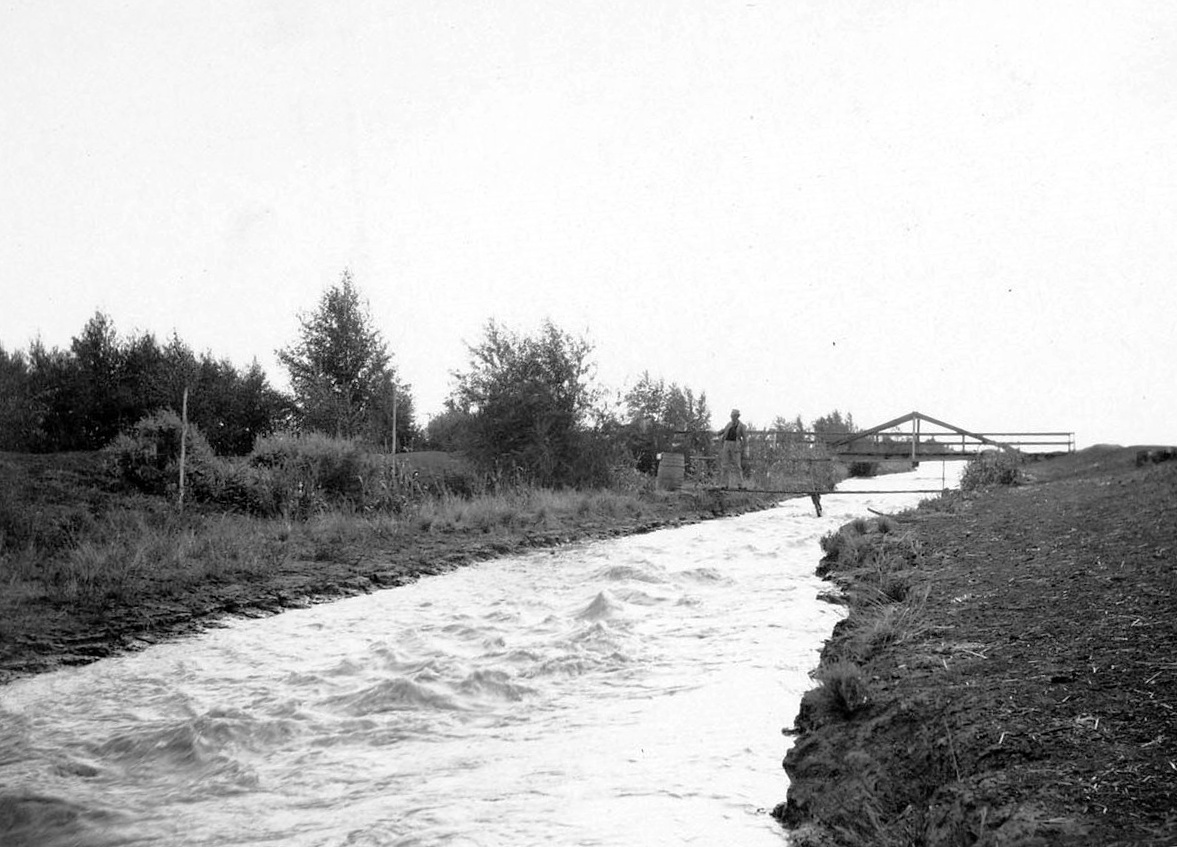
- Original caption: View on Main Canal -- Note High Velocity
- Interactive map of Alamo Canal

Specifications
- Maximum height AMSL: 125 ft (38 m)
- Status: Closed/partially infilled

History
- Former names: Imperial
- Original owner: California Development Company
- Principal engineer: Charles R. Rockwood
- Other engineer: George Chaffey
- Construction began: April 3, 1900
- Date of first use: May 14, 1901
- Date closed: 1942

Geography
- Start point: Near Pilot Knob 32.740137°N 114.710795°W, Imperial County, California, USA
- End point: Head of Alamo River 32.642064°N 114.855938°W, Mexicali Municipality, Baja California, Mexico
- Connects to: Alamo River

The Alamo Canal (Spanish: Canal del Álamo) was a 14 mi (23 km) long waterway that connected the Colorado River to the head of the Alamo River. The canal was constructed to provide irrigation to the Imperial Valley. A small portion of the canal was located in the United States but the majority of the canal was located in Mexico. The Alamo Canal is also known as the Imperial Canal.

== Planning and construction ==
Historically, the Colorado River flowed to the Gulf of California, however in times of the spring floods the Colorado River would overflow its banks and also drain into the Alamo River. Flow from the Alamo River then drained to the Salton Sink area of the Colorado Desert. Such overflow had been observed in 1884, 1891, 1892, and 1895.

In the mid- to late-Nineteenth Century several individuals, most notably O. M. Wozencraft, proposed irrigating the Salton Sink by diverting a controlled gravity-fed flow of the Colorado River through the existing dry Alamo River bed. The Alamo Canal was the first attempt to create that diversion. It was engineered by George Chaffey of the California Development Company starting in 1900.

The canal intake and temporary wooden headgates (known as the Chaffey Gate) were initially located in the United States at Pilot Knob due to the availability of a solid rock foundation. The canal then crossed the border with Mexico and ran parallel to the Colorado River for approximately 4 miles (6 km), where a channel was cut several miles west to the head of the Alamo River. This path was selected to avoid the expensive engineering that would otherwise be required if the canal were to traverse the Algodones Dunes.

A small amount of irrigation water was first delivered to the Imperial Valley in 1901, with larger flows becoming available in 1902.

In 1906 work was completed on the permanent concrete headgates at Hanlon Heading.

== Creation of the Salton Sea ==
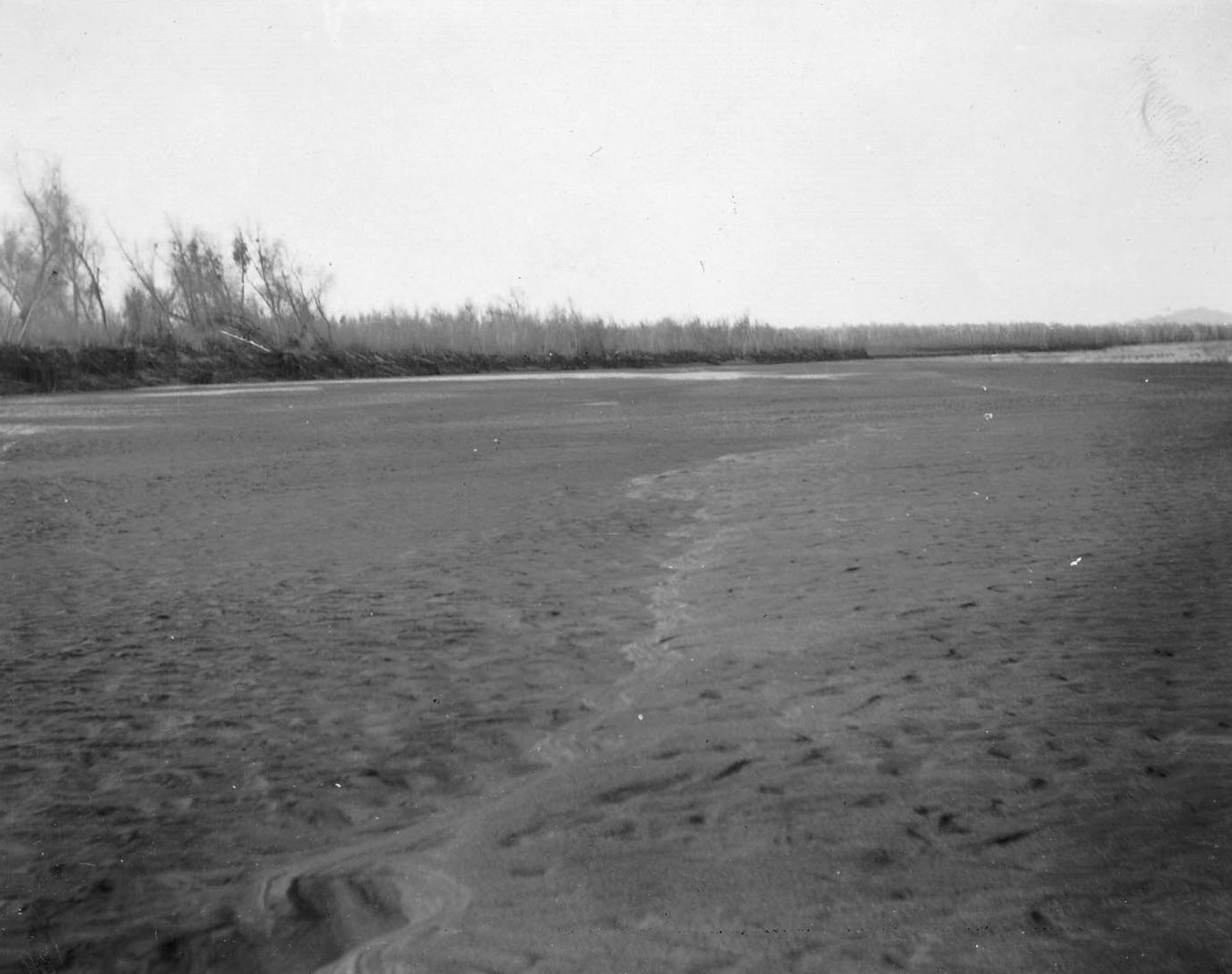
Dry bed of the Colorado River below the Lower Mexican Intake.

In 1904 heavy silting greatly reduced the water-carrying capacity of the canal. Imperial Valley farmers, under considerable financial stress, pressured the California Development Company to resolve the problem. Charles Rockwood, faced with bankruptcy and "after mature deliberation", directed the engineering of a breach in the bank of the Colorado River approximately 4 miles (6.4 km) south of the existing wooden headgates (the Chaffey Gate).

The breach, known as the Lower Mexican Intake, and constructed without headgates and without the permission of the Mexican authorities, allowed the Colorado River to flow unimpeded into the canal, and then to Imperial Valley farms.

During the subsequent seasonal floods of 1904 through to late 1906, a large amount of the water carried in the Colorado River flowed directly into the Salton Sink. At various times during this period the entirety of the Colorado River was diverted into the canal.

Rockwood's action in ordering the breach was later described as a "blunder so serious as to be practically criminal."

Multiple failed attempts were made to close the diversion and establish a controlled flow via headgates. On February 11, 1907, the breach was finally closed after substantial intervention by the Southern Pacific Transportation Company.

== Legacy and replacement ==
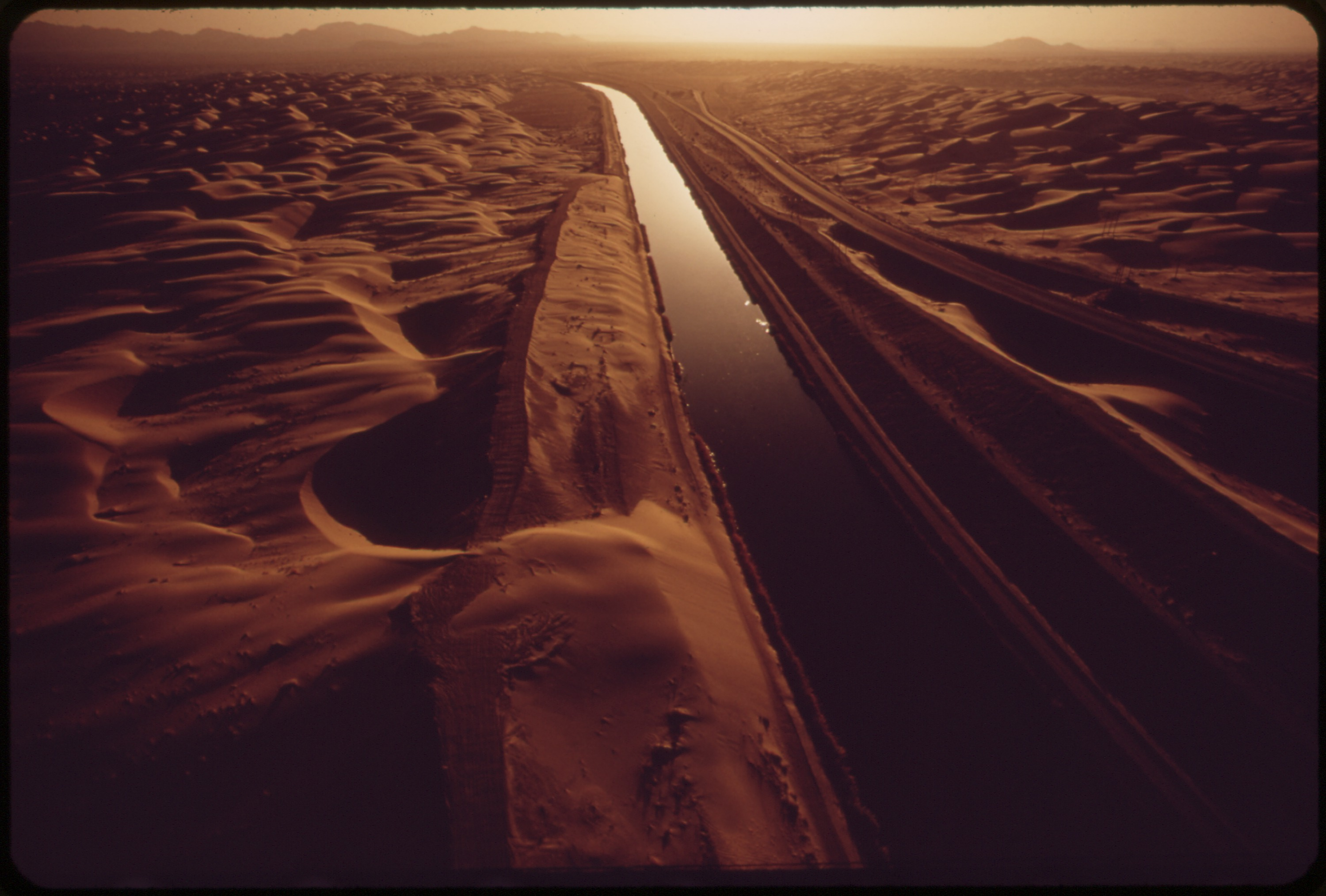
The replacement All-American Canal traversing the Algodones Dunes.

The rate of water loss through aquifer replenishment and evaporation in the Salton Sink was much less than the massive inflow of the Colorado River via the third diversion of the Alamo Canal (the "Lower Mexican Intake"). As a direct result of the decision to create canal intakes from the Colorado River without headgates the Salton Sea was formed. Ongoing provision of water to the Imperial Valley from the Alamo Canal ensured that the Salton Sea would remain intact through the lifetime of the canal.

The initial flooding of the Salton Sink destroyed the New Liverpool Salt Company works. On January 10, 1908, the owners of the works were awarded a judgement against the California Development Company of $458,246.23. Southern Pacific, which incurred considerable costs repairing the breaches, held a judgment against California Development of $3,772,128.52. By June, 1915 a total of $5,049,554.78 was owed to creditors, with most of those costs and judgments directly related to the failure of the canal.

This debt triggered the bankruptcy of California Development, with all assets passed to Southern Pacific. In 1911 Imperial Valley farmers formed the Imperial Irrigation District. By 1916 the Imperial Irrigation District had purchased all the ex-California Development assets from Southern Pacific and assumed operation of the canal.

Construction of the All-American Canal was completed in 1940. By 1942 the All-American Canal was the sole canal providing Colorado River water to the Imperial Valley.

== Images ==
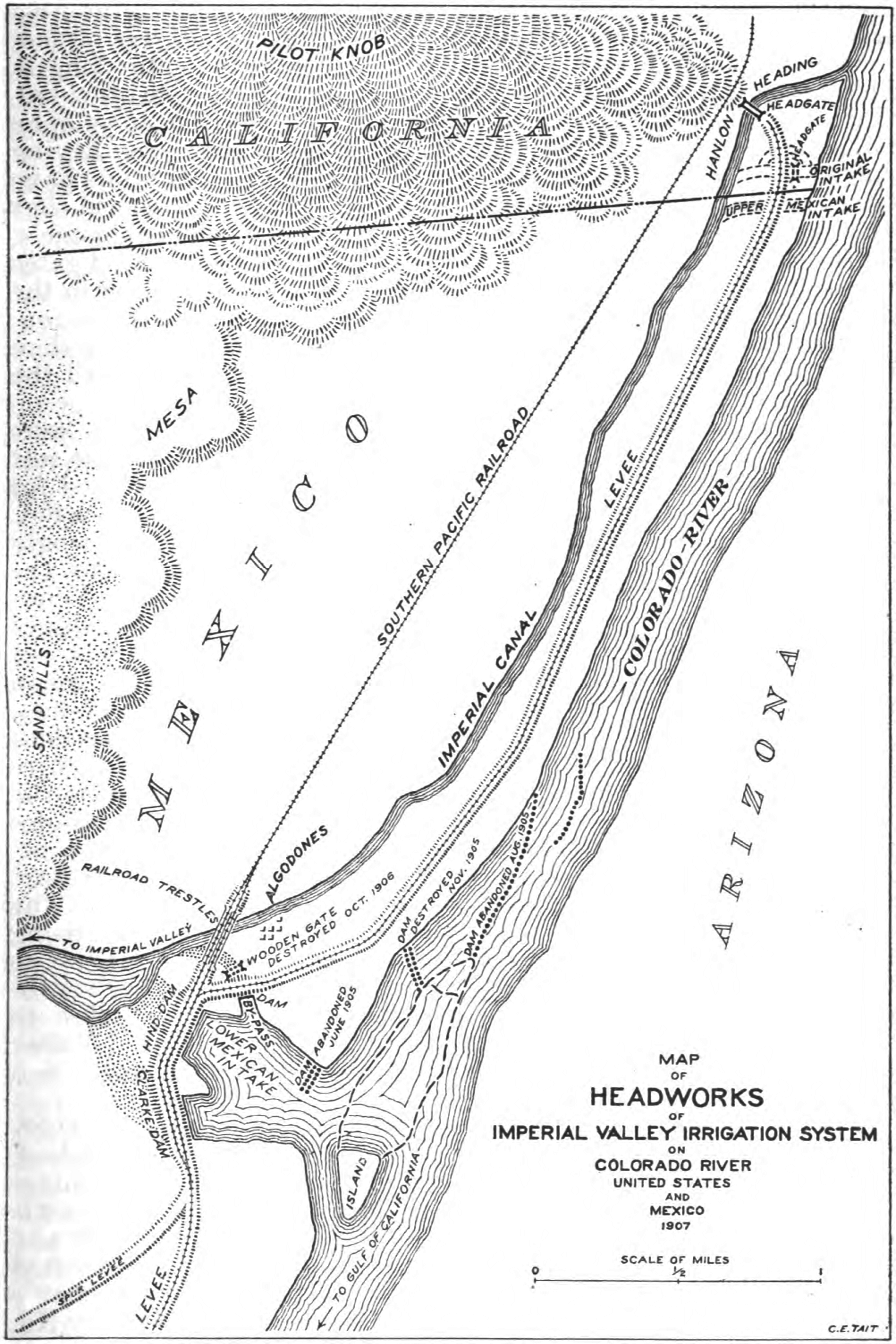
Alamo Canal construction and diversion history, as of 1908.

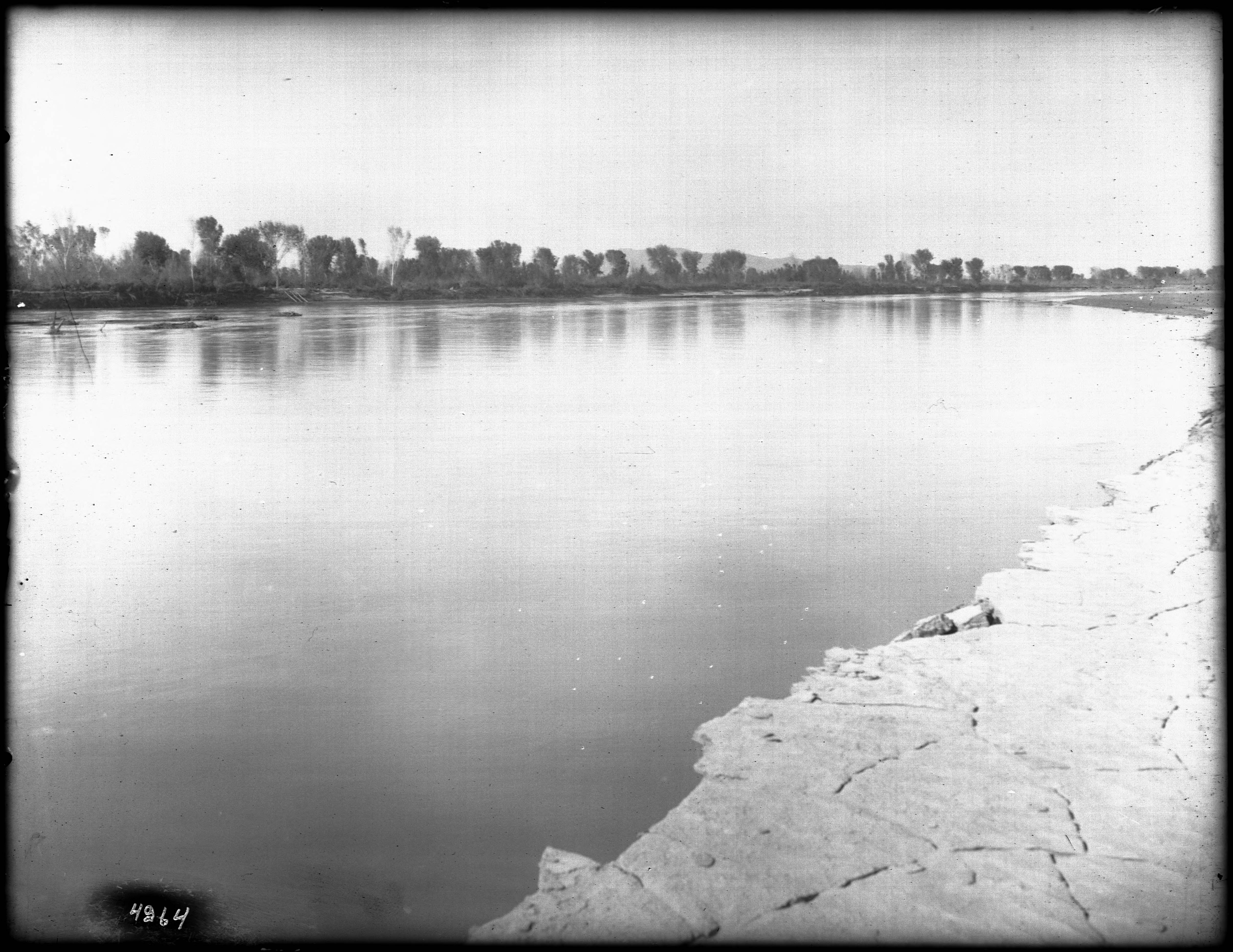
Alamo Canal c. 1903.

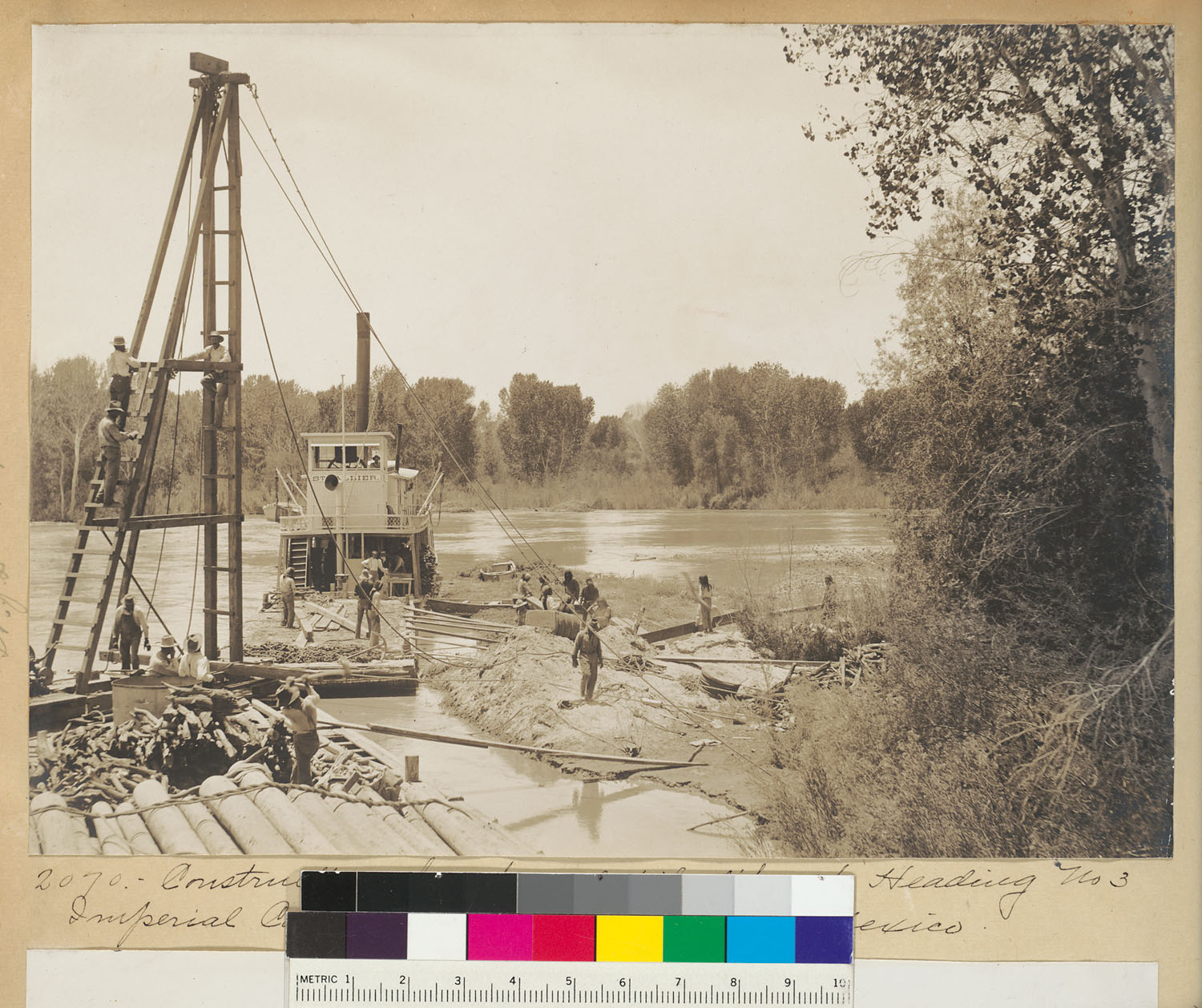
A crew erecting a dike at the third heading of the Alamo Canal in Mexico, 1905.

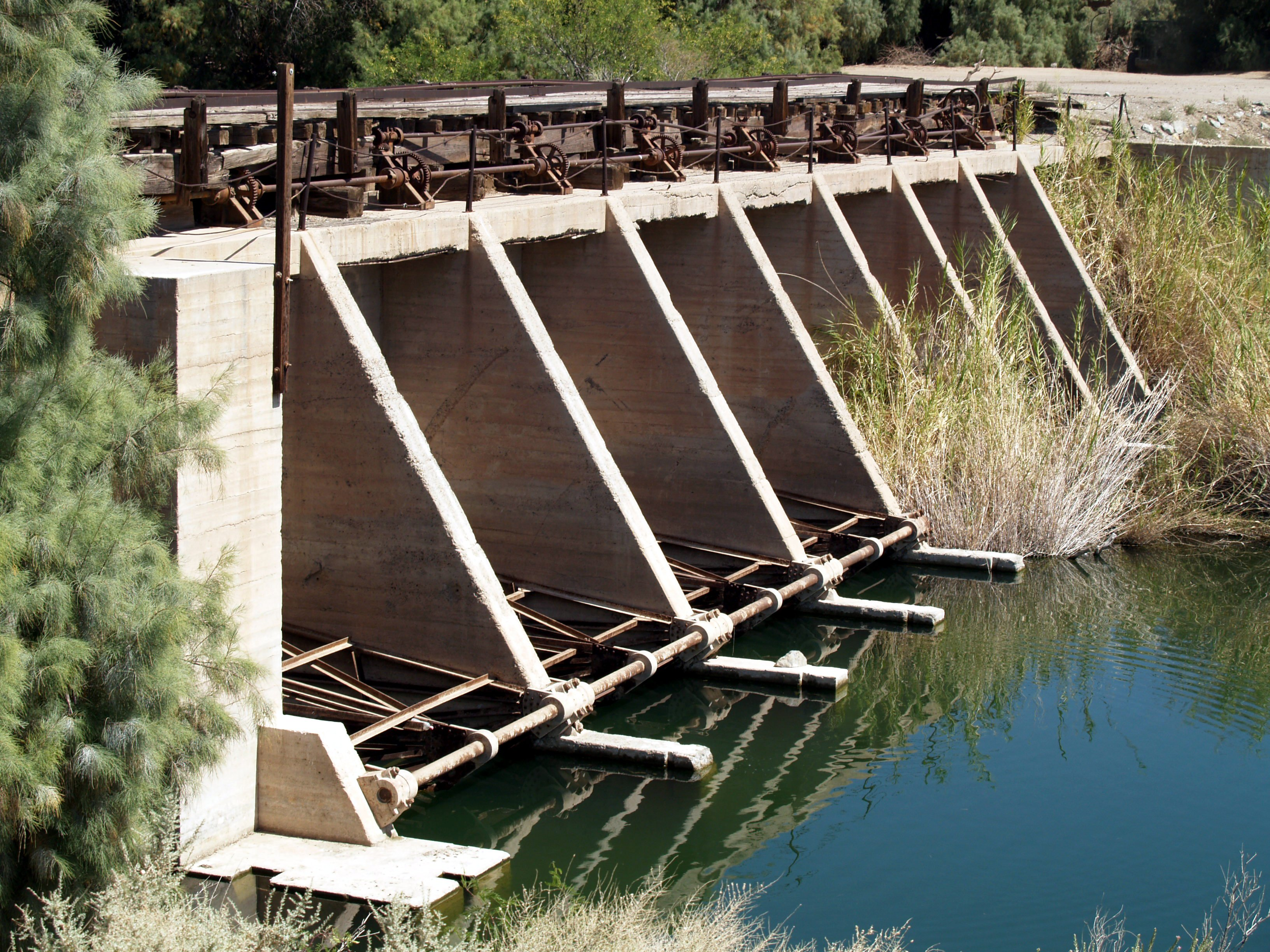
Disused Alamo Canal headgates at Hanlon Heading. The first headgates, known as the Chaffey Gate, were located approximately 100 metres (330 ft) south of this point.

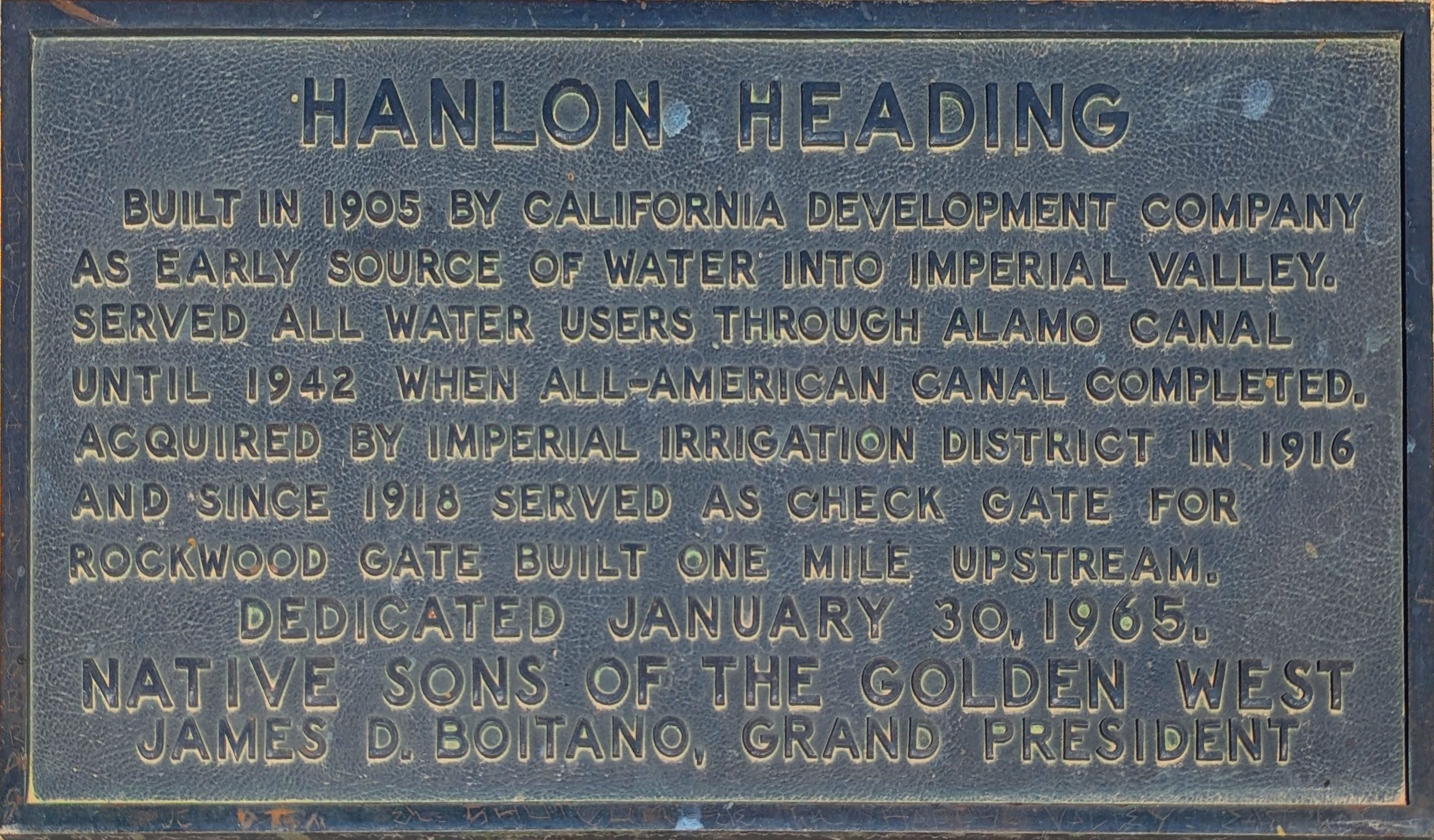
Photo of the 1965 plaque on a rock pedestal in front of the 1905 Hanlon Heading, taken in 2026.

== See also ==
- Colorado River Irrigation Company
- Imperial Land Company
- Morelos Dam
- All-American Canal
- Bee Wash
