= Bee Wash =

Coordinates: 32°47′12″N 114°37′39″W

Bee Wash is an intermittent stream located in the U.S. state of California. It is located in Imperial County.
