= Imperial Dam =

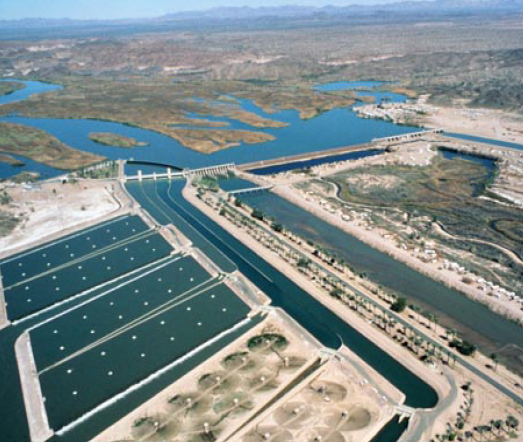

- Location within the United States Location within Arizona
- Official name: Imperial Diversion Dam
- Location: Lower Colorado River Valley; Imperial County, California; Yuma County, Arizona
- Coordinates: 32.883°N 114.465°W
- Construction began: 1936; 90 years ago
- Opening date: 1938; 88 years ago
- Owner: United States Bureau of Reclamation
- Operator: Imperial Irrigation District

Dam and spillways
- Impounds: Colorado River
- Height: 85 ft (26 m)
- Length: 3,475 ft (1,059 m)
- Width (base): 76 ft (23 m)

Reservoir
- Creates: Imperial Reservoir
- Total capacity: 160,000 acre⋅ft (200,000,000 m^{3}) (now silted)
- Surface area: 5,756 acres (2,329 ha)

The Imperial Diversion Dam (National ID # CA10159) is a concrete slab and buttress, ogee weir structure across the California/Arizona border, 18 miles (29 km) northeast of Yuma. Completed in 1938, the dam retains the waters of the Colorado River into the Imperial Reservoir before desilting and diversion into the All-American Canal and the Gila Gravity Main Canal. Between 1932 and 1940, the Imperial Irrigation District (IID) relied on the Inter-California Canal and the Imperial Canal and Alamo River.

== Background ==
The Imperial Dam was built with three sections; the gates of each section hold back the water to help divert the water towards the desilting plant. Three giant desilting basins and seventy-two 770 ft (230 m) scrapers hold and desilt the water; the removed silt is carried away by six sludge-pipes running under the Colorado River that dump the sediment into the California sluiceway, which returns the silt to the Colorado River. The water is now directed back towards one of the three sections which divert the water into one of the three channels. About 90% of the volume of the Colorado River is diverted into the canals at this location. Diversions can top 40,000 cubic feet (1,100 m^{3}) per second, roughly the volume of the Susquehanna River and more than 50 times the flow of the Rio Grande.

The Gila Gravity Main Canal branches off towards Arizona while the All-American Canal branches southwards for 37 miles (60 km) before reaching its headworks on the California border and bends west towards the Imperial Valley.
