= George Chaffey =

Canadian engineer and inventor (1848–1932)

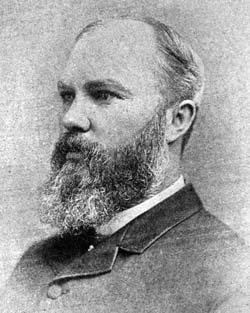
George Chaffey

George Chaffey (28 January 1848 – 1 March 1932) was a Canadian engineer, inventor and entrepreneur who with his brother William developed large parts of Southern California, including what became the community of Etiwanda and the cities of Ontario, and Upland. They undertook similar developments in Australia, which became the city of Mildura, and the town of Renmark and Paringa.

== Biography ==
Chaffey was born in Brockville, Canada West and attended Kingston Grammar School on Lake Ontario. Chaffey's family was of Scottish heritage. Although not interested in schoolroom instruction, he read engineering books from the local library. Chaffey left school at 13 years of age, was fascinated by the shipbuilding yard of his father, and became an apprentice marine engineer in May 1862. By 1880 he was well established as a designer of ships for Great Lakes traffic. While visiting his father in California that year, however, he became interested in the Riverside irrigation colony. By 1886 he and his brother William had established the irrigation colonies of Etiwanda, Ontario, and Upland, which were extremely successful, thanks in large part to innovative features such as hydroelectric systems using mountain water, mutual water companies which eliminated disputes over water, and their creation and endowment of the Chaffey College of Agriculture. George's innovative electrical system at Etiwanda led Los Angeles to hire him to install its first streetlights. He eventually became president and engineer of the Los Angeles Electric Company.

In 1886, at the invitation of the South Australian and Victorian colonial governments, the Chaffeys undertook several irrigation projects in Australia, establishing colonies at Renmark and then Mildura. Though the Chaffeys appointed Herbert Jones to lecture on the Mildura project 'throughout the colonies', using lantern slides from J. W. Lindt's photographs, they were financial failures, and George Chaffey returned to California. William remained in Mildura, which eventually became successful. Later, George joined the California Development Company as chief engineer and undertook a project to irrigate the Colorado Desert. The Colorado Desert was renamed by the Canadian party and is now known as the Imperial Valley. Chaffey along with the other pioneers believed this name would bring more people to this southeastern part of California.

In 1905, Chaffey purchased the ranch of John Shepherd at Manzanar, California, located in California's Owens Valley. Chaffey subdivided the ranch, along with other adjacent ranches, and founded the town of Manzanar in 1910. Chaffey's Owens Valley Improvement Company built an irrigation system and planted thousands of fruit trees, and by 1920, the town had more than twenty-five homes, a two-room school, a town hall, and a general store. Also at that time, nearly 5,000 acres (2,023 ha) of apple, pear, and peach trees were being grown, along with grapes, prunes, potatoes, corn, alfalfa and large vegetable and flower gardens.

In 1912, Chaffey moved to Whittier, California, joining his son John, where he lived for a number of years while tending to his invalid wife Ann. Chaffey later retired to San Diego, California. He died in Ontario, California, on 1 March 1932 at age 84, and was buried at Bellevue Memorial Park in Ontario. A mural in his honor is featured inside terminal 4 at Ontario International Airport.

Statue of George Chaffey in front of the Upland civic center

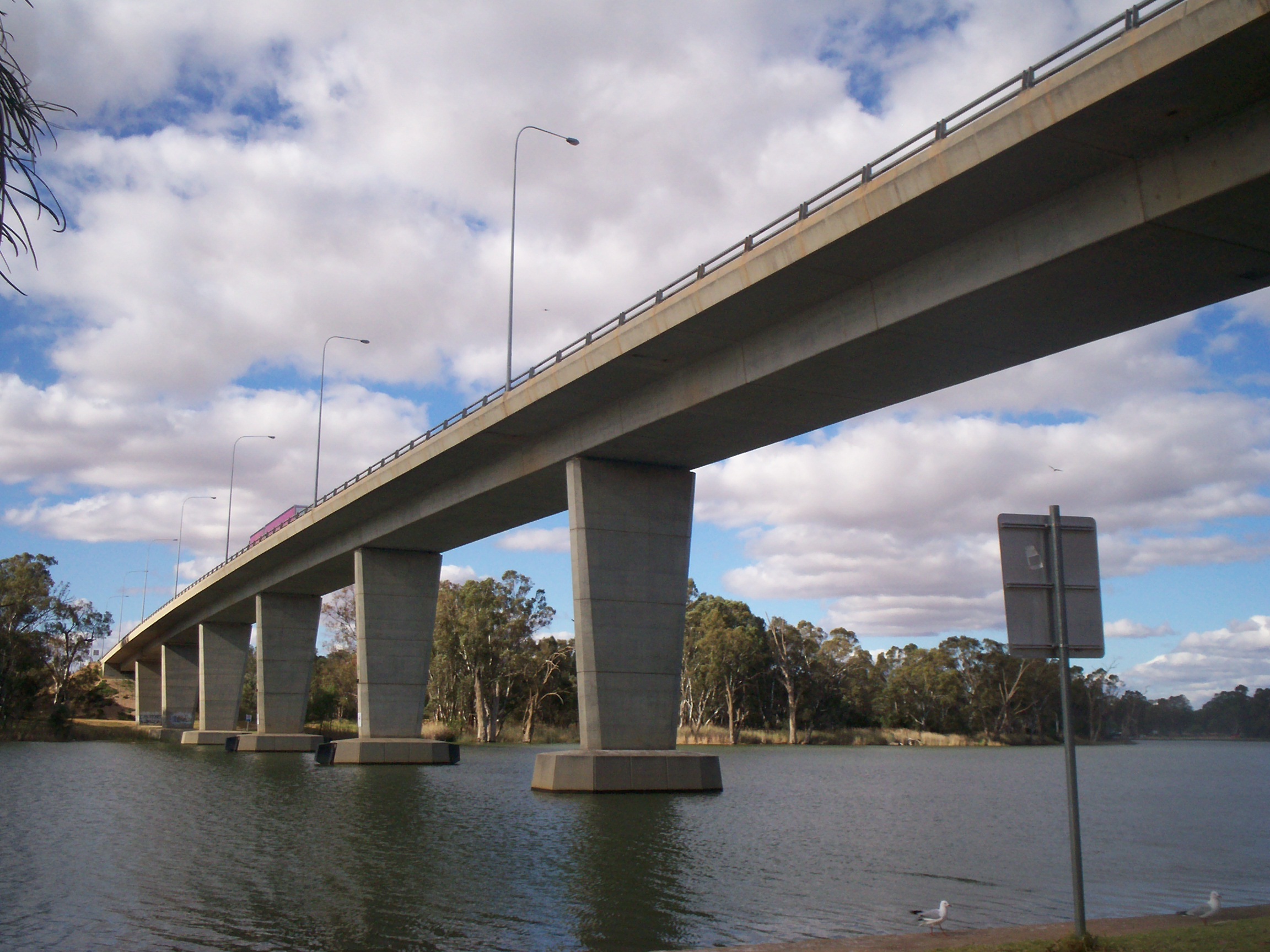
George Chaffey Bridge over Murray River, Mildura

== See also ==
- Alamo Canal
- California Development Company
- Imperial Land Company
- Salton Sea
- Ben Chaffey, his son

== Sources ==
- www.chaffey.org, article by Robert E. Ellingwood and Marie Boyd
- Ontario Heritage Foundation
- Government of Canada digital collections
