= California Development Company =

The California Development Company was formed in 1896 to build an irrigation system for the lower Colorado Desert in California. It constructed the Imperial Canal for that purpose in 1901. In 1905, heavy rainfall caused the canal system to fail leading to the creation of the Salton Sea.

== History ==
The California Development Company was formed in 1896 by Charles Robinson Rockwood as a replacement for the defunct Colorado River Irrigation Company, which had been started a few years earlier for the purpose of planning an irrigation system for the lower Colorado Desert in California.

The rich, silty soil of the area was found to be suitable for agriculture, but wells tapping groundwater brought up an inadequate supply of water for such a hot, arid region. The California Development Company took over the project of diverting Colorado River water into the Coachella and Imperial Valleys in the Salton Sink, a dry lake bed which today contains the Salton Sea, hoping to turn the desert green with agricultural fields.

The company was financially troubled until engineer George Chaffey was convinced to join in 1900. The first canals were being constructed by 1900 under the guidance of Chaffey. Chaffey also created the Imperial Land Company to encourage colonization of the area. After a dispute with Rockwood, Chaffey sold his share in the California Development Company in 1902.

The Imperial Canal was completed within two years. It received water from the Colorado River, which, by the time it had flowed to the Imperial Valley, contained massive amounts of silt. The Imperial Canal filled with silt at an alarming pace. While attempts were made to create a diversion around the silt blockages, winter flooding in 1905 tumbled the diversion canal. The whole of the Colorado River poured into the Salton Sink, forming the Salton Sea. The area was a scene of flood for two years until the canal breach was mended. As the waters dried up, the Salton Sea was reduced in size, but it is still the largest lake in California.

The California Development Company was financially strained by this point, and in fact relied upon a financial loan and physical assistance from Southern Pacific Railroad to mend the broken canal. Ultimately, this "financial assistance" resulted in the Southern Pacific Company obtaining a legal judgment against the California Development Company entered in the Superior Court of California in and for the County of Los Angeles on December 30, 1909, in the amount of $1,279,865.77, an enormous sum at the time equivalent to $45.9 million today. A legal judgment had already been entered against the California Development Company in favor of the New Liverpool Salt Company on January 10, 1908, in the amount of $458,246.23 (equivalent to $16.4 million today) with interest to accrue from that date, to compensate the salt company for the value of its destroyed property, basing its claim upon the alleged negligent action of the California Development Company in cutting the bank of the Colorado River and thus permitting the flow of water into the former Salton Sink destroying its lands.

The costs of the broken structure, as well as from lawsuits over the disaster, made the California Development Company a lost cause. The project of irrigating the valley was assumed by the new Imperial Irrigation District in 1911.

An expansive recounting of the rise and fall of the California Development Company appears in a lengthy legal decision issued by the Supreme Court of California on October 9, 1915. There are no less than eight judicial decisions involving this case that were published by the California Supreme Court between March 13, 1911, and February 13, 1919.

== See also ==
- Alamo Canal
- Colorado River
- Imperial Land Company
- Imperial Valley
- Salton Sea
- Salton Sink
