= Morelos Dam =

1950 dam across the Colorado River

- Interactive map of Morelos Dam
- Coordinates: 32°42′20″N 114°43′45″W

The Morelos Dam was built in 1950 across the Colorado River following a 1944 treaty between the United States and Mexico. It is located about 1 mile (1.6 km) below the junction of the California border and the Colorado River between the town of Los Algodones, Baja California, in northwestern Mexico and Yuma County, Arizona in the southwestern United States. The eastern half of the dam lies inside United States territory; but Mexico is responsible for all maintenance. The dam allows Mexico to divert its allotted water from the Colorado River to highly developed crop lands in the Mexicali, Mexico Valley. The Morelos Dam is the final dam on the Colorado River. It is run by the International Boundary and Water Commission (IBWC).

On March 23, 2014, an eight-week flood was begun with the opening of a gate at Morelos Dam. The goal is to rejuvenate a desert riparian habitat which naturalist Aldo Leopold explored in 1922 and described as "awesome jungles" and "lovely groves" in his memoir A Sand County Almanac.

The dam is noted as the location Chris McCandless crossed into Mexico by kayak.
