= Pilot Knob (Imperial County, California) =

Volcanic plug in Imperial County, California, United States

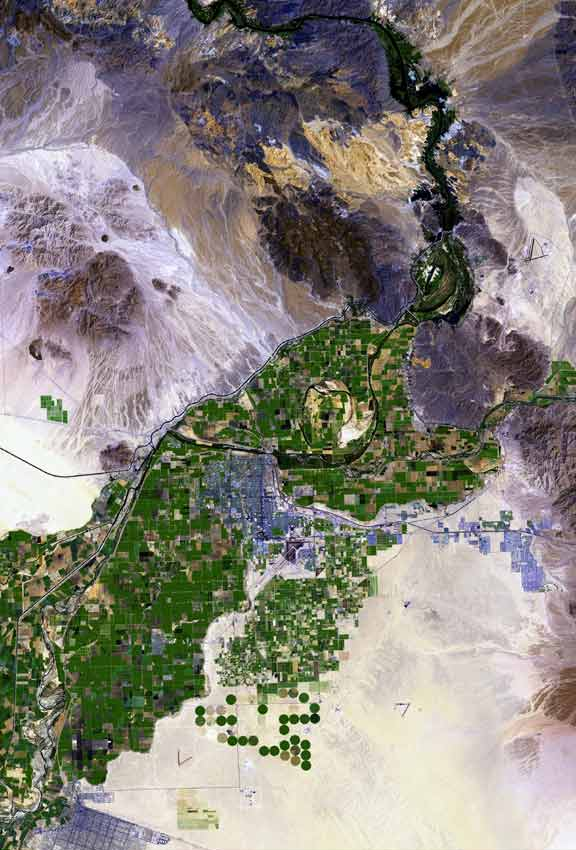
- (at center-left); The Cargo Muchacho Mountains surrounded by alluvial fans. The small outlier "small mountain peak", due-south, is Pilot Knob. (The line appearing adjacent, is the All American Canal to the El Centro agriculture region.)

Highest point
- Elevation: 876 ft (267 m) NAVD 88
- Coordinates: 32°43′54″N 114°45′00″W

Geography
- Location within California Location within Arizona Location within Baja California
- Location: Imperial County, California. U.S.
- Topo map: USGS Yuma West

Geology
- Mountain type: Volcanic plug

Pilot Knob (also, Avie Quah-la-Altwa, Ha-bee-co-la-la, and San Pablo) is a peak in Imperial County, California. Pilot Knob is located 8 miles (13 km) southeast of Ogilby, It rises to an elevation of 876 feet (267 m). Pilot Knob is a rocky landform, geologically a Volcanic plug, west of Yuma, Arizona–Winterhaven, California; it is connected to the Cargo Muchacho Mountains, the central portion of the mountains being about 7 miles (11 km) north. Pilot Knob was named for its prominence as a landmark for riverboat traffic in the 19th-20th centuries on the Colorado River which borders Winterhaven–Yuma. Pilot Knob is an Area of Critical Environmental Concern administered by the Bureau of Land Management.

== Pilot Knob description ==
Separated from the center of the Cargo Muchacho Mountains by 7 mi, the volcanic landform is at the base of alluvial fans. Pilot Knob has a height of 897 feet (273 m), and the entire mountain block is about 2 x 2 mi. The mountain has a rock quarry on its north side, visible from Interstate 8.

== Access to Pilot Knob ==
Pilot Knob is accessed from Interstate 8, the landform being east of the Algodones Dunes and east of El Centro, California in southeastern Imperial County. The All American Canal is cut from the south border of Pilot Knob, and can be seen in aerial views traversing the Algodones Dunes to the west.

The Bureau of Land Management administers the Pilot Knob Long Term Visitor Area campground at the base of Pilot Knob.

== History ==
When Juan Bautista de Anza sighted the peak in 1774 he named it Cerro de San Pablo. The Saint Thomas Yuma Indian Mission was located 8 miles (13 km) to the east. During the California Gold Rush, Pilot Knob was the landmark on the Southern Emigrant Trail for what was called Emigrant Crossing, the center crossing of three major crossings of the Colorado River in the vicinity of what is now Yuma, Arizona. The Butterfield Overland Mail located its Pilot Knob Station, near the river and the Knob in 1858.

The Alamo Canal intake was placed at Pilot Knob due to the availability of a solid rock foundation for the head gate.

KIVA (TV) Yuma, Arizona transmitted from Pilot Knob from 1953 to 1970.
