= Imperial Irrigation District =

Imperial Valley, California, water and power public utility

District overview
- Formed: 1911
- Preceding District: California Development Company
- Type: Irrigation district
- Headquarters: Imperial, California
- Website: www.iid.com

The Imperial Irrigation District (IID) is an irrigation district that serves the Imperial Valley and a large portion of the eastern and southern Coachella Valley in the Colorado Desert region of Southern California. Established under the State Water Code, the IID supplies roughly 500,000 acres (200,000 ha) of Imperial Valley farmland with raw Colorado River water to support irrigation. IID also supplies electrical energy to the Imperial and Coachella valleys.

IID was formed in 1911 under the California Irrigation District Act to acquire the properties of the bankrupt California Development Company and its Mexican subsidiary. The IID was formed as a public agency, acquiring 13 mutual water companies in the valley which had developed and operated water distribution canals. The district is headquartered in Imperial, California.

The IID is a key partner in the Quantification Settlement Agreement—a pack of several agreements among California water districts entered into in 2003 to help California live within its entitlement of 4.4 million acre-feet of Colorado River water a year. Water conserved through conservation projects under the QSA is made available for the Southern California Coastal communities (San Diego County Water Authority, Coachella Valley Water District and Metropolitan Water District of Southern California).

== Facilities ==
Prior to 1942, irrigation water delivered to the Imperial Valley was diverted from the Colorado River near Pilot Knob through Mexico to bypass the Imperial sand dunes west of Yuma and into the IID-operated Alamo Canal (also known as the Imperial Canal). Since 1942, water has been diverted at Imperial Dam on the Colorado River through the 82-mile All-American Canal, all of which the IID operates and maintains, although the structures are owned by the U.S. Bureau of Reclamation.

Water from Imperial Dam serves the Yuma, Ariz. region as well as the Imperial Valley. The All-American Canal also delivers water from the dam to the Coachella turnout—a section east of Yuma that diverts water to the Coachella Valley Water District. Imperial Dam, located about 20 miles north of Yuma, contains four desilting basins which help remove silt and sediment from the river water so it can be delivered by gravity flow. The IID also remotely operates the Brock Reservoir, between El Centro and Yuma, by operating the inlet and outlet gates and regulating the amount of water diverted into the reservoir and returned to the main system.

IID's Energy Department provides electric power to more than 145,000 customers in the Imperial Valley and parts of Riverside and San Diego counties. Service to residents of the Imperial Valley and Coachella valleys includes the Imperial Valley cities of El Centro, Calexico, Holtville, Brawley and Coachella Valley cities including Mecca, Thermal, La Quinta, Coachella and Indio, Bermuda Dunes, Thousand Palms, Indio Hills and Sky Valley. As the third largest public power utility in California, IID controls more than 1,100 megawatts of power derived from a diverse resource portfolio that includes its own generation, and long- and short-term power purchases.

Located in what's been referred to as the "renewable energy capital of the world", IID serves as a catalyst for renewable energy development in the Imperial Valley and is going to great lengths to enhance its energy infrastructure to be able to move renewable energy generated in the Imperial Valley to markets far and wide. The Energy Department has an aggressive transmission expansion plan and, over the next five years, intends to invest $1 billion in its energy infrastructure, which includes building a state-of-the-art energy battery storage unit in El Centro, which would provide backup energy resources but also help the IID grid integrate the many megawatts of solar energy entering the IID grid during the day.

== Salton Sea ==
Under the nation's largest ag-to-urban water conservation transfer agreement (called the Quantification Settlement Agreement, a series of pacts between California water districts to help California live within its 4.4 million acre-foot entitlement right of Colorado River water), since 2003 water was released to the Salton Sea to mitigate negative environmental impacts. The agreement calls for this for the first 15 years of the water transfer. (Water conserved on Imperial Valley farms and in the IID water delivery system is provided to Southern California coastal communities—specifically the San Diego County Water Authority, the Coachella Valley Water District and the Metropolitan Water District of Southern California). This flow of mitigation water to the sea ended on December 31, 2017. The State of California has not lived up to its obligation to develop a restoration plan for the sea.

In 2009 under the agreement, IID completed the 23-mile concrete lining project of the All-American Canal to recover about 66,700 acre-feet of water per year for use by the San Diego County Water Authority.

Because the declining Salton Sea poses a serious public health crisis to the residents living in the Imperial and Coachella Valleys (as dried shoreline soil and sediments, saturated with agricultural chemicals, will be spread by dust emissions from strong winds), IID has petitioned California State Water Resources Control Board asking that this governing board initiate negotiations between the QSA parties and the state to develop a plan to restore the sea, meeting the state's obligation.

Pacific Institute, an Oakland-based environmental think tank, had issued a report stating that the lack of replenishment water to the sea was leading to a "period of very rapid deterioration." With the increased shrinkage, they predicted that dust storms would increase and a rotten-egg smell could reach to the coastal cities.

== Incidents ==
On Sept. 8, 2011, an estimated 5 million people suffered a temporary loss of electricity from Arizona to San Diego and into parts of Mexico. All utilities involved in providing energy to the affected areas were investigated by NERC and FERC. While not admitting any wrongdoing, in 2014 IID agreed to a $12 million settlement with the Federal Energy Regulatory Commission, bringing to a close the federal probe into the events surrounding the outage. Most of the money IID had been fined ($9 million) will be directly invested into the IID electric system to strengthen and enhance its system.

The district has committed to a number of physical improvements that will result in a stronger system and, in combination with the Strategic Transmission Expansion Plan, which is under consideration by the California Energy Commission, will provide greater export of renewable energy capability to the larger western grid.

== Current events ==
In late 2025, $18 million of funding for repairs and upgrades of the Imperial Irrigation District power grid was canceled by the second Trump administration. No specific reason was given, but the cancellation was part of a pattern of withholding funds for various kinds of programs, including those related to renewable energy. The district had intended to use the funding to overhaul electrical grids and make them more resilient to storm damage.

== Management ==
IID is led by an elected five-member board of directors who represent divisions in the water service area.

IID is advised by the public through citizen cooperation on the Water Conservation Advisory Board and the Energy Consumers Advisory Board. ECAC consists of representatives of both the Imperial and Coachella valley served by the Energy Department.

== See also ==
- Colorado River Irrigation Company
- Imperial Land Company
