= Imperial Land Company =

The Imperial Land Company was a land colonization company incorporated in California in March, 1900 for the purpose of encouraging settlement of the Imperial Valley thus providing customers for the California Development Company. Imperial Land was formed by George Chaffey and several other individuals associated with the California Development Company.

The company laid out the California towns of Calexico, Heber, Imperial and Brawley, as well as Mexicali in Mexico, and gave its name to Imperial County. The Imperial Land Company was not a subsidiary of the California Development Company, but rather a separate corporate entity.

== See also ==
- Alamo Canal
- Imperial Irrigation District
