= Colorado Desert =

Subdivision of the Sonoran Desert, California

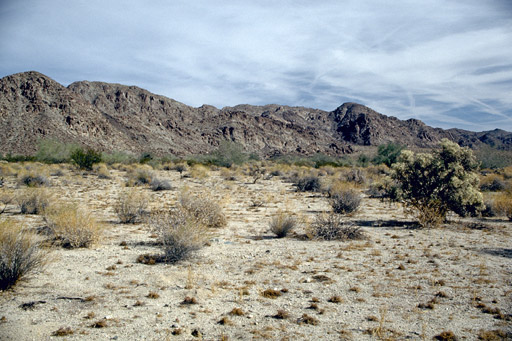
- Colorado Desert landscape

- Location within California Location within the United States
- Location: Sonora Desert

The Colorado Desert is a part of the larger Sonoran Desert located in California, United States, and Baja California, Mexico. It encompasses approximately 7 million acres (2,800,000 ha; 28,000 km^{2}), including the heavily irrigated Coachella, Imperial and Mexicali valleys. It is home to many unique flora and fauna.

== Geography and geology ==
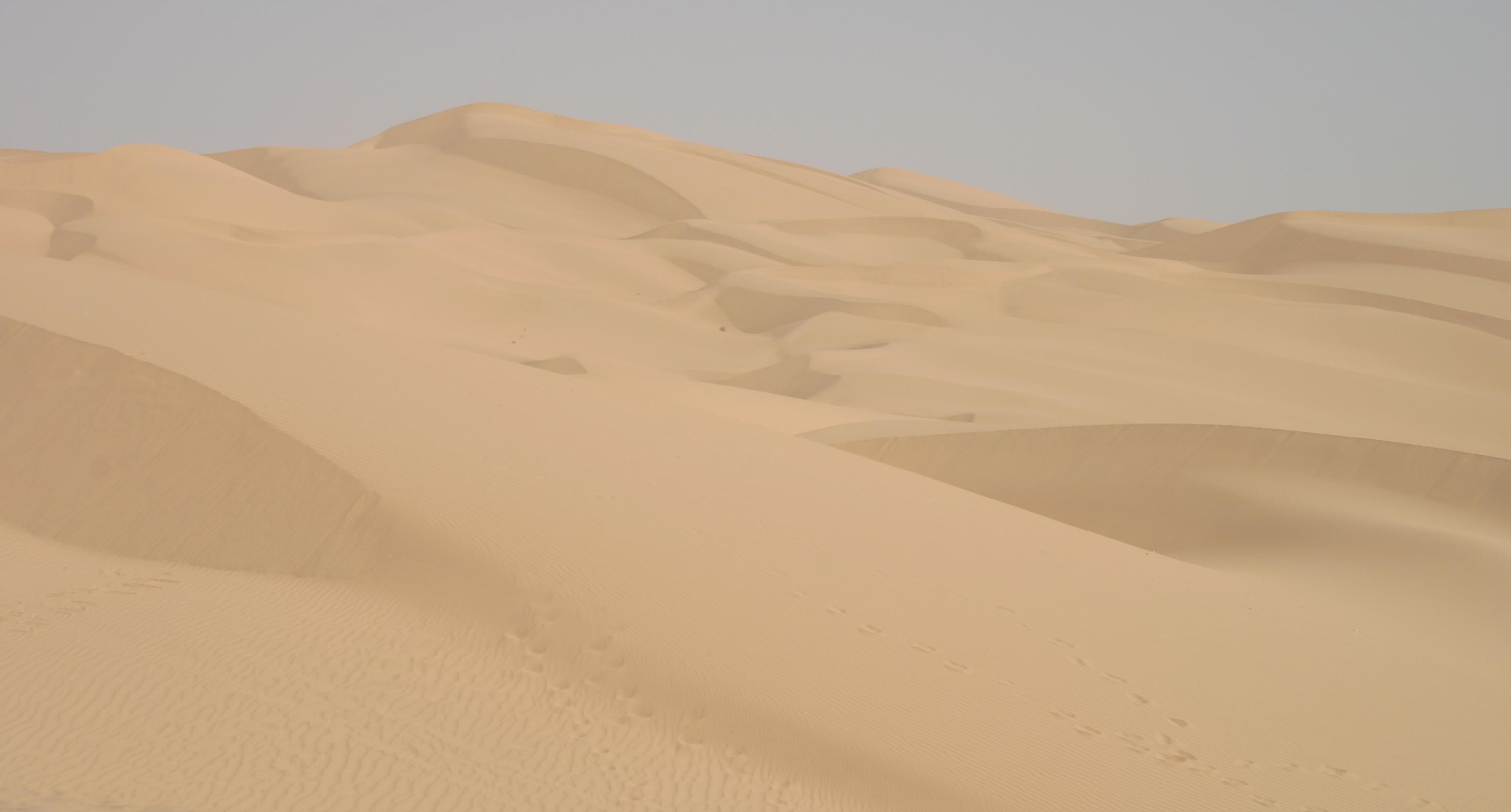
The Algodones Dunes

The Colorado Desert is a subregion of the larger Sonoran Desert, covering about 7 million acres (2.8 million ha; 28,000 km^{2}). The desert occupies Imperial County, parts of San Diego and Riverside counties, and a small part of San Bernardino County in California, United States, as well as the northern part of Mexicali Municipality and a small eastern part of Tecate Municipality in Baja California, Mexico.

Most of the Colorado Desert lies at a relatively low elevation, below 1,000 ft (305 m), with the lowest point of the desert floor at 275 ft (84 m) below sea level, at the Salton Sea. Although the highest peaks of the Peninsular Ranges reach elevations of nearly 10,000 ft (3,048 m), most of the region's mountains do not exceed 3,000 ft (914 m).

In this region, the geology is dominated by the transition of the tectonic plate boundary from rift to fault. The southernmost strands of the San Andreas Fault connect to the northernmost extensions of the East Pacific Rise. Consequently, the region is subject to earthquakes, and the crust is being stretched, which will result in a sinking of the terrain over time.

== Climate ==
The Colorado Desert's climate distinguishes it from other deserts. The region experiences greater summer daytime temperatures than higher-elevation deserts and almost never experiences frost. In addition, the Colorado Desert experiences two rainy seasons per year (in the winter and late summer), especially toward the southern portion of the region; the more northerly Mojave Desert usually has only winter rains.

The west coast Peninsular Ranges, or other west ranges, of Southern California–northern Baja California, block most eastern Pacific coastal air and rains, producing an arid climate. Other short or longer-term weather events can move in from the Gulf of California to the south, and are often active in the summer monsoons. These include remnants of Pacific hurricanes, storms from the southern tropical jetstream, and the northern Intertropical Convergence Zone.

== Flora and fauna ==
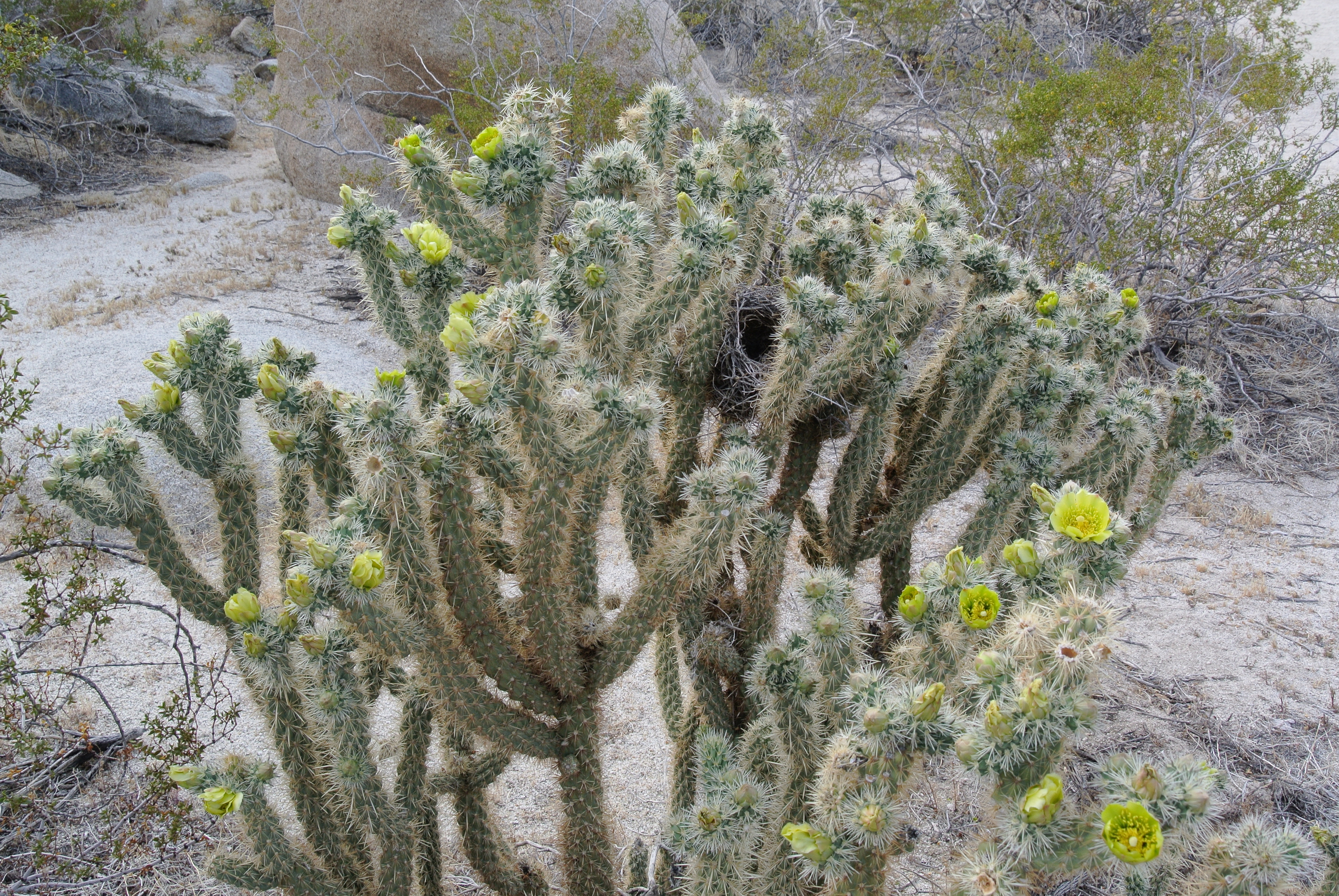
Blooming cholla cactus with bird's nest in Anza Borrego Desert State Park

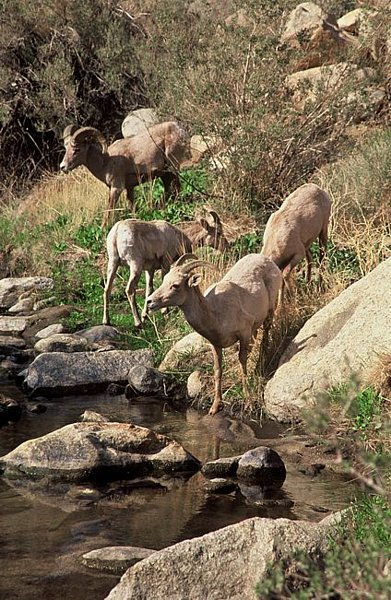
Bighorn sheep at Palm Canyon in Anza-Borrego State Park

The region's terrestrial habitats include creosote bush scrub; mixed scrub, including yucca and cholla cactus; desert saltbush; sandy soil grasslands; and desert dunes. Higher elevations are dominated by pinyon pine and California juniper, with areas of manzanita and Coulter pine. In addition to hardy perennials, more than half of the desert's plant species are herbaceous annuals, and appropriately timed winter rains produce abundant early spring wildflowers. In the southern portion of the region, the additional moisture supplied by summer rainfall fosters the germination of summer annual plants and supports smoketree, ironwood, and palo verde trees.

Common desert wildlife include mule deer, bobcat, desert kangaroo rat, cactus mouse, black-tailed jackrabbit, Gambel's quail, and red-diamond rattlesnake. Among sensitive species are flat-tailed horned lizard, Coachella Valley fringe-toed lizard, desert tortoise, prairie falcon, Andrews' dune scarab beetle, peninsular bighorn sheep, and California leaf-nosed bat. The best place to spot wildlife is at the wetland refuges along the Colorado River, Cibola National Wildlife Refuge and Imperial National Wildlife Refuge.

In the Colorado Desert's arid environment, aquatic and wetland habitats are limited in extent but are critically important to wildlife. Runoff from seasonal rains and groundwater springs forms desert arroyos, desert fan palm oases, freshwater marshes, brine lakes, desert washes, ephemeral and perennial streams, and desert riparian vegetation communities dominated by cottonwood, willow, and non-native tamarisk. Two of the region's most significant aquatic systems are the Salton Sea and the Colorado River. While most desert wildlife depend on aquatic habitats as water sources, a number of species, such as the arroyo toad, desert pupfish, Yuma rail, and southwestern willow flycatcher, are restricted to these habitats. In some places, summer rains produce short-lived seasonal pools that host uncommon species like Couch's spadefoot toad.

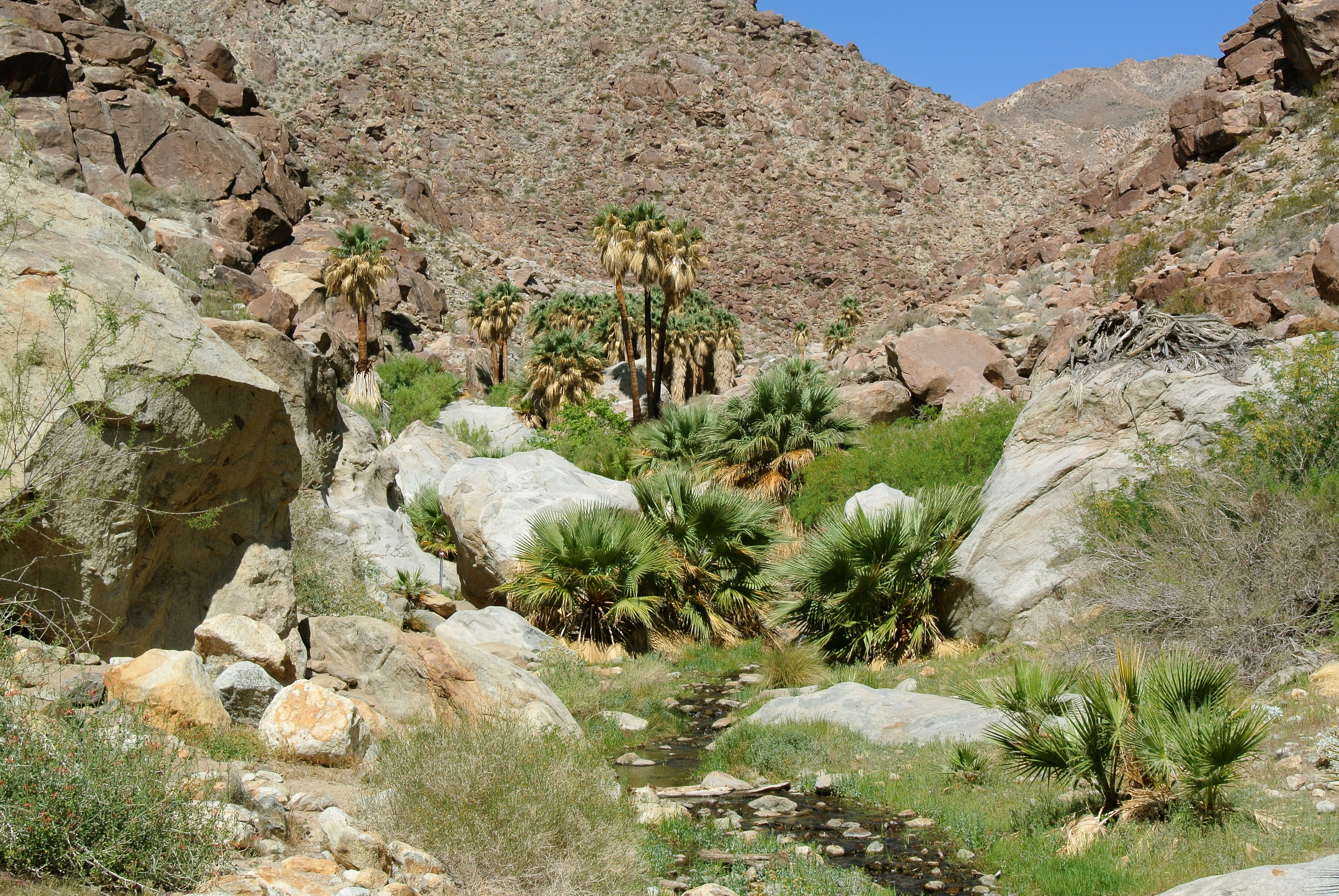
Washingtonia filifera in Anza Borrego Desert State Park

Desert fan palm oases are rare ecological communities found only in the Colorado Desert. They occur only where permanent water sources are available, such as at springs or along fault lines, where groundwater is forced to the surface by the movement of hard impermeable rock, and can be found in the San Jacinto, Santa Rosa, and Little San Bernardino mountains, in the canyons of Anza-Borrego Desert State Park, and along the San Andreas Fault in the Coachella Valley. The only palm native to California, Washingtonia filifera (desert fan palm), grows at the oases.

=== Endemic flora ===
Some sub-regions of the Colorado Desert contain endemic flora. Along the Lower Colorado River Valley, in-flow side canyons, flatlands, or low-to-higher level elevations, at least one such plants occur: Salvia greatae (Orocopia sage).

== National and State Parks ==
- Joshua Tree National Park
- Chuckwalla National Monument
- Imperial NWR
- Sonny Bono Salton Sea NWR
- Indio Hills Palms
- Anza-Borrego Desert State Park
- Ocotillo Wells State Vehicular Recreation Area
- Picacho State Recreation Area
- Heber Dunes State Vehicular Recreation Area
- Salton Sea State Recreation Area

== Environmental issues ==
The Colorado Desert is one of the least-populous regions in California, but human activities have had substantial impacts on the region's habitats and wildlife. Many unique communities, particularly aquatic and dune systems, are limited in distribution and separated by vast expanses of inhospitable, arid desert terrain. Even limited human disturbances can have markedly deleterious effects on the endemic and sensitive species supported by these unique regional systems.

Some of the greatest human-caused effects on the region have resulted from the water diversions and flood control measures along the Colorado River. These measures have dramatically altered the region's hydrology by redistributing the region's water supply to large expanses of irrigated agriculture and metropolitan coastal areas such as Los Angeles and San Diego. The once-dynamic Salton Sea and Colorado River ecosystems are now controlled by human water management. Because of the scarcity of water resources in the desert environment, these alterations have had substantial impacts on regional wildlife and habitats. In addition, portions of the region are experiencing substantial growth and development pressures, most notably the Coachella Valley.

== See also ==
- Yuma Desert
- Chihuahuan Desert
- The Low Desert region
- Deserts of California
- List of North American deserts
- List of lakes of the Colorado Desert
