= Imperial Valley =

Valley in California, United States

Imperial Valley Spanish: Valle Imperial
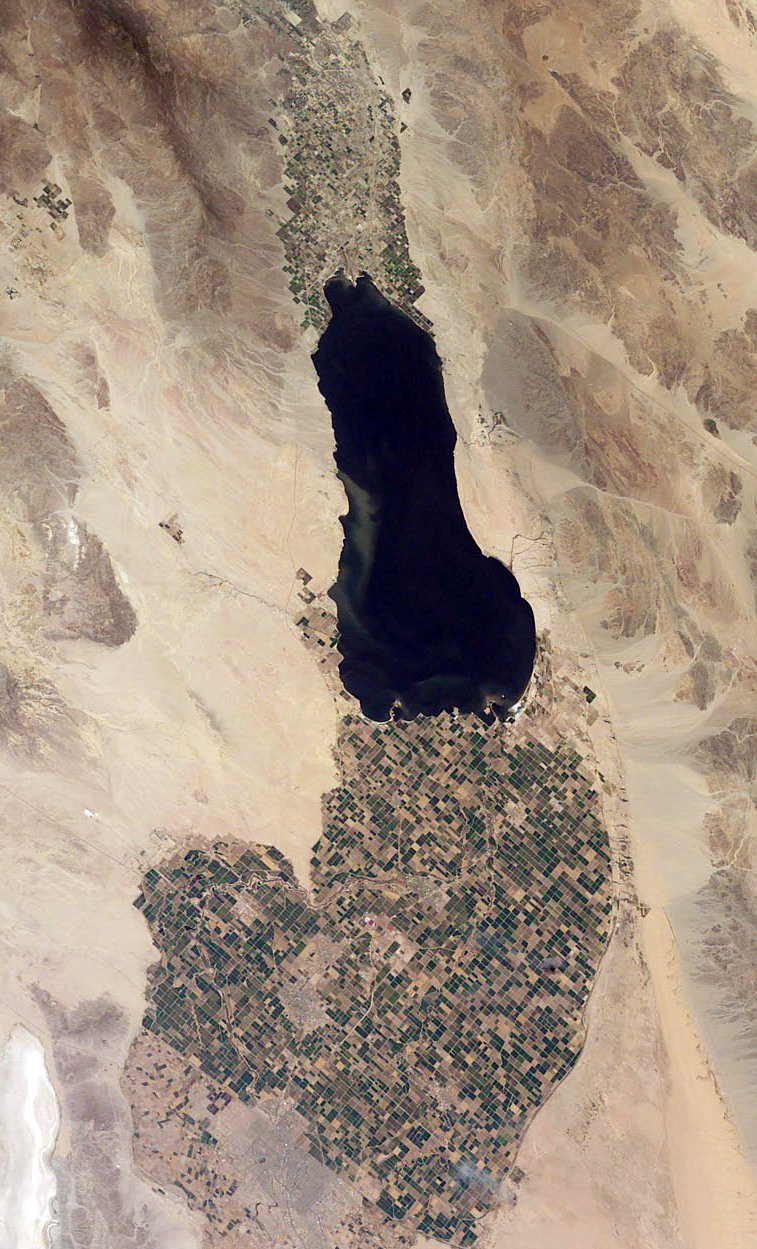
- The Imperial Valley below the Salton Sea. The US–Mexican border runs diagonally across the lower left of the image.

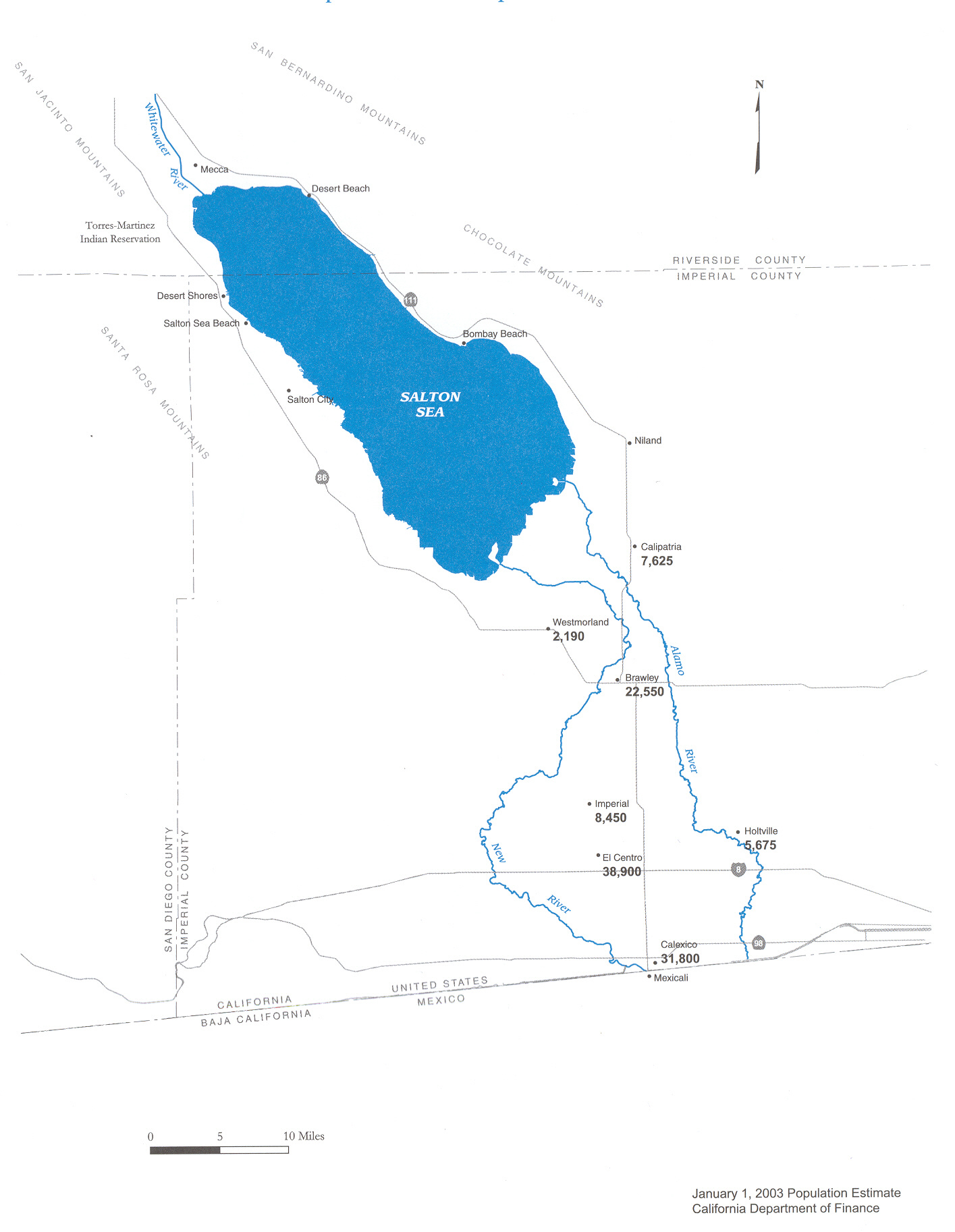
- Map of Imperial Valley
- Length: 50 miles (80 km) Northwest-Southeast

Geography
- Location: California, United States
- Population centers: Brawley, Calexico, El Centro, Imperial
- Coordinates: 32°44′51″N 114°57′48″W
- Traversed by: Interstate 8, State Route 78, State Route 86, State Route 111

The Imperial Valley (Spanish: Valle de Imperial or Valle Imperial) of Southern California lies in Imperial and Riverside counties, with an urban area centered on the city of El Centro. The Valley is bordered by the Colorado River to the east and, in part, the Salton Sea to the west. Farther west lies the San Diego and Imperial County border. To the north is the Coachella Valley region of Riverside County, which together with Imperial Valley form the Salton Trough, or the Cahuilla Basin, also the county line of Imperial and Riverside counties, and to the south the international boundary with Mexico.

The culture of the area blends those of the United States and Mexico, due to its regional history and geographic location along the international border. The Imperial Valley economy is based on agriculture.

Imperial Valley was named by the Imperial Land Company, in the hopes of attracting settlers. It is now the home of the El Centro metropolitan area. Locally, the terms "Imperial Valley" and "Imperial County" are used synonymously. Imperial Valley is also called Lithium Valley, because of its rich supply of lithium, used to power electric vehicles, cameras, etc.

== Geography ==
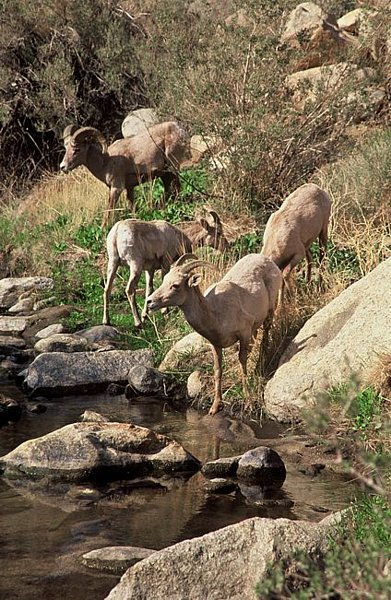
Bighorns in Anza-Borrego

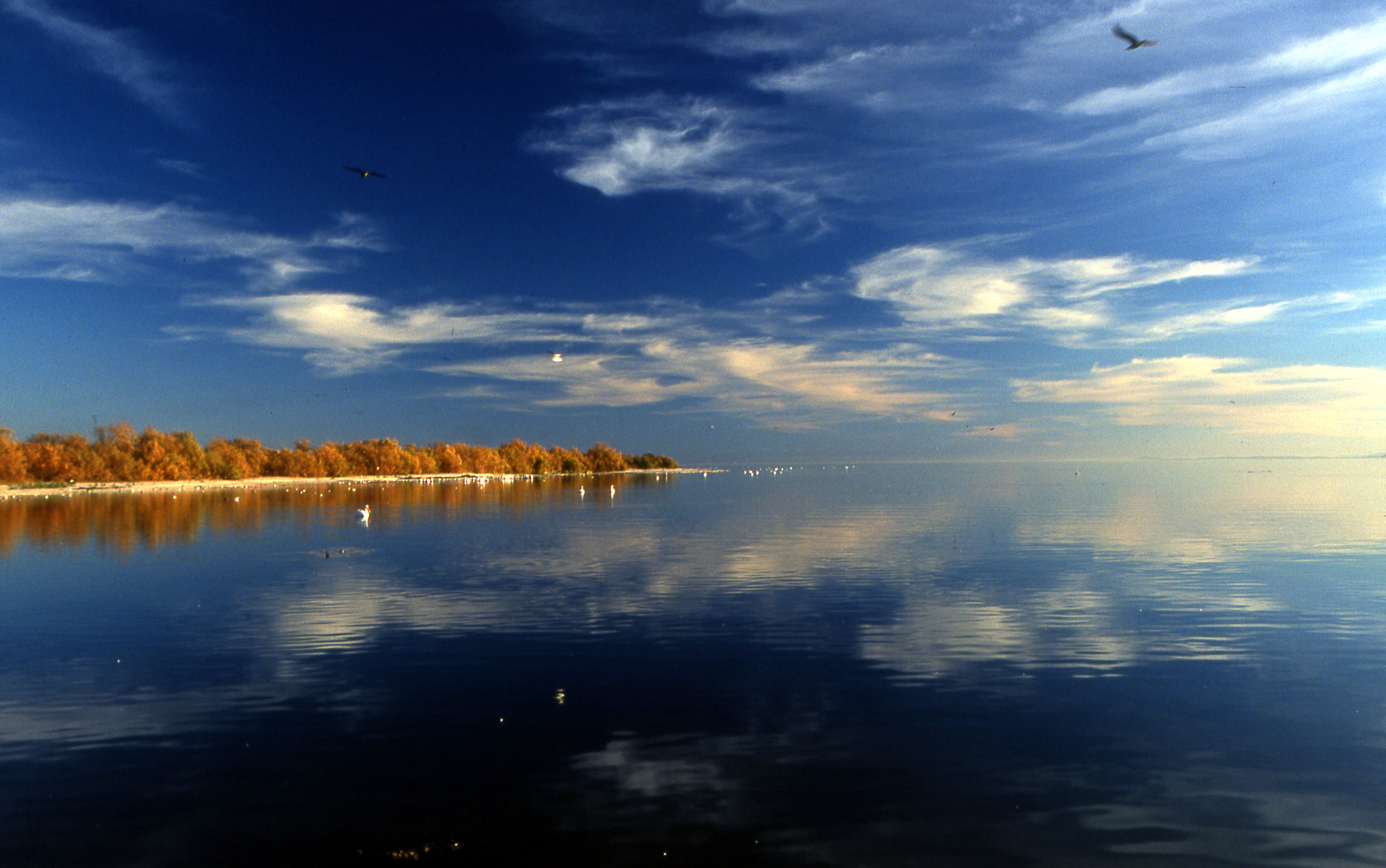
Salton Sea

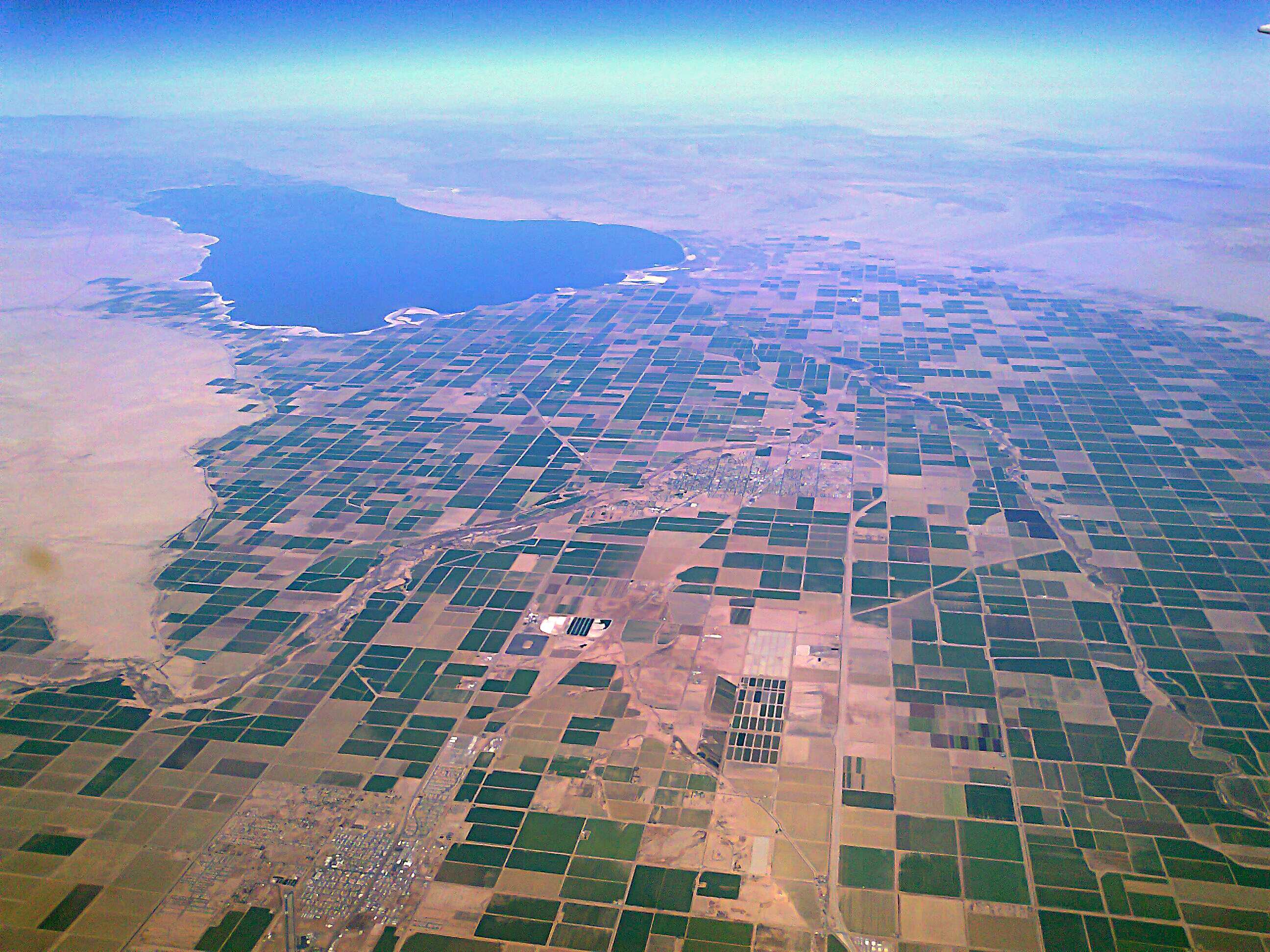
Aerial view of Imperial Valley and Salton Sea

The Imperial Valley extends southward for 50 miles (80 km) from the southern end of the Salton Sea into Mexico. Part of a trough stretching from the Coachella Valley to the Gulf of California, it is almost entirely below sea level—235 feet (72 m) below at the edge of the Salton Sea. Its hot desert climate is characterized by daily temperature extremes. It was once part of the Gulf of California, from which it was cut off by the dam-like deposits of the Colorado River Delta Fan as it carved out the Grand Canyon. Bordered by sand dunes and barren mountains, it was uninhabited until 1901, when the Imperial Canal was opened and diverted Colorado River water into the valley through Mexico. Floodwaters in 1905–07 destroyed the irrigation channels and created the Salton Sea now filled by the New River and irrigation run-off. The rivers in the southern part of the Salton Sea river basin flow south to north.

The valley is bordered by the Colorado River to the east and, in part, the Salton Sea to the west. Farther west lies the border with San Diego County and to the south the international boundary between the US state of California and Baja California, Mexico. To the north is the boundary with Riverside County and the Coachella Valley, which with the Imperial Valley form the "Cahuilla Basin" or the "Salton Trough".

El Centro is the largest industrial center of the Imperial Valley, being the center of shipping exports as well as being home to retail, transportation, wholesale, and agricultural industries. There are also two international border crossings nearby for commercial and noncommercial vehicles. The city's population was 42,598 at the 2010 census and 44,322 at the 2020 census. The city is 50 feet (20 m) below sea level and the largest city in the United States below sea level. Fifty percent of the jobs in El Centro come from the service and retail sector.

=== Climate ===
The Imperial Valley often has summer temperatures well over 100 °F (38 °C), but from late October until mid-April the temperature is relatively mild and sometimes low. During winter months the Valley averages more than eight hours of sunshine a day, receiving the most sunlight of any place in the United States.

Historically, the lowest minimum temperature ever recorded in the Imperial Valley was 16 °F (−9 °C) on January 22, 1937. The highest maximum temperature ever recorded was 121 °F (49 °C) on July 28, 1995. The lowest maximum temperature was 42 °F (6 °C), recorded on January 24, 1949, and the highest minimum temperature was 92 °F (33 °C) on June 30, 1946. The highest monthly mean temperature was 95.9 °F (35.5 °C), recorded in August 1969 and the lowest mean temperature was 42.3 °F (5.7 °C) in February 1939.

The 85-year average annual rainfall is 2.93 inches (74 mm) with June being the driest month. The only recorded snowfall in the Valley occurred on December 12, 1932. Snow began falling at 8:45 p.m. and by 5 a.m. the next day 2.5 inches (6 cm) had been recorded. In the southwest portion of Imperial Valley, 4 inches (10 cm) of snow was reported that day. This was the only snowfall on record to cover the entire valley.

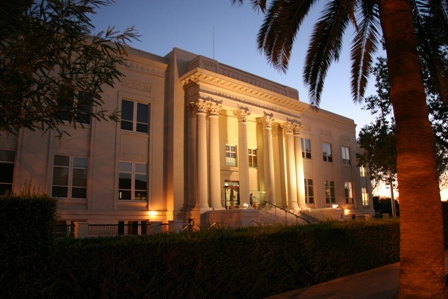
Imperial County Courthouse in El Centro

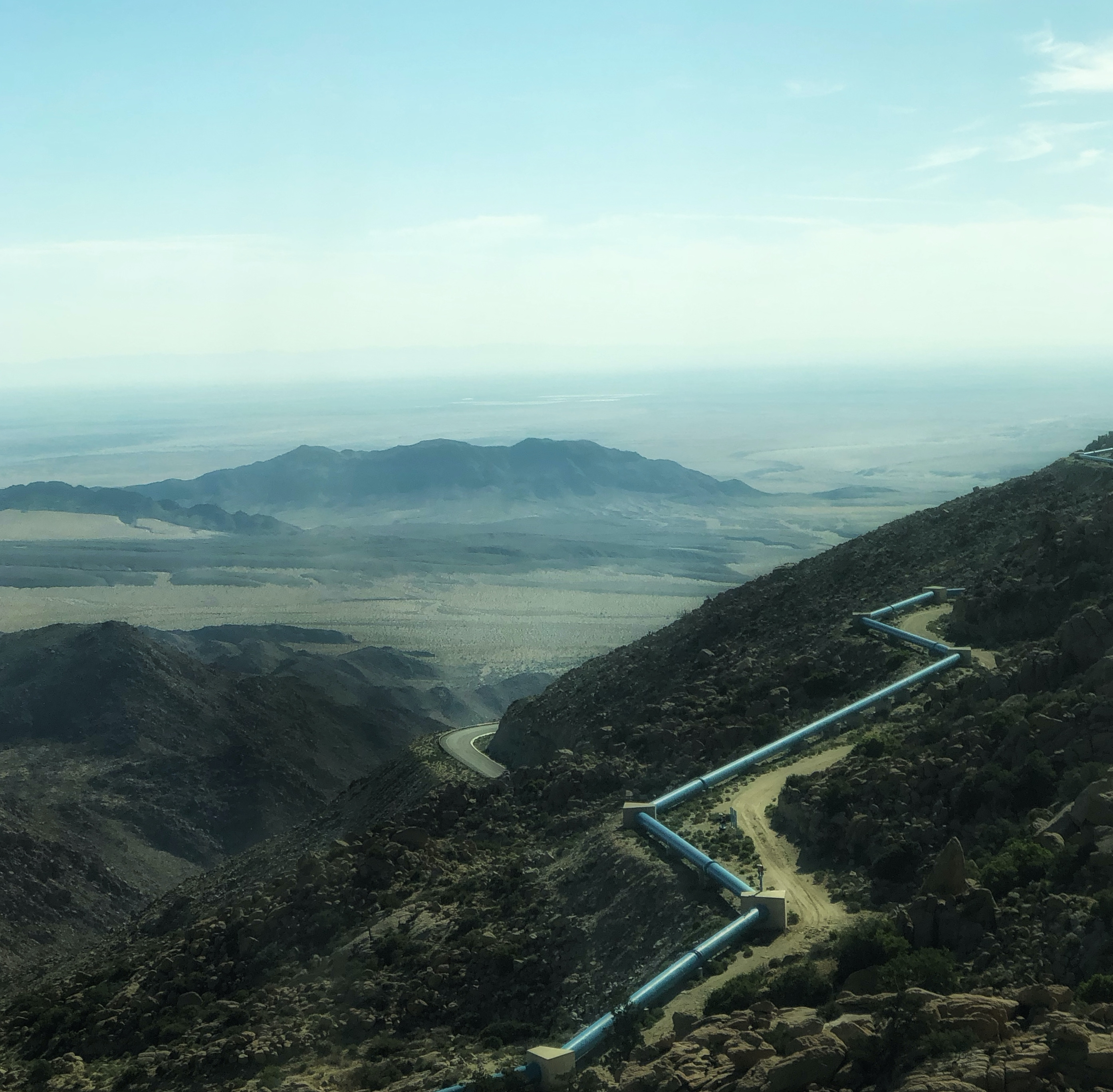
The Imperial Valley from the highway between Tijuana and Mexicali.

=== Regions ===
Imperial Valley can loosely categorize its cities and communities into three regions: the Salton Beach Towns, Desert Cities, and the El Centro area (urbanized Imperial). The Salton Sea Beach Towns have the smallest cities but were resorts in their heyday and have since shrunk in population and size due to the current state of the Salton Sea. The cities and communities of the desert region are outliers in that they are away from urbanized Imperial and tend to be smaller in population than the cities surrounding El Centro. Cities of the El Centro area tend to be larger than those of the desert and Salton regions. And the southeastern end of California is the state's poorest region, with lower-income residents making up over half of the year-round population.

=== Imperial Valley cities ===
==== Cities over 10,000 population ====
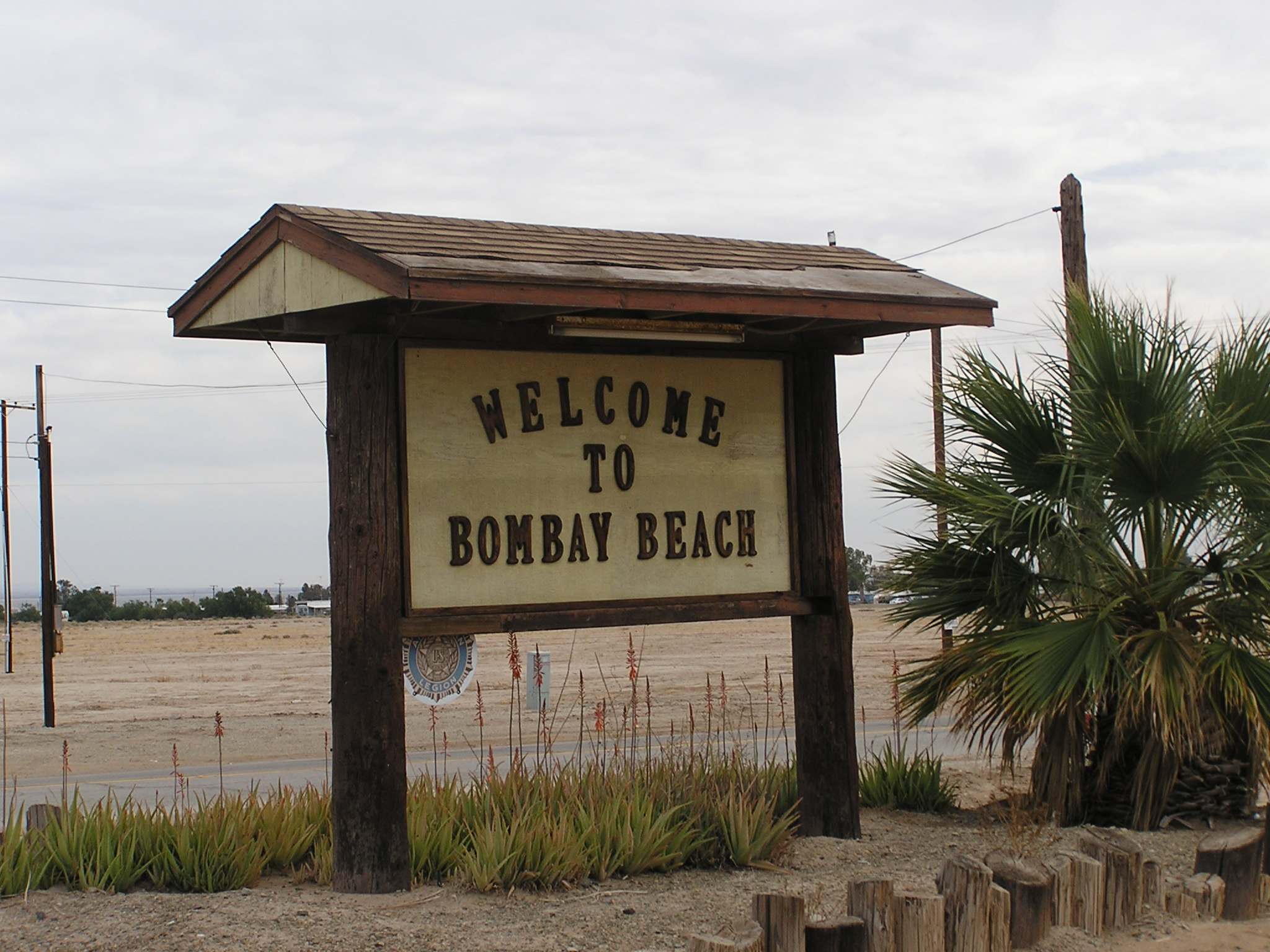
Bombay Beach sign along Highway 111

- Brawley
- Calexico
- El Centro (county seat)
- Imperial

==== Cities under 10,000 population ====
- Calipatria
- Holtville
- Westmorland
- Heber

==== Towns over 1,000 population ====
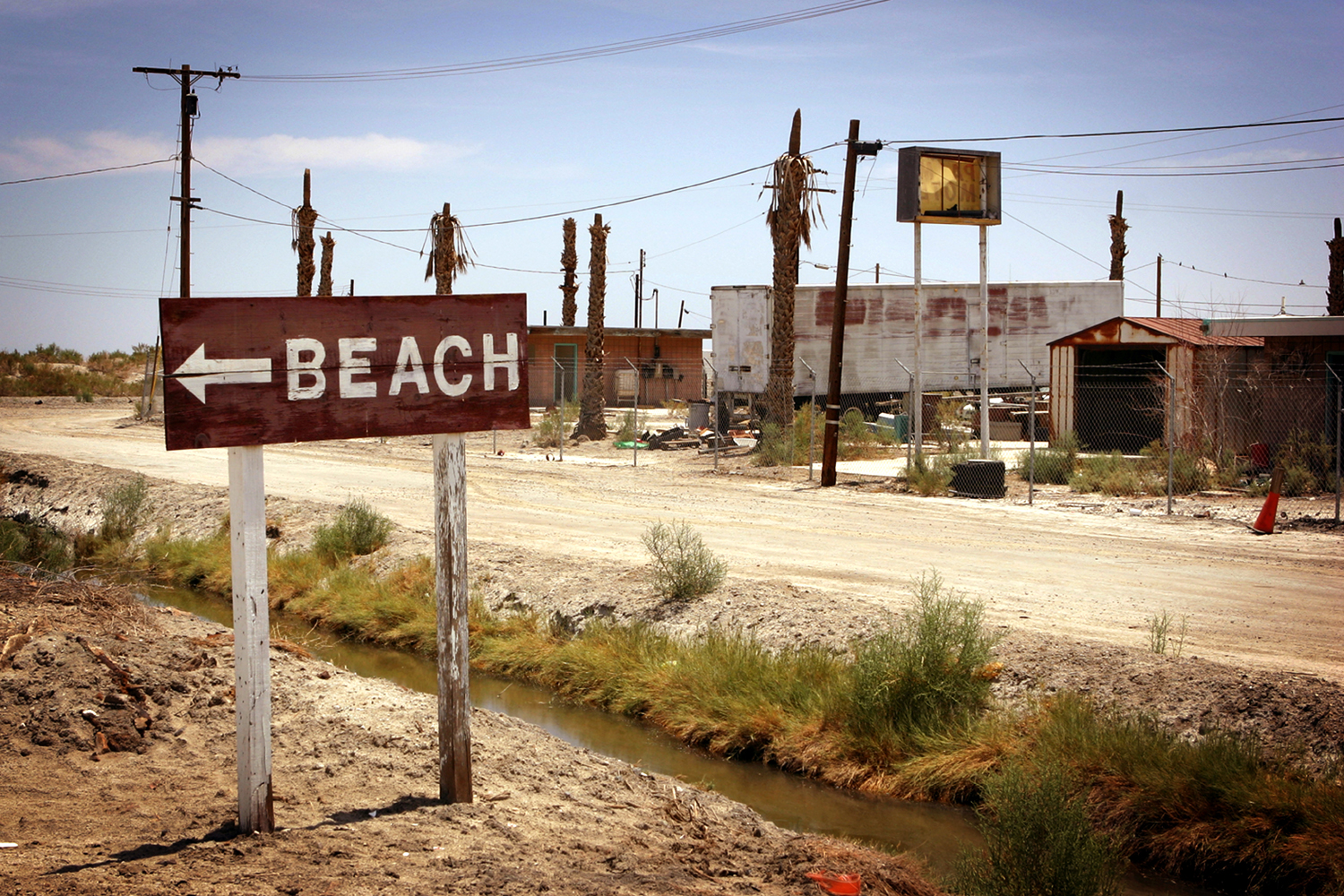
Salton Sea Beach

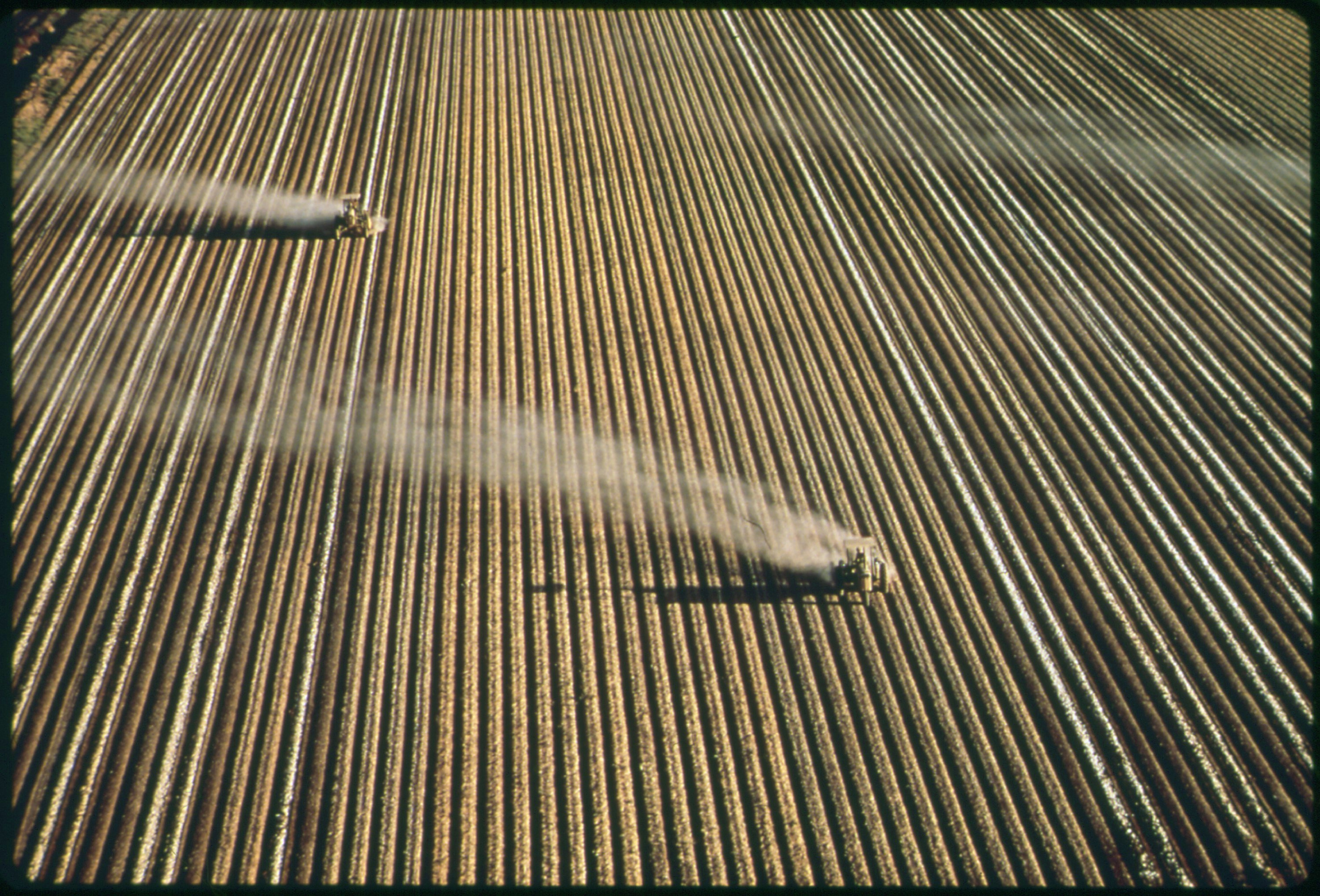
Fertilizing in the Imperial Valley, 1972. Photo by Charles O'Rear.

- Desert Shores
- Heber
- Niland
- Salton City
- Seeley

==== Towns under 1,000 population ====
- Bombay Beach
- Ocotillo
- Palo Verde
- Salton Sea Beach
- Winterhaven

=== Urban areas of the region ===
The El Centro, CA MSA is a multicore metropolitan region containing several urban areas.

Population rank	Name	State(s)	Type (UA/UC)	2020 population
1	El Centro	CA	UA	44,322
2	Calexico	CA	UC	38,633
3	Brawley	CA	UC	26,416
4	Imperial	CA	UC	18,631
5	Calipatria	CA	UC	6,515
6	Holtville	CA	UC	5,605
7	Salton City	CA	UC	5,155

== Economy ==
Imperial County's economy consists predominantly of government, agriculture, and retail trade that represents approximately 70% of total county employment. Government services account for over one-third of total employment. Agriculture accounts for one-fourth of jobs with major crops of alfalfa, lettuce, sugar beets and carrots. Retail growth has been experienced due to increased population in the Imperial and Mexicali Valleys. In 2005, the Imperial Valley Mall opened, attracting shoppers from the Valley area, including residents and tourists across the border from Mexicali.

=== Tourism ===
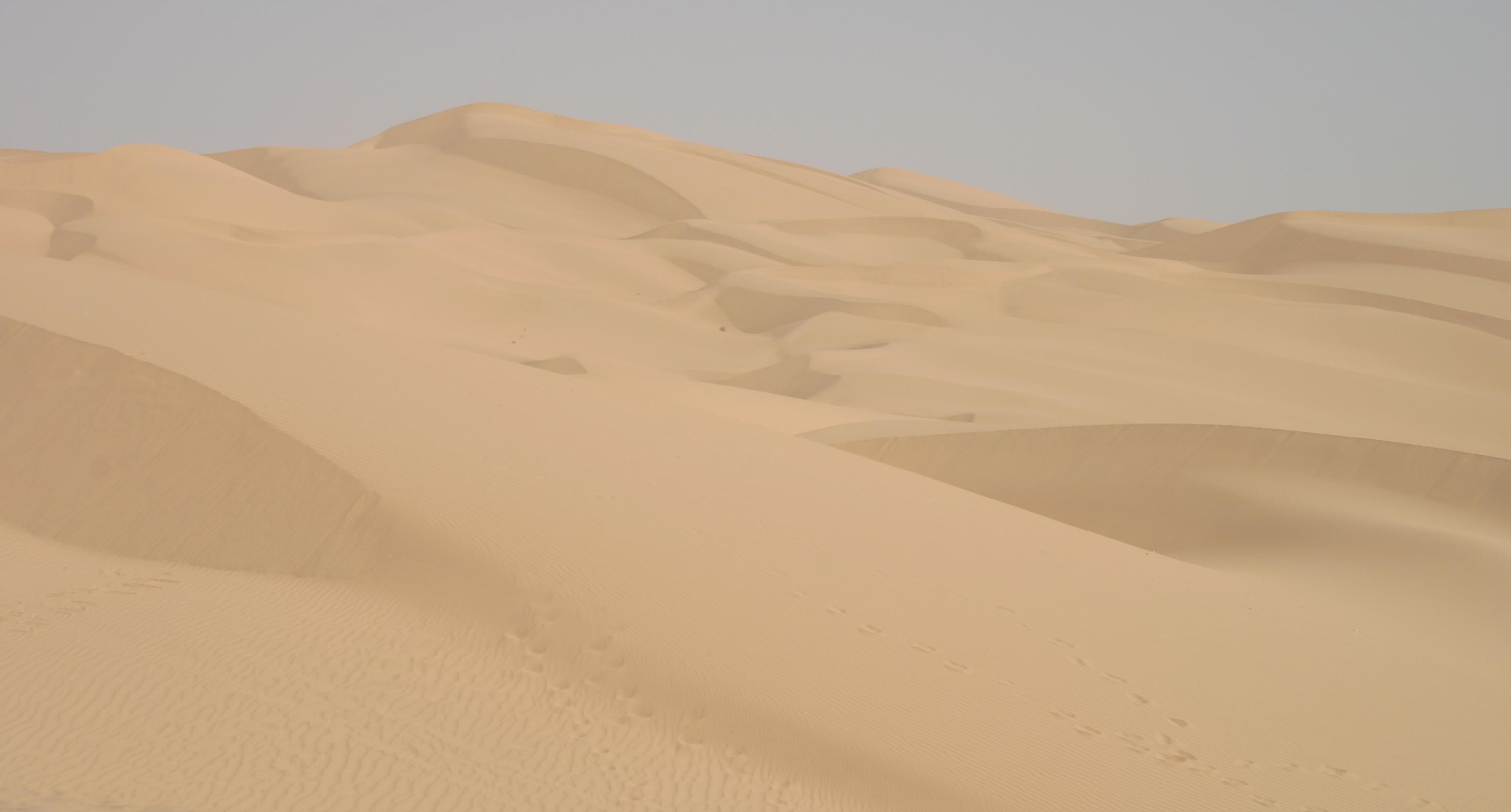
The Algodones Dunes

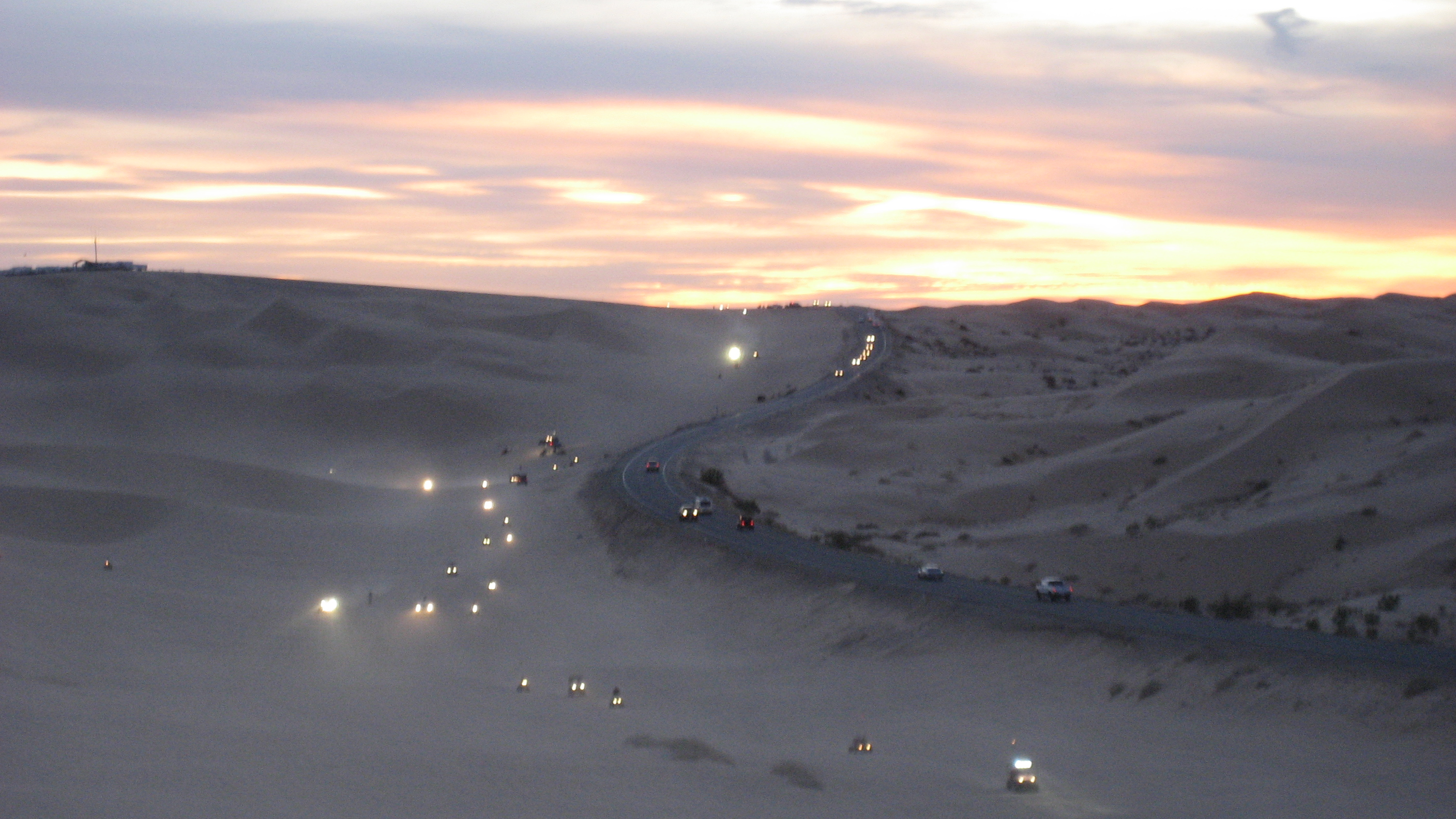
Off-road vehicle traffic on the dunes during the Presidents Day weekend, 2007

Tourism is considered the secondary industry of the Imperial Valley. Many visitors come to the area to visit the Salton Sea (California's largest inland lake, which serves as a dumpout point for the overflow and drainage from the IID canal system and ditch drainage) and the Algodones Dunes. The New River and the Alamo River flow from the border city of Mexicali northward to the Salton Sea.

Another popular destination is the Salton Sea mud pots and volcanoes. These mud pots and volcanoes are in an open field on the eastern side of the Salton Sea. The mud is just above ambient temperature and it is possible to walk right up to the vents. The location is host to a number of gray cones reaching heights of six feet (2 m) and depressions filled with bubbling mud. These features are the result of the geothermal activity in the area.

Off-roading on ATVs is another popular activity during the winter months. Heber Dunes State Vehicular Recreation Area is south of El Centro and is primarily an off-roading destination. The valley sand dune recreation area draws hundreds of thousands of off-road enthusiasts. Bird-watching is a popular activity, with abundant natural habitat and rare species. The Imperial Valley has an array of golf courses. Golf courses are in Holtville, Brawley and El Centro.

=== Sites of interest ===
==== Fort Yuma ====
Fort Yuma is on the banks of the Colorado River in Winterhaven, California. First established after the end of the Mexican–American War in 1848, it was originally in the bottoms near the Colorado River, less than 1-mile (1.6 km) below the mouth of the Gila River. It was to defend the newly settled community of Yuma, Arizona on the other side of the Colorado River and the nearby Mexican border. In March 1851 the post was moved to a small elevation on the Colorado's west bank, opposite the present city of Yuma, Arizona, on the site of the former Mission Puerto de Purísima Concepción. This site had been occupied by Camp Calhoun, named for John C. Calhoun, established in 1849. Fort Yuma was established to protect the southern emigrant travel route to California and to attempt control of the warlike Yuma Indians in the surrounding 100-mile (160 km) area.

==== Blue Angels ====
NAF El Centro is the winter home of the U.S. Navy Flight Demonstration Squadron, The Blue Angels. NAF El Centro historically starts the Blue Angels' season with their first air show, traditionally held in March.

==== Imperial Valley Expo & Fairgrounds ====
The Imperial Valley Expo & Fairgrounds is home to the California Mid-Winter Fair and Fiesta, which is the local county fair. It is also home to the Imperial Valley Speedway, a 3/8 mile (600 m) race track.

==== Algodones Sand Dunes ====
The name Algodones Dunes refers to the entire geographic feature, while the administrative designation for that portion managed by the Bureau of Land Management is the "Imperial Sand Dunes Recreation Area" (sometimes called the "Glamis Dunes"). The Algodones Sand Dunes are the largest mass of sand dunes in California. This dune system extends for more than 40 miles (60 km) along the eastern edge of the Imperial Valley agricultural region in a band averaging 5 miles (8 km) in width. A major east–west route of the Union Pacific railroad skirts the eastern edge. The dune system is divided into 3 areas. The northernmost area is known as Mammoth Wash. South of Mammoth Wash is the North Algodones Dunes Wilderness established by the 1994 California Desert Protection Act. This area is closed to motorized use and access is by hiking and horseback. The largest and most heavily used area begins at Highway 78 and continues south just past Interstate 8. The dune formations occurring in this area are popular in film-making and have been the site for movies such as Return of the Jedi.

==== Salton Buttes ====
The Salton Buttes are volcanoes on the southern shores of the Salton Sea.

==== Colorado River ====
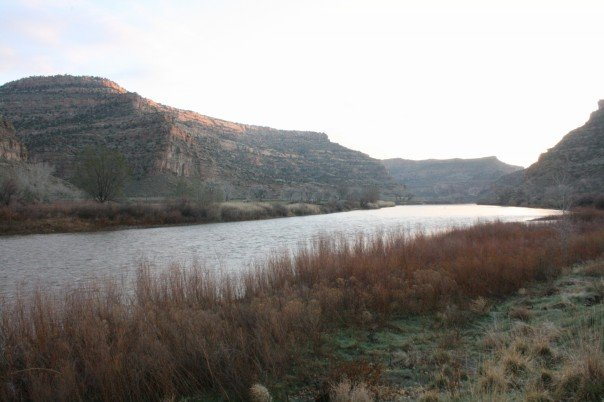
Colorado River

The Colorado River is a popular destination for water sports including fishing, boating, water-skiing, and jet-skiing. The Colorado River is a river in the southwestern United States and northwestern Mexico, approximately 1,450 miles (2,330 km) long, draining a part of the arid regions on the western slope of the Rocky Mountains. The natural course of the river flows from north of Grand Lake, Colorado into the Gulf of California. For many months out of the year, however, no water actually flows from the United States to the gulf, due to human consumption. Imperial Valley users use 3.8 km³ of the Colorado River annually

==== Salvation Mountain ====
Salvation Mountain (location 33°15′14.9″N 115°28′21.4″W) is a colorful artificial mountain north of Calipatria, California, near Slab City. It is made from adobe, straw, and thousands of gallons of paint. It was created by Leonard Knight to convey the message that "God Loves Everyone". Mr. Knight refused substantial donations of money and labor from supporters who wished to modify his message of universal love to favor or disfavor particular groups.

==== Anza-Borrego Desert State Park ====
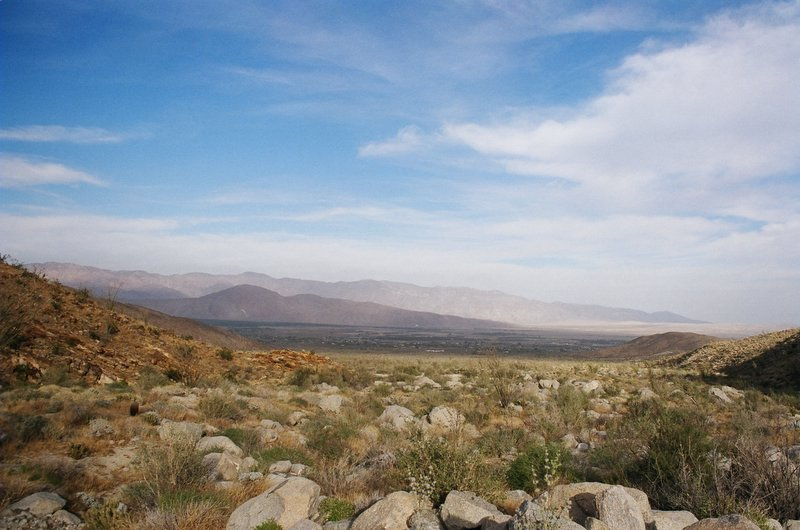
Vista of Anza Borrego

Anza-Borrego Desert State Park, portions of which are in Imperial County, is the largest state park in California. 500 miles (800 km) of dirt roads, 12 wilderness areas and miles of hiking trails provide visitors with an opportunity to see the Colorado Desert. The park is named after Spanish explorer Juan Bautista de Anza and the Spanish name borrego, or bighorn sheep. The park features washes, wildflowers, palm groves, cacti and sweeping vistas. Animals inhabiting the state park include greater roadrunners, golden eagles, kit foxes, southern mule deer and Peninsular bighorn sheep, as well as desert iguanas, chuckwallas, and sidewinders.

==== Fossil Canyon and Painted Gorge ====
Fossil Canyon and the surrounding area near Ocotillo in the Coyote Mountains are great places for rock hounding and fossil hunting. The fossils here are not dinosaurs, but ancient shells, coral, and oysters from the Miocene epoch when the area was underwater.

The Painted Gorge, on the eastern side of the Coyote Mountains, consists of sedimentary, metamorphic and igneous rocks.

==== Imperial NWR ====
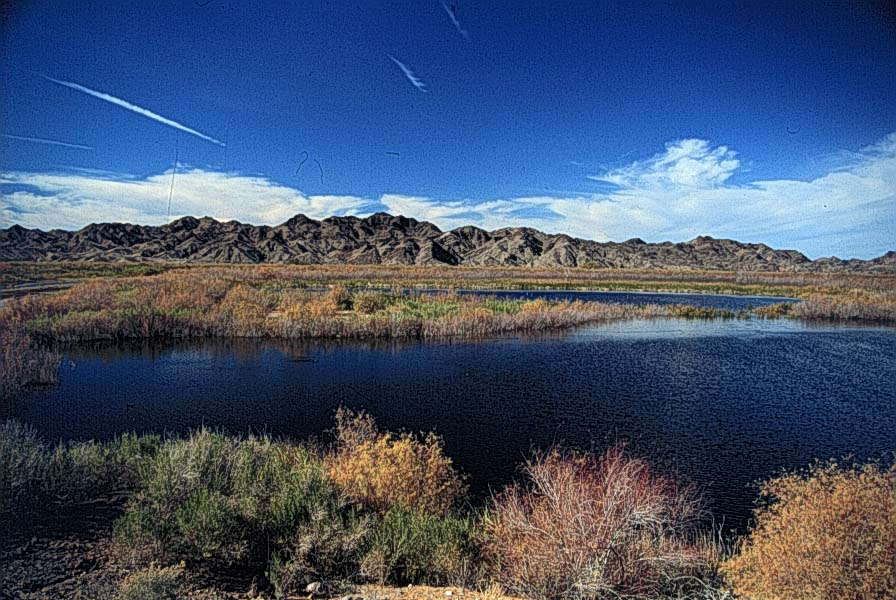
Mesquite point at Imperial NWR

The Imperial National Wildlife Refuge protects wildlife habitat along 30 miles (50 km) of the lower Colorado River in Arizona and California, including the last un-channeled section before the river enters Mexico. The river and its associated backwater lakes and wetlands are a green oasis, contrasting with the surrounding desert mountains. It is a refuge and breeding area for migratory birds and local desert wildlife.

==== Sonny Bono Salton Sea NWR ====
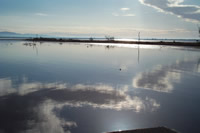
The Sonny Bono Salton Sea National Wildlife Refuge

The Sonny Bono Salton Sea National Wildlife Refuge, 40 miles (60 km) north of the Mexican border at the southern end of the Salton Sea and situated along the Pacific Flyway, is the only refuge of its kind, just 227 feet (69 m) below sea level. Because of its southern latitude, elevation and location in the Colorado Desert, the refuge experiences some of the highest temperatures in the nation. Daily temperatures from May to October generally exceed 100 °F (38 °C) with temperatures of 116–120 °F (47–49 °C) recorded yearly.

==== Mexicali ====
The border city of Mexicali, Baja California, Mexico, has museums, a zoo, a sports convention center, and an international airport. Visitors cross by foot or car from Calexico, California in the United States every day. Restaurants and taco stands, pharmacies, bars and dance clubs draw tourists. Many shops and stalls selling Mexican crafts and souvenirs within walking distance from the border. Also US residents get medical and dental services in Mexicali because they tend to be less expensive than those in the United States. Mexico's drinking age of 18 makes it a weekend destination for high school and college-aged Southern Californians.

=== Agriculture ===
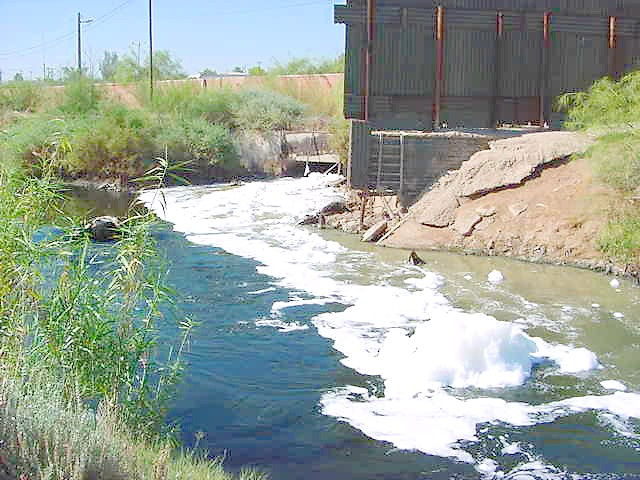
The New River

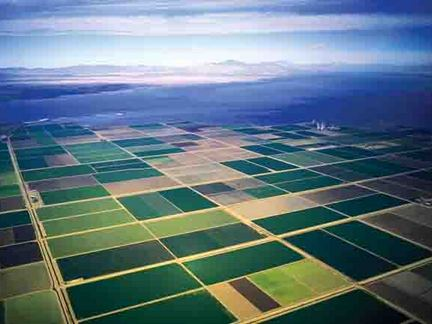
Fields of Imperial Valley, Salton Sea, (2008)

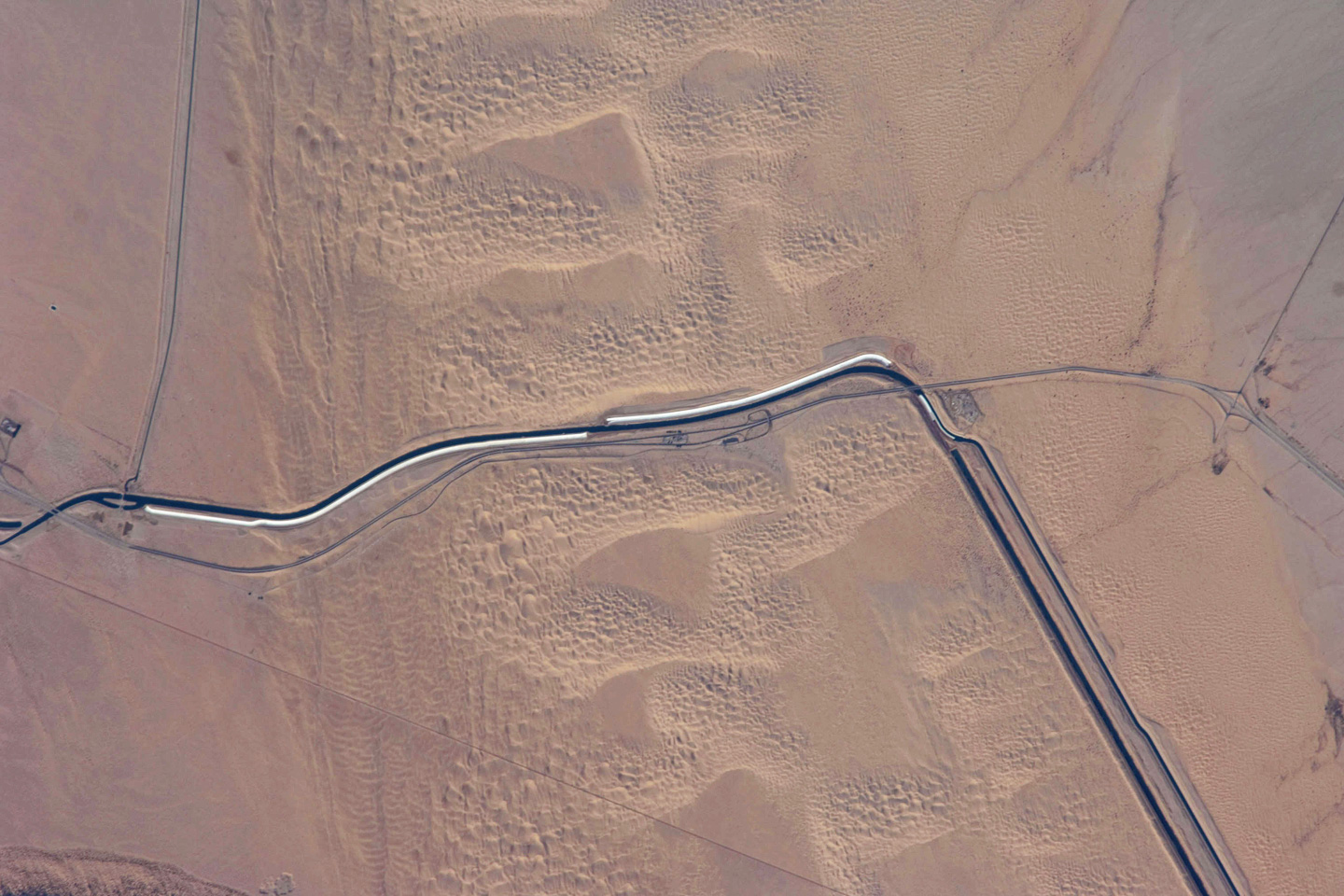
This image captures about 15 kilometers (9.3 mi) of the All-American Canal just west of Yuma, Arizona; photo is taken of the southern section of the Algodones Dunes

Although this region is in the Colorado Desert section of the Sonoran Desert, with high temperatures and low average rainfall of 3 inches (76 mm) per year, the economy is heavily based on agriculture due to irrigation, which is supplied wholly from the Colorado River via the All-American Canal. Farmers in Imperial Valley hold some of its oldest water rights and receive the largest share of water as of 2024, and their actions have been described as having a large effect on the Lake Mead reservoir.

Thousands of acres of prime farmland have transformed the desert into one of the most productive farming regions in California with an annual crop production of over $1 billion. Agriculture is the largest industry in the Imperial Valley and accounts for 48% of all employment. An environmental cost is that, south of the canal, the Colorado River no longer flows above ground at all for much of the year into Mexico.

A vast system of canals, check dams, and pipelines carry the water all over the valley, a system which forms the Imperial Irrigation District, or IID. The water distribution system includes over 1,400 miles (2,300 km) of canal and with 1,100 miles (1,800 km) of pipeline. The number of canal and pipeline branches number roughly over a hundred. Imported water and a long growing season allow two crop cycles each year, and the Imperial Valley is a major source of winter fruits and vegetables, cotton, and grain for U.S. and international markets. Alfalfa is another major crop produced in the Imperial Valley. The agricultural lands are served by a constructed agricultural drain system, which conveys surface runoff and subsurface drainage from fields to the Salton Sea, which is a designated repository for agricultural runoff, with environmental considerations not yet solved.

- All-American Canal
- All-American Canal Bridge
- Alamo Canal
- California Development Company
- Coachella Canal
- Imperial Irrigation District
- Imperial Land Company

=== Renewable energy ===
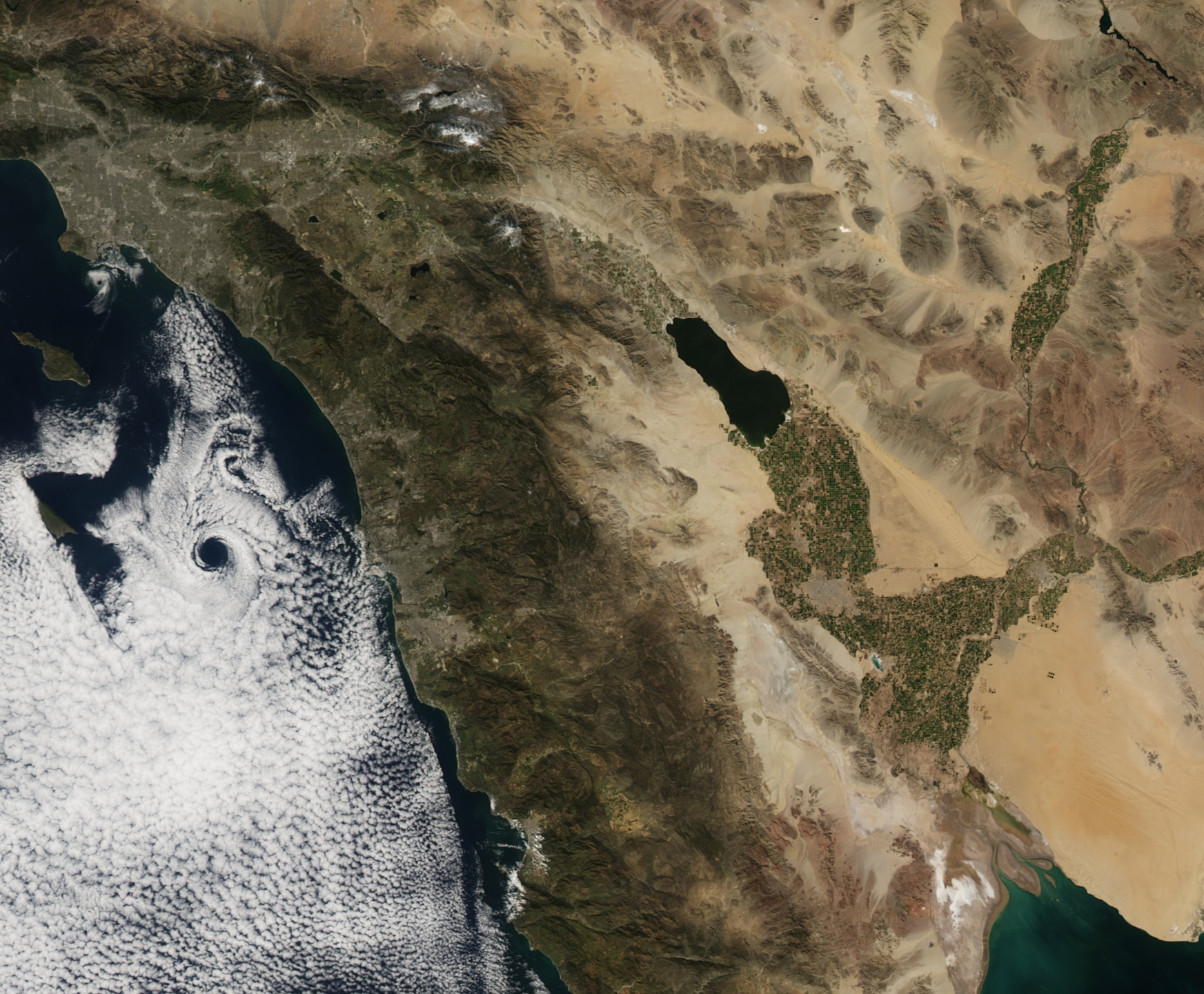
Salton Trough area. The red lines are simplified faults. Right-lateral direction of motion of the transform fault is shown (pink arrows). The red rhombs are pull-apart basins; the northern one is the site of the Niland (Salton Sea) geothermal field, the southern the Cerro Prieto geothermal field.

Imperial Valley has become a "hot-bed" of renewable energy projects, both solar and geothermal. This is driven in part by California's mandate to generate 33% of its electricity from renewable sources by 2020, the valley's excellent sun resources, the high unemployment, its proximity to large population centers on the coast, and large tracts of undeveloped desert land.

Much of the land suitable for green energy is owned by the federal government (Bureau of Land Management). As of April 2008, the BLM has received 163 applications to build renewable energy projects on 1,600,000 acres (6,500 km^{2}) in California, "almost all of them are planned for the Imperial Valley and the desert region north of the valley."

In addition, in 2012 Synthetic Genomics bought an 81-acre (33-hectare) site in the Imperial Valley to produce algae fuel with their engineered algae strains, as well as other algae products such as food.

== Demographics ==
The Imperial and Mexicali Valleys share a common international bond of both American and Hispanic cultures. On the U.S. side, the majority of residents are of Mexican-American or Latino heritage, while the Mexican side has been greatly influenced by American culture by the U.S. for many decades. The entire valley has multi-racial representation of Africans, Europeans, east and south Asians, and Native Americans.

The El Centro Metropolitan Area is home to 182,972 residents, according to a 2017 US Census estimate, and encompasses the whole Imperial County. The area is in the far southeast region of the State of California. Major population centers are Brawley, Calexico, and El Centro, which is the county seat.

As per the 2020 Census, Imperial County population was 179,702, an increase of 2.96% compared to 2010 population of 174,528. The population density was 41.8 people per square mile (16.1 people per square kilometer). The racial makeup of the county was 85% Hispanic or Latino, 3.3% black or African American, 2.5% Native American, 2.1% Asian, 0.2% Native Hawaiian or Pacific Islander, and 1.7% from two or more races. 65.7% spoke Spanish and 32.3% English as their first language.

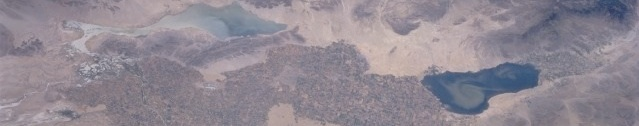
Laguna Salada, Mexicali Valley, Imperial Valley, Salton Sea and Coachella Valley (left–right)

There were 39,384 households, out of which 46.7% had children under the age of 18 living with them, 57.7% were married couples living together, 17.1% had a female householder with no husband present, and 20.1% were non-families. 17.1% of all households were made up of individuals, and 8.1% had someone living alone who was 65 years of age or older. The average household size was 3.33 and the average family size was 3.77. In the county the population was spread out, with 31.4% under the age of 18, 9.9% from 18 to 24, 30.4% from 25 to 44, 18.2% from 45 to 64, and 10.0% who were 65 years of age or older. The median age was 31 years. For every 100 females, there were 109.3 males. For every 100 females age 18 and over, there were 111.4 males.

United States presidential election results for Imperial County, California
Year	Republican		Democratic		Third party(ies)	
Year	No.	%	No.	%	No.	%
1908	909	47.64%	675	35.38%	324	16.98%
1912	13	0.39%	1,295	38.46%	2,059	61.15%
1916	2,694	40.46%	3,273	49.15%	692	10.39%
1920	4,699	64.51%	2,022	27.76%	563	7.73%
1924	3,455	50.28%	759	11.04%	2,658	38.68%
1928	5,417	67.61%	2,486	31.03%	109	1.36%
1932	3,783	29.01%	8,772	67.28%	484	3.71%
1936	4,771	38.34%	7,560	60.75%	113	0.91%
1940	6,854	46.59%	7,728	52.53%	130	0.88%
1944	5,979	53.81%	5,085	45.76%	48	0.43%
1948	6,217	52.64%	5,301	44.89%	292	2.47%
1952	11,044	62.13%	6,619	37.24%	112	0.63%
1956	10,526	56.05%	8,197	43.65%	58	0.31%
1960	10,606	53.55%	9,119	46.04%	81	0.41%
1964	10,330	48.06%	11,143	51.85%	19	0.09%
1968	10,818	52.91%	7,481	36.59%	2,147	10.50%
1972	14,178	62.05%	7,982	34.93%	689	3.02%
1976	10,618	49.94%	10,244	48.18%	400	1.88%
1980	12,068	55.92%	7,961	36.89%	1,550	7.18%
1984	13,829	62.01%	8,237	36.94%	235	1.05%
1988	12,889	55.16%	10,243	43.84%	233	1.00%
1992	9,759	38.55%	11,109	43.88%	4,450	17.58%
1996	9,705	36.76%	14,591	55.27%	2,104	7.97%
2000	12,524	43.28%	15,489	53.53%	924	3.19%
2004	15,890	46.36%	17,964	52.41%	420	1.23%
2008	14,008	36.08%	24,162	62.24%	650	1.67%
2012	12,777	33.13%	25,136	65.18%	652	1.69%
2016	12,704	26.42%	32,667	67.93%	2,720	5.66%
2020	20,847	36.74%	34,678	61.11%	1,218	2.15%
2024	26,546	49.12%	26,083	48.27%	1,409	2.61%

== Politics ==
Imperial County was initially a Republican-leaning county in presidential elections: Barry Goldwater lost the county by less than four points in 1964 when he lost the national popular vote by 24 points. The county shifted towards the Democratic Party in the 1990s, and until 2024 the last Republican to have won a majority in a Presidential election in Imperial County was George H. W. Bush in the 1988 United States presidential election. Between 1996 and 2020 every Democratic nominee won at least 52 percent of the county's vote, and Hillary Clinton reached almost 68 percent — the best performance by any candidate in the county's history — in 2016. However, a rapid rightward swing, common to most counties on the Mexican border, saw Donald Trump narrowly win the county with a 26-point swing in 2024.

On November 4, 2008, Imperial County voted 69.7% for Proposition 8, which amended the California Constitution to ban same-sex marriages, showing more support for the proposition than any other strongly Democratic county.

Imperial County is in California's 25th congressional district, represented by Democrat Raul Ruiz. In the state legislature, the county is in the 36th Assembly district, represented by Republican Jeff Gonzalez, and the 18th senatorial district, represented by Democrat Steve Padilla.

The median income for a household in the county was $31,870, and the median income for a family was $35,226. Males had a median income of $32,775 versus $23,974 for females. The per capita income for the county was $13,239. About 19.4% of families and 22.6% of the population were below the poverty line, including 28.7% of those under age 18 and 13.6% of those age 65 or over.

== Education ==
=== Schools in the Imperial Valley ===
The Imperial Valley has a range of schools including high schools, middle/junior high schools, elementary schools, and colleges. These include Central Union High School, Southwest High School, Calexico High School, Holtville High School, Imperial High School, Calipatria High School, and Brawley Union High School. Imperial Valley College, in Imperial, and SDSU Imperial Valley Extension, in Calexico, are local. The valley also offers a partnership between the local community college, Imperial Valley College, and SDSU's extension which offers a four-year bachelor's degree for students in the area. The program was formally named imperial Valley Partnership University.

== Transportation ==
=== Major highways ===
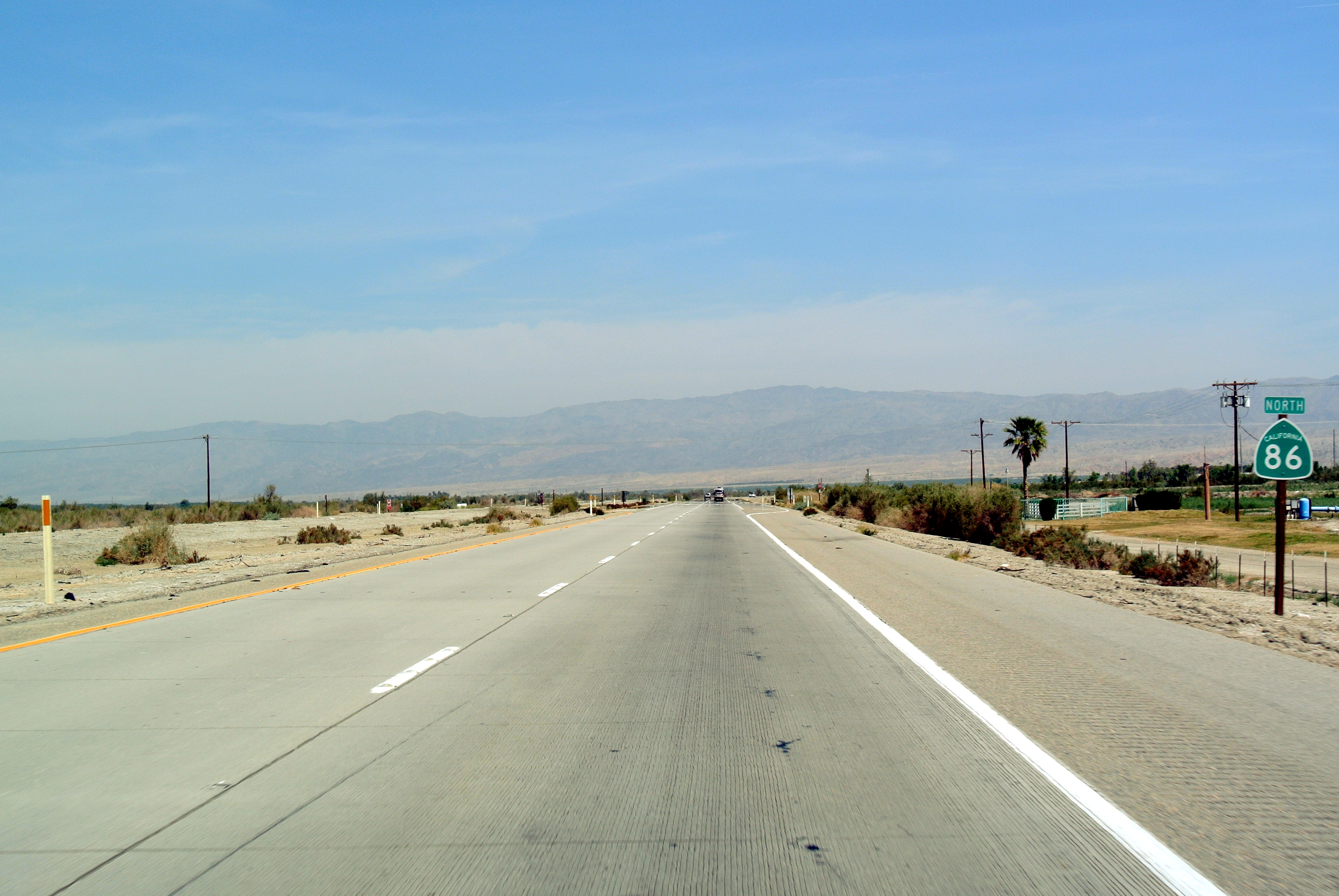
State Route 86 north of Salton City

- Interstate 8
- State Route 7
- State Route 78
- State Route 86
- State Route 98
- State Route 111
- State Route 115

=== Public transportation ===
- Greyhound Lines
- Imperial Valley Transit
- Yuma County Area Transit
- Amtrak

=== Airports ===
Imperial County Airport is the main airport in the county. It is primarily a general aviation airport with limited commercial flight service. Major regional airports near the county include San Diego International Airport, Palm Springs International Airport, Yuma International Airport, and Mexicali International Airport.

Airport	IATA code	ICAO code	City
Calexico International Airport	CXL	KCXL	Calexico
Holtville Airport	L04	none	Holtville
Imperial County Airport	IPL	KIPL	Imperial

== In popular culture ==
Robert A. Heinlein's science fiction short story "Water Is for Washing" (Argosy, November 1947) was based on the premise that an earthquake had catastrophically shattered the range of deposits separating the Imperial Valley from the Gulf of California, precipitating a tidal wave moving north to transiently drown these lowlands. At the beginning of the story, Heinlein uses the character of a bartender in El Centro to establish the danger of the quake and inundation:

You've heard about the 1905 flood, when the Colorado River spilled over and formed the Salton Sea? But don't be too sure about quakes; valleys below sea level don't just grow—something has to cause them. The San Andreas Fault curls around this valley like a question mark. Just imagine the shake-up it must have taken to drop thousands of square miles below the level of the Pacific.

Due to its desert environment and proximity to Los Angeles, California, movies are sometimes filmed in the sand dunes outside the agricultural portions of the Imperial Valley. These have included:

- American Sniper
- Return of the Jedi
- Independence Day
- Stargate
- The Scorpion King
- Patriot Games
- Into the Wild
- The Men who Stare at Goats
- La Bamba
- The original Flight of the Phoenix (1965) was filmed outside of Holtville.
- The Tom Cruise movie Losin' It (1983) was filmed in Calexico.
- Wake Island (1942). Most of the movie's outside scenes were filmed at Salton Sea Lake in the Imperial Valley of California.

Additionally, portions of the 2005 film Jarhead were filmed here because of its similarity to the desert terrain of Iraq.

== Notable people ==
- Cher, entertainer
- Dalip Saund, first Asian American or Sikh American Congressman, helped secure citizenship and immigration rights for Indian and Chinese Americans
- Uttam Dhillon, former acting Administrator of the DEA
- Royce Freeman, NFL running back
- Edith Summers Kelley, author
- Mike Mohamed, NFL linebacker
- Sergio Romo, MLB pitcher
- Rudy Seánez, former MLB pitcher
- Robert Thomas, NFL linebacker
- Andy Ruiz Jr., boxing, heavyweight champion
- George Brown Jr., progressive organizer and United States Congressman
- Margarita Cota-Cárdenas, Chicana poet and author

== See also ==
- 1940 El Centro earthquake
- 1979 Imperial Valley earthquake
- Imperial Valley Press
- Niland Geyser
- O. M. Wozencraft – "Father of the Imperial Valley"
