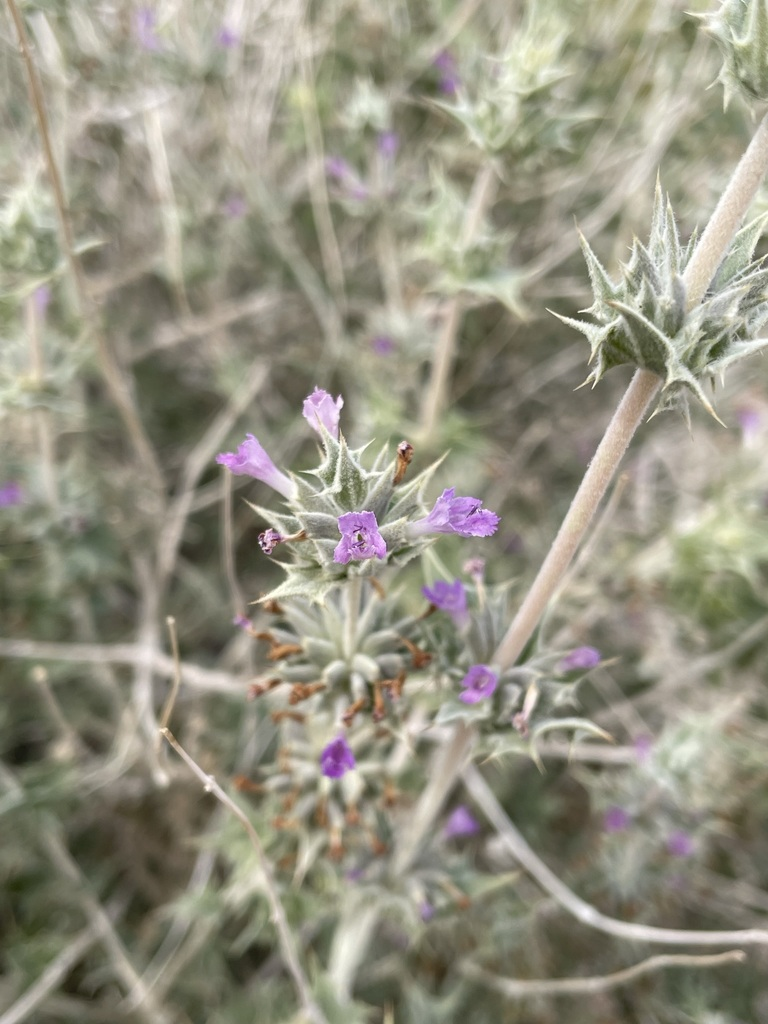

Conservation status
- Imperiled (NatureServe)

Scientific classification
- Kingdom: Plantae
- Clade: Tracheophytes
- Clade: Angiosperms
- Clade: Eudicots
- Clade: Asterids
- Order: Lamiales
- Family: Lamiaceae
- Genus: Salvia
- Species: S. greatae

Binomial name
- Salvia greatae Brandegee

= Salvia greatae =

Species of flowering plant

Salvia greatae is a species of flowering plant in the mint family, Lamiaceae. Its common names include Orocopia sage and lavender sage.

== Distribution ==
The plant is endemic to California, where it is found in the mountainous Colorado Desert of southern Riverside and northern Imperial Counties, mainly in the Orocopia and Chocolate Mountains.

This plant grows in Sonoran Desert ecoregion habitats, on floodplains and along the edges of washes. It is scattered in distribution but it can be a dominant species in patches of appropriate habitat.

== Description ==
Salvia greatae forms a low, rounded shrub under 1 metre (3.3 ft) tall, its many branches coated in tangled, glandular hairs. The non-deciduous, hairy leaves are up to 2 centimeters long, the edges lined with several long, sharp-pointed teeth tipped with spines.

Flowers are borne in interrupted clusters along the stem branches. Each flower has a double-lipped tubular corolla about a centimeter long in a shade of pinkish purple. The corolla is surrounded by spiny sepals. It is aromatic.
