= Margarita Cota-Cárdenas =

American poet

- Born: November 10, 1941 (age 84); Heber, California, U.S.
- Occupations: Poet, novelist
- Notable work: Noches despertando in conciencias (1976), Puppet: A Chicano Novella (1985, 2000)

Margarita Cota-Cárdenas (born November 10, 1941) is an American poet and author. A voice for Chicano literature, Cota-Cárdenas is known for her 1985 novella Puppet: A Chicano Novella and her works of poetry. She is a professor emerita of Spanish at Arizona State University.

== Biography ==
=== Early life ===
Cota-Cárdenas was born in Heber, California, to two migrant workers, her father Jesús Cota from Mexico and her mother Margarita Cárdenas de Cota from New Mexico. Her parents established permanent residence in California and worked as contractors. Along with her seven younger siblings, she was raised in the Imperial Valley of California, an area in Southern California that blends Mexican and American cultures due to its geographical proximity to the nations' border and its regional history.

Her interest in writing began at a young age, though she had other aspirations throughout her childhood as well. She first intended to become a nun, but promptly changed her mind. From 1955 to 1959, she attended Orestimba High School, where she wrote for the school newspaper and succeeded in several writing competitions. She was a top student and received many honors in high school. During these years, Cota-Cárdenas transitioned from pursuing medical school to pursuing acting. She eventually received a scholarship from the Department of Theatre Arts at the University of California, Los Angeles, which she turned down.

=== Education ===
Cota-Cárdenas attended Modesto Junior College and California State University, Stanislaus, where she received her Bachelor of Arts degree in 1966. She earned a master's degree from the University of California, Davis in 1968. The next year, she began writing poetry seriously. After teaching at her alma mater for two years, she earned her doctoral degree from the University of Arizona in 1980. During her time of education, Cota-Cárdenas was a divorced mother of three children and had little time to devote to the Chicano movement. Beginning in 1981, she taught courses in bilingual Spanish, Chicano and Chicana literature, and Mexican literature at Arizona State University.

=== Career ===
Cota-Cárdenas and Eliana Suárez Rivero founded the publishing company Scorpion Press, which was funded by the National Endowment for the Arts and designed to publish works by bilingual, bicultural women. In 1976, her collection of poems Noches despertando in conciencias was published by Scorpion Press in Spanish and was well-received. "Nostalgia," published in Siete Poetas in 1978 under Scorpion Press, is one of her more popular poems, inspired by her childhood experience of viewing a drive-in movie starring María Félix as a heroic nun. As a girl, Cota-Cárdenas then enrolled in the Convent of Good Shepherd in New Mexico to become a nun and changed her mind shortly after, unsatisfied by the strict lifestyle and homesickness she experienced.

I thought then
that I would like to be a nun with
long white veil floating in the wind
mounting on horseback like the actress María Félix
riding riding off into
a lovely cinema type sunset
in the Convent of the Good Shepherd
we ate dark cornflakes
wheaties with coffee and not milk and thus
poor but pure we would get to be
instant nuns
the way I thought one could do everything
like in the movies of the 1940s
at the Motor-Vu.

— Margarita Cota-Cárdenas, "Nostalgia" (1978), translated from Spanish

In 1985, Cota-Cárdenas published Puppet, her first extended fiction piece. The novella is based on some real-life events and is somewhat autobiographical in nature. In 2000, a bilingual translation of Puppet was published. She has published other poems, collections, and fictional works, and has been included in several anthologies such as Infinite Divisions: An Anthology of Chicana Literature (1993) edited by Tey Diana Rebolledo and Eliana Suárez Rivero. In 2003, Cota-Cárdenas retired from her teaching position at Arizona State University, but continues to write and publish more pieces.

== Analysis of literature ==
Cota-Cárdenas' writing has focused on women's issues and feminism, just as it has been centered on the Mexican American experience in the U.S. Unlike many other writers of bilingual literature, and unlike most Chicana writers, she relies more on Spanish and code-switching between Spanish and English in many of her works. In the past, Cota-Cárdenas has expressed a deeper connection to her literature through the use of the Spanish language. Cota-Cárdenas' interest in developing Chicana representation in male- and Anglo-dominated societies is evident, since her works confront language barriers, the Chicanx identity and its representation, and feminism, especially as these pertain to bilingual literature.

=== Puppet: A Chicano Novella ===
Her first work of fiction and her most famous work, Puppet was published in Spanish in 1985, then reissued in a bilingual edition in 2000. The novella fuses fiction and reality, as Cota-Cárdenas explores ideas about social issues, activism, and race, gender, and ethnicity during the Chicano movement. Based on real-life events, the story follows a nineteen-year-old Chicano named Puppet, who is shot to death by the police. Puppet is silenced not only by linguistic barriers and by his speech impediment, but also by authority figures. In the story, Petra Levya, a Spanish professor, writes a novel in response to the death of Puppet, all while exploring her own values and identities through social and political lenses.

The narrative style in Puppet is disjointed, while the form is nonlinear, making the work experimental and postmodern. Information is given in complex ways that often disregard time order and the completion of thoughts. While capturing Petra's emotions, the novella's chaotic narration also connects with the actions of the police and of the community. Cota-Cárdenas plays with language through her irregular grammatical choices, which reflect the narrator's internal conflicts and confusion, as well as her usage of humor and irony. Simultaneously, her emphasis on understanding cultural reality necessitate the novella's inclusion of the Spanish language, even in translation.

Puppet is often studied in Spanish in university Chicanx courses and has become an underground classic. In Cota-Cárdenas' second novel, Sanctuaries of the Heart/Santuarios del corazón (2005), Petra Levya returns once more in a work that addresses social justice, the impact of culture on literature, and the complexities of Chicana consciousness.

=== Poetry ===
Many of Cota-Cárdenas' poems share a similar social awareness, though some reflect her childhood and familial experiences, as well as her pathway to adulthood. "Nostalgia," for example, reflects on her uninhibited capacity to dream and her perceived freedom as a child, which is then contrasted by her realization of the restrictions on these dreams as an adult. "Chicano Nocture" includes the intersection between her Chicana identity and her innocence as a child, discussing her fear of "THE IMMIGRATION PATROL," as she writes, and its ability to suddenly cut family connections. Other poems she has written focus on her motherhood, and how her identities and her children's identities are impacted by time and perspective.

== Publications ==
=== Books ===
- Noches despertando in conciencias (1976)
- Puppet: A Chicano Novella (1985)
- Marchitas de mayo (1989)
- Sanctuaries of the Heart/Santuarios del corazón (2005)

=== Others ===
- Siete poetas (1978), edited by Cota-Cárdenas and Eliana Suárez Rivero and includes poems by Cota-Cárdenas
- "El velorio del Wimpy" in Avanzando: gramática española y lectura, Cuaderno B (1978), edited by Sara Lequerica de la Vega and Carmen Salazar Parr
- The Third Woman: Minority Women Writers of the United States (1980), edited by Dexter Fisher and includes poems by Cota-Cárdenas
- Chicanos: Antología histórica y literaria (1980), edited by Tino Villanueva and includes poems by Cota-Cárdenas
- Flor y Canto IV and V: An Anthology of Chicano Literature (1980), includes poems by Cota-Cárdenas
- "Malinche's Discourse" from Puppet (1985, 2000) in Infinite Divisions: An Anthology of Chicana Literature (1993), edited by Tey Diana Rebolledo and Eliana Suárez Rivero
