= Sonny Bono Salton Sea National Wildlife Refuge =

Protected area in Imperial Valley, California

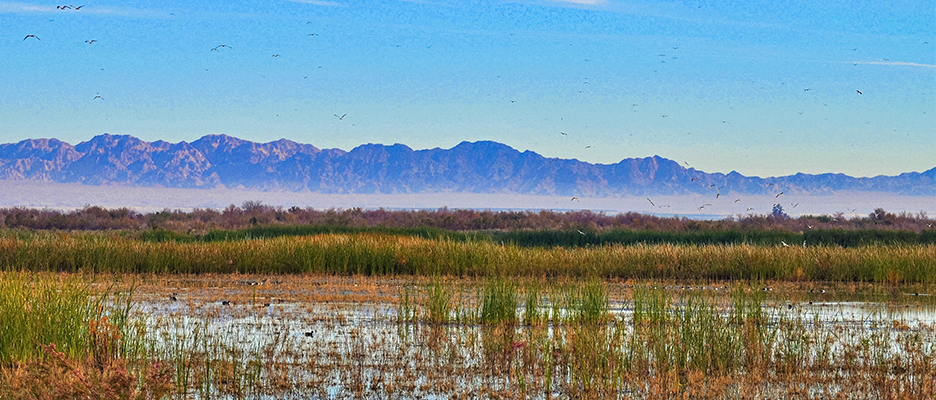

- Location within California Location within the United States
- Location: Imperial County, California, United States
- Nearest city: Brawley, California
- Coordinates: 33°9′N 115°44′W
- Area: 2,200 acres (9 km^{2})
- Established: 1930
- Governing body: U.S. Fish and Wildlife Service
- Website: Sonny Bono Salton Sea National Wildlife Refuge

The Sonny Bono Salton Sea National Wildlife Refuge is located in the Imperial Valley of California, 40 miles (64 km) north of the Mexican border. Situated at the southern end of the Salton Sea, the refuge protects one of the most important nesting sites and stopovers along the Pacific Flyway. Despite its location in the Colorado Desert, a subdivision of the larger Sonoran Desert, the refuge contains marine, freshwater, wetland, and agricultural habitats which provide sanctuary for hundreds of birds and wetland species, including several that have been listed as endangered or sensitive by the U.S. Fish and Wildlife Service.

== History ==
The Salton Sea is the most recent form of Lake Cahuilla, an ancient lake which has cyclically formed and dried over the centuries due to natural flooding from the Colorado River. The current Salton Sea was formed when Colorado River floodwater breached an irrigation canal being constructed in the Imperial Valley in 1905 and flowed into the Salton Sink. For decades, the Sea continued to receive sufficient quantities of water from irrigation runoff and the New and Alamo rivers, providing fresher water to the Salton Sea. This lake in the desert became a favorite getaway for Hollywood stars, and the Sea was stocked with sport fish to entice anglers. In 1930, 32,766 acres were set aside to establish the Salton Sea Refuge. The refuge in its modern form has expanded to 37,900 acres today.

But over time, the evaporation of water in the hot desert, combined with fallowing of farm fields to supply additional water to San Diego County and lack of outflow, has continued to decrease the size of the sea. This results in a highly saline body of water that is losing its ability to sustain fish and organisms essential for migrating birds that depend on it. In a different time, other water bodies would have provided alternate spots for migrating birds, but loss and degradation of suitable habitat in this part of the Pacific Flyway necessitates the Salton Sea remain a staple of the flyway.

In 1998, the refuge was renamed after Congressman Sonny Bono to Sonny Bono Salton Sea National Wildlife Refuge, who helped inform the U.S. Congress of the environmental issues facing the Salton Sea as well as acquiring funding for this refuge to help it respond to avian disease outbreaks and other habitat challenges at the Salton Sea. Efforts to address the restoration of the Salton Sea have been in process for many years and will continue for many more.

== Geography & Climate ==
The Salton Sea Refuge is located at the southern end of the Salton Sea. The land of the refuge is flat, except for Rock Hill, a small, inactive volcano, and is bordered by the Salton Sea on the north and farmlands on the east, south, and west. The refuge is composed of two disjunctive units, separated by 18 miles (29 km) of private lands. Each unit contains managed wetland habitat, agricultural fields, and tree rows. The courses of the New and Alamo rivers run through the refuge, providing fresher water inflow to the Salton Sea. Despite these freshwater inflows, the Salton Sea retains a high level of salinity. The Salton Sea Authority has measured the current salinity of the sea to be 60 PPT. By comparison, the ocean water is approximately 35 PPT.

Because of its southern latitude, elevation of 227 feet (69 m) feet below sea level, and location in the Colorado and Sonoran Deserts, the refuge sees some of the hottest temperatures in the nation. Daily temperatures from May to October generally exceed 100 °F with temperatures of 116°–120 °F recorded yearly.

== Ecology and Wildlife ==
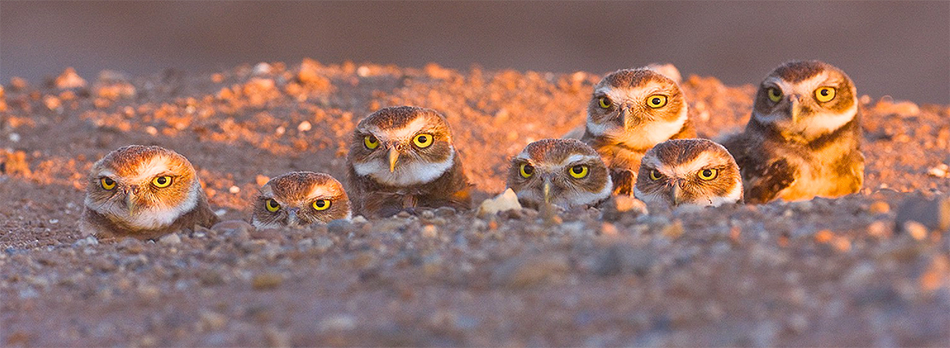
Burrowing Owls at the Sonny Bono Salton Sea National Wildlife Refuge

The Sonny Bono Salton Sea National Wildlife Refuge encompasses many varied habitats despite its desert location. Besides the Sonoran desert scrub, the refuge contains wetland, farmland, shoreline, and open water habitats. Several refuge habitats are intensively managed. Ponds, forests, and agricultural fields are designed, developed and manipulated to achieve wildlife objectives.

=== Managed Habitats ===
As of 2020, the refuge has 826 acres (334 ha) of manageable wetland units for resident and migratory bird species. Some specified impoundments are managed as permanent wetlands to provide critical nesting and year-round habitat for the endangered Yuma Ridgeway’s rail, while others are geared towards the propagation of plants favorable for food and cover through periodic flash flooding in the spring and summer months. All wetlands are flooded from water supplied by the Imperial Irrigation District. This water is termed “class 1” irrigation water, which is free of fertilizers, toxic pesticides and high levels of salts that are common in agricultural drain water. Salt cedar (Tamarix pentandra) and sesbania (Sesbania exalta) are problem weed species that often accompany moist soil management on the refuge.

The refuge manages tree rows to promote native species and biodiversity. Species planted include honey mesquite, screwbean mesquite, blue palo verde, Mexican palo verde, fairy duster, sweet acacia, catclaw acacia, and desert ironwood. Tree rows continue to receive additional plantings throughout the year in order to add density and width, and to better meet wildlife and habitat objectives.

Wildlife management at the Sonny Bono Salton Sea NWR involves an intensive farming program to provide suitable forage for over 30,000 wintering geese and other migratory birds and wildlife. Croplands constitute 869 acres (352 ha) of the refuge, with many fields cooperatively farmed by local farmers. Crops planted on refuge land includes alfalfa, wheat, rye grass, milo, millet, and sudan grass. With use restrictions on the use of certain pesticides on the refuge, infestations of white flies, and the booming prices of sudan grass, many cooperative farmers have switched from planting alfalfa to sudan grass over the years. Sudan grass grows like a weed in the Imperial Valley and requires little to no use of pesticides.

=== Wildlife ===
Since its establishment in 1930, the refuge has become a safe haven for a diverse assortment of wildlife. Yet the Salton Sea has changed over the years with its increasing salinity and decreasing water levels. Up until 1960, enthralling species like the wood stork and roseate spoonbill could be seen in the hundreds foraging along and near the shoreline and roosting on tree snags. The refuge has documented over 519 different species of wildlife. Of those, at least 433 are birds, 41 are mammals, 22 are reptiles and amphibians, and 15 are fish. While most of the birds within the refuge are migratory and use the refuge as a stop along the Pacific Flyway, an estimated 109 are year-round residents.

In addition to the categories below, the Sea is also inhabited by a large number of barnacles and Corixidae.

==== Birds ====
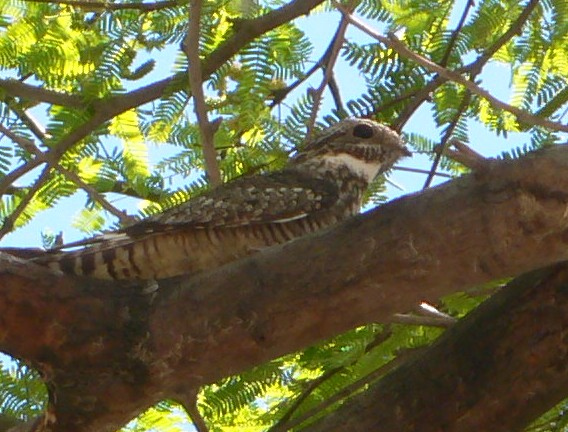
Lesser nighthawk at the refuge headquarters

Since its initial flooding, the Salton Sea has attracted a tremendous diversity of birdlife. As California's largest lake, the Salton Sea provides crucial feeding grounds for birds migrating from the Arctic to as far as South America. Many different species are drawn by the varied marine-like and freshwater habitats that can be found at this wetland oasis in the desert. Additionally, many bird species make the refuge their year-round home. On the refuge and immediate surrounding area, over 400 species of birds have been documented. The refuge is designated as an Important Bird Area by the American Bird Conservancy and a Regional Shorebird Reserve by the Western Hemisphere Shorebird Reserve Network.

The Salton Sea has been designated as an internationally important staging area for shorebirds. Over 124,000 shorebirds of at least 25 species migrate through the Salton Sea along the Pacific Flyway. It is considered the third most important shorebird habitat west of the Rocky Mountains. Several species rely heavily on the Salton Sea to support a large portion of their flyway population including: western sandpipers, willet, least sandpipers, American avocet, dowitcher spp., red-necked phalarope, whimbrel, and black-necked stilt.

Depending on the season, other common birds to find on the refuge include: California brown pelican, American white pelican, black skimmer, mountain plover, eared grebe, ruddy duck, yellow-footed gull, northern shoveler, Ross’s goose, snow goose, Gambel's quail, roadrunner, cattle egret, white-faced ibis, American kestrel, marsh wren, sandhill crane and hundreds more. Bird species of concern on the refuge include:

- Yuma Ridgway's rail (Rallus obsoletus): Listed by the IUCN as Near Threatened.
- Burrowing owl (Athene cunicularia): Species of concern in California. Owing to their large range and population size, they are listed by IUCN as Least Concern, though the population trend appears to be decreasing. More than 70 percent of the California population is found within the Imperial Valley.
- Gull-billed tern (Gelochelidon nilotica): Designated as a Bird of Conservation Concern.
- Mountain plover (Charadrius montanus): Listed by IUCN as a near threatened species.
- Western snowy plover (Charadrius nivosus): Listed by IUCN as near threatened. The Salton Sea supports the greatest number of western snowy plovers in the interior of California.

==== Mammals, Amphibians, Reptiles, and Fish ====
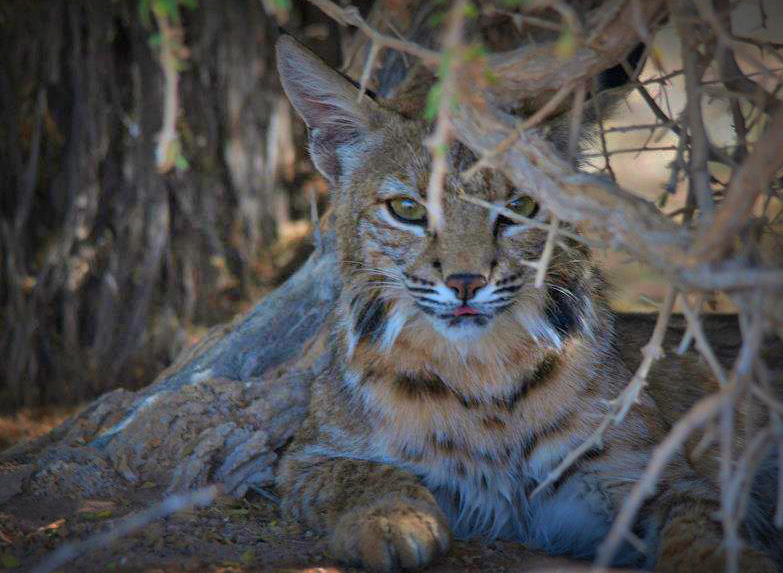
Bobcat at Sonny Bono National Wildlife Refuge

Common species of mammals found on the refuge include: desert cottontail, Merriam's kangaroo rat, muskrat, raccoon, valley pocket gopher, striped skunk, coyote, bobcat, round-tailed ground squirrel, desert pocket mouse and various bat species. Visibility varies greatly from species to species due to the nocturnal habits of some and seasonal hibernation of others. Most rodent species exist in terrestrial habitats. During winter months, rodents provide food for heron and egret species as well. Muskrats are present in freshwater drains and ponds where their feeding and burrowing activities help maintain marsh habitats for various other wildlife species.

Due to environmental factors, amphibians are not found in large numbers or diversity at the Sonny Bono Salton Sea NWR. Species occurring on the refuge include bullfrogs and lowland leopard frogs. Lowland leopard frogs respond well to shallow, permanent wetland habitat created for the Yuma Ridgway's rail. They are not present elsewhere on the Refuge due to competition from exotic bullfrogs. Woodhouse's toad and red-spotted toads are also found on the refuge.

Many different species of reptiles occur on the refuge. Common species include the gopher snake, western diamondback snake, coachwhip, common kingsnake, whiptail lizard, desert spiny lizard and side-blotched lizard. The spiny soft-shell turtle and the desert tortoise are also found on the refuge. Spiny soft-shell turtles are found in freshwater drains and ponds, while the desert tortoise, although rarely seen, can be found in the upland desert areas.

Fish were initially brought into the lake with the water that originated from the Colorado River and included native species, such as carp, rainbow trout, striped mullet, humpback sucker, and desert pupfish. As early as the 1930s, native fish had begun to die off because they couldn’t tolerate the high salinity. Periodically, decomposition of large algal blooms diminishes the dissolved oxygen in the water. This decomposition has been tied to occasional fish die-offs that occur throughout the year. Tilapia are among recent fish to be stocked in the sea, but with a growing salt content, even they are becoming scarce. The endangered Desert pupfish (Cyprinodon macularius), while present in the Sea, is rarely seen. The desert pupfish was listed as endangered by the U.S. Fish and Wildlife Service on March 31, 1986.

=== Conservation & Management Issues ===
The Salton Sea has few natural inlets of water, has no natural outlets, and is largely sustained by agricultural runoff from farmlands in the Imperial and Coachella Valleys. In recent decades, agricultural runoff to the Salton Sea has diminished due to decreasing agricultural inflows, evaporation, and reduced precipitation, causing the sea to shrink and increase in salinity. High salinity levels, combined with greater concentrations of nutrients and toxins, have altered the sea's ecosystem and surrounding habitat, making it difficult for most fish and bird species to survive. The Salton Sea's diminishing size also has exposed lake bed (i.e. playa) around the sea's shoreline; this playa contains toxic substances that may circulate in the air and impair local and regional air quality.

Over time, federal, state, and private entities have developed proposals to manage and restore parts of the Salton Sea. These efforts have common objectives, including controlling salinity, maintaining some of the sea's habitat, and stabilizing sea water levels. The current and most prominent restoration initiative, the Salton Sea Management Program (SSMP), was released by the State of California in 2017. The SSMP's first phase is being implemented from 2018 to 2028. The Initiative includes activities to convey water to the Salton Sea, reduce salinity in the sea, and restore approximately 30,000 acres (12,000 ha) of exposed playa. Phase 1 is estimated to cost $420 million. Some federal agencies, such as the Bureau of Reclamation (part of the Department of the Interior), are collaborating with the State of California to implement the SSMP.

The federal role in restoring the Salton Sea is limited to a handful of projects that address issues on lands in and around the sea managed by federal agencies such as the U.S. Fish and Wildlife Service, the Bureau of Reclamation, the Bureau of Land Management, and the Department of Defense. Unlike in areas such as Lake Tahoe, the Everglades, and the Chesapeake Bay, Congress has not authorized a comprehensive program to restore the Salton Sea.

On the refuge lands, U.S. Fish and Wildlife Service staff uses a variety of habitat management techniques to maintain, recover or enhance plant and wildlife values. The refuge was designed to reduce waterfowl depredation to adjacent croplands. Management practices include an intensive farming program that involves cooperative farmers. Crops are grown for waterfowl consumption during the winter. The refuge also manipulates water levels in ponds to provide ideal habitat for shorebirds and waterfowl. More recently, Salton Sea Refuge has become heavily involved with fish and wildlife disease and contaminant issues. The refuge routinely surveys the Salton Sea for dead or dying fish and wildlife. Fish and wildlife are removed from the area in order to prevent the spread of disease and sent to the lab for investigation. Ground and aerial wildlife surveys are conducted throughout the year to inventory populations and document habitat use. Prescribed burning techniques are used to help native plants recover.

== Recreation ==
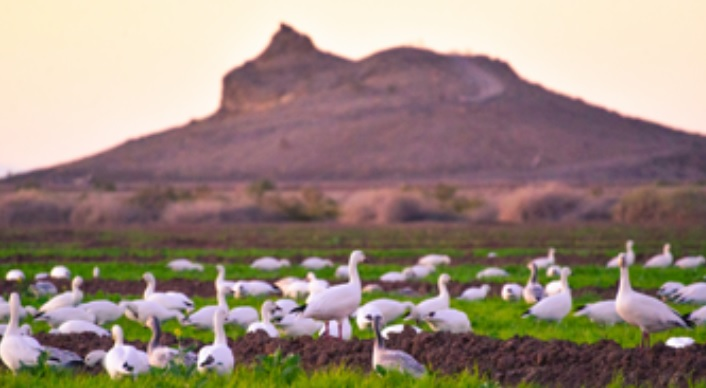
Snow Geese with Rock Hill in background at the Sonny Bono Salton Sea National Wildlife Refuge

The refuge has two walking trails: the Rock Hill Trail and the Michael Hardenberger Trail. The Rock Hill Trail is approximately 2 miles (3.2 km) roundtrip, leading visitors through several different habitats. It begins next to the picnic area at the Visitor Center and ends on the top of Rock Hill (33°11′0″N 115°37′23″W), which is located on the edge of the Salton Sea.

The Michael Hardenberger Trail is located at Unit 1 off Vendel Road, which is at the south end of the Salton Sea. The ½-mile trail encircles one of the freshwater ponds, a favorite nesting spot for the endangered Yuma clapper rail.

The refuge offers several sites for waterfowl hunting from October through February in accordance with the State of California regulations.

== See also ==
- Salton Sea State Recreation Area
- Salton Sink
- Imperial National Wildlife Refuge
