= Imperial National Wildlife Refuge =

Nature preserve in Arizona and California

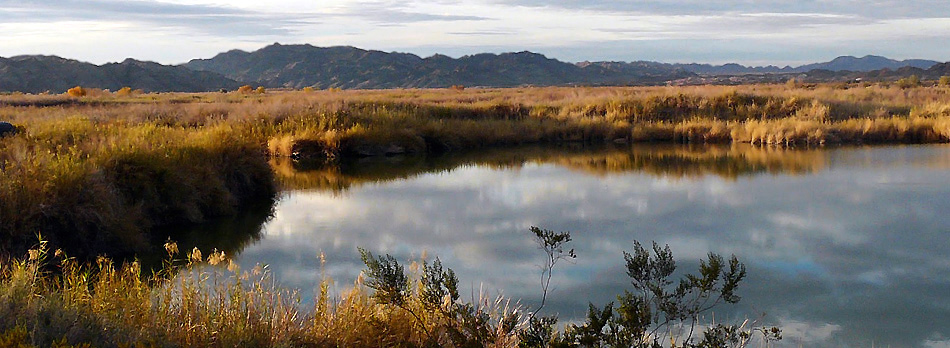

- Location within the United States
- Location: Imperial County, California, La Paz County, Arizona, and Yuma County, Arizona, United States
- Nearest city: Martinez Lake, Arizona
- Coordinates: 33°0′N 114°30′W
- Area: 25,768 acres (104 km^{2})
- Established: 1941
- Governing body: U.S. Fish and Wildlife Service
- Website: Imperial National Wildlife Refuge

The Imperial National Wildlife Refuge protects wildlife habitat along 30 miles (50 km) of the lower Colorado River in Arizona and California, including the last un-channeled section before the river enters Mexico. The Imperial Refuge Wilderness, a federally designated, 15,056-acre (60.93 km^{2}), wilderness area is protected within the refuge. It also surrounds the Picacho State Recreation Area. This section of the Colorado River is popular for boating, hiking, fishing, camping, exploring old mining camps and wildlife watching.

The river and its associated backwater lakes and wetlands are a green oasis, contrasting with the surrounding desert mountains. It is a refuge and breeding area for migratory birds and local desert wildlife.

== Wildlife ==
Even though it is located in the Sonoran Desert, the Imperial National Wildlife Refuge is home to a mostly wetland environment. Wetland wildlife is most abundant in winter, when birds such as cinnamon teal and northern pintail use the refuge. During the summer months, permanent residents such as great egrets are abundant. The Colorado River plays a vital role in the lives of desert fauna. It is the only water source for many miles. Small animals such as the black-tailed jackrabbit and western whiptail lizard are plentiful. Desert bighorn sheep and mule deer also call the refuge home.

=== Birds ===
- Common loon
- Western grebe
- Blue-footed booby
- Brown booby
- American white pelican
- Brown pelican
- Double-crested cormorant
- Great blue heron
- Great egret
- Snowy egret
- Wood stork
- Canada goose
- Wood duck
- Mallard
- Northern pintail
- Cinnamon teal
- Turkey vulture
- Osprey
- Bald eagle
- Red-tailed hawk
- American kestrel
- Peregrine falcon
- Gambel's quail
- Sandhill crane
- Killdeer
- California gull
- Common tern
- Mourning dove
- Common ground-dove
- Yellow-billed cuckoo
- Greater roadrunner
- Barn owl
- Great horned owl
- Burrowing owl
- White-throated swift
- Hummingbird
- Belted kingfisher
- Gila woodpecker
- Tree swallow
- Barn swallow
- Woodhouse's scrub jay
- Common raven
- Brown creeper
- Cactus wren
- Marsh wren
- Northern mockingbird
- House finch

A full list of birds found on the refuge can be found on the refuge website.

=== Forest in the Desert ===
At one time, the banks of the Colorado River were lined with cottonwood and willow forests, sustained by the river’s natural periodic flooding. Animals depended on this green forest oasis for breeding, resting, feeding, and shade. Woodcutting during the steamboat era, clearing for agriculture, wild fire, exotic plants like salt cedar, and use of dams for flood prevention have devastated cottonwood and willow stands along the lower Colorado River. Some animals that depended on the riparian forests, such as the southwestern willow flycatcher (Empidonax traillii extimus), have become endangered.

== Trails ==
The Painted Desert Trail, a National Recreation Trail, is a 1.3-mile self-guided trail for an opportunity to see desert plants and wildlife. The trail takes you through a rainbow of colors left by 30,000-year-old volcanic activity and features a panoramic view of the Colorado River valley.

== See also ==
- Colorado River
- Colorado Desert
- Yuma Desert
- Lower Colorado River Valley
- Sonny Bono Salton Sea National Wildlife Refuge
