= Salton Sea State Recreation Area =

Protected area in California

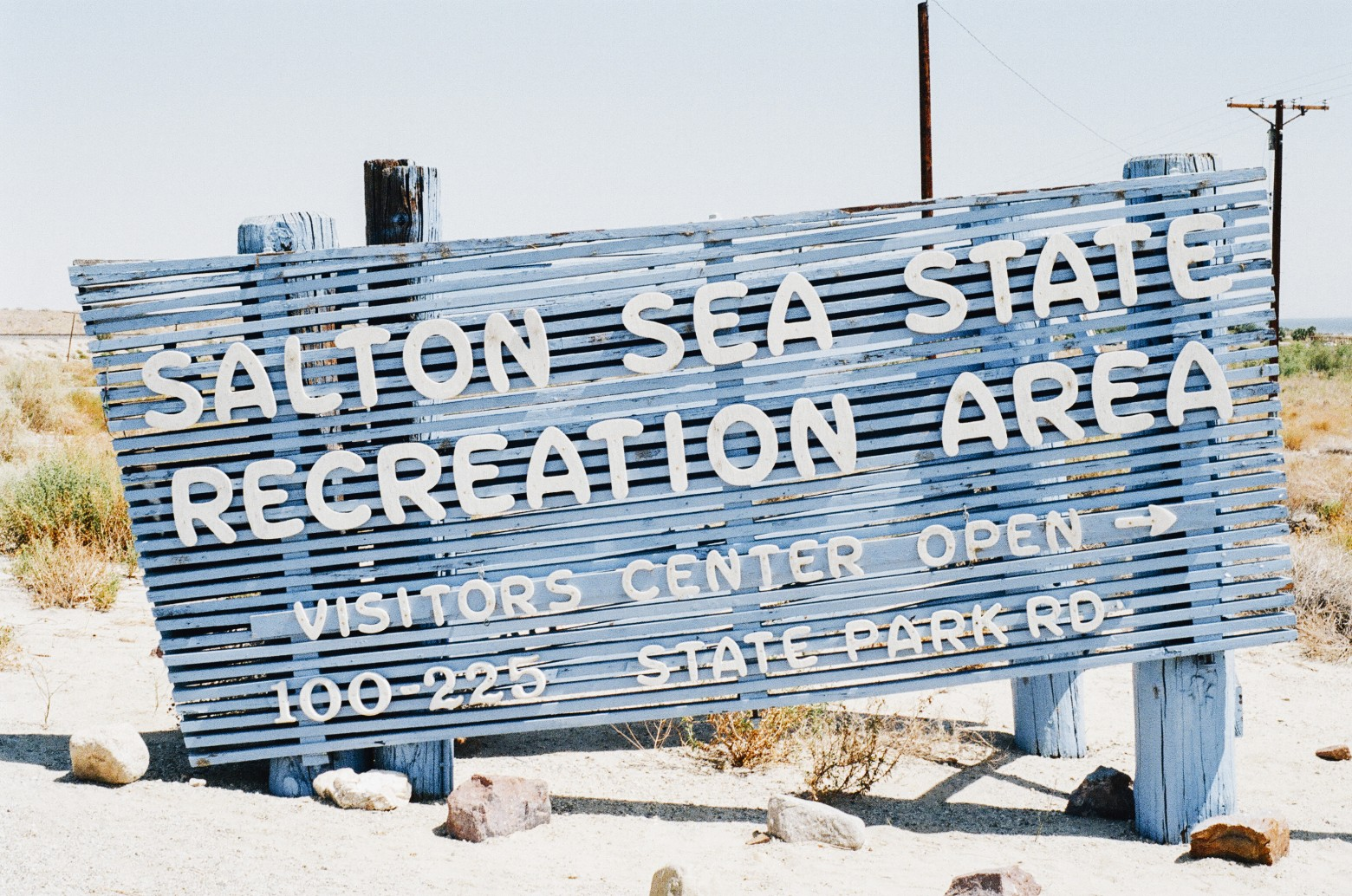
- Entrance sign to the visitor center on Hwy 111
- Interactive map of Salton Sea State Recreation Area
- Location: Eastern Coachella Valley, United States
- Nearest city: North Shore, California
- Coordinates: 33°28′27″N 115°53′20.4″W
- Established: 1955
- Governing body: California Department of Parks and Recreation

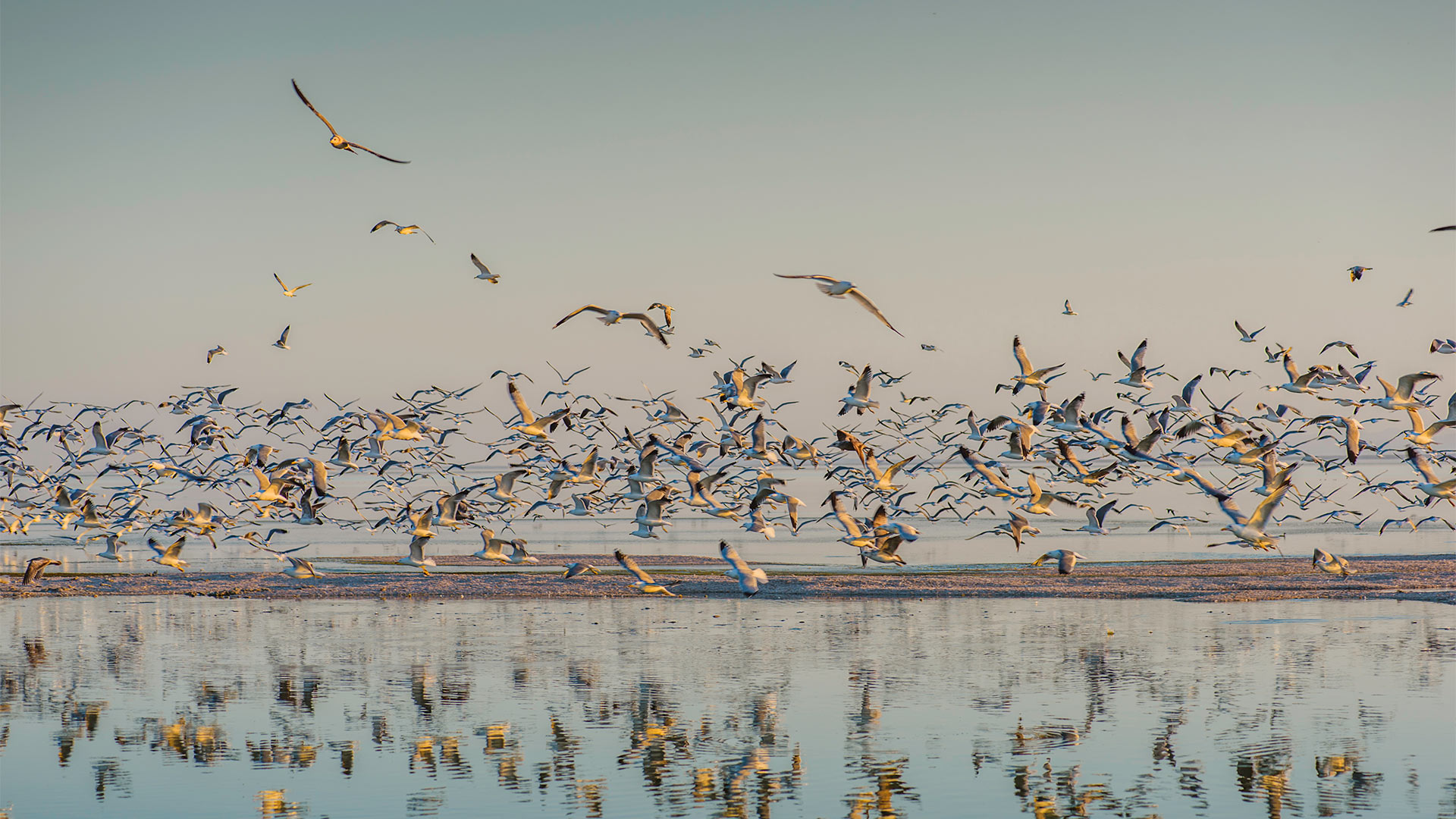
Birds at the Salton Sea State Recreation Area

The Salton Sea State Recreation Area offers hunting, fishing, swimming, and camping to visitors on the northeastern side of the Salton Sea.

== Recreation ==
The Salton Sea State Recreation Area is run by the California Department of Parks and Recreation.

The visitors center is located on the north side of the park, on California State Route 111. The Corvina Beach Campground, is situated near the center of the park.

The recreation area was one of the 48 California state parks proposed for closure in January 2008 by California's Governor Arnold Schwarzenegger as part of a deficit reduction program, not enacted then. The Recreation Area continues to be open to the public.

== Flora and fauna ==
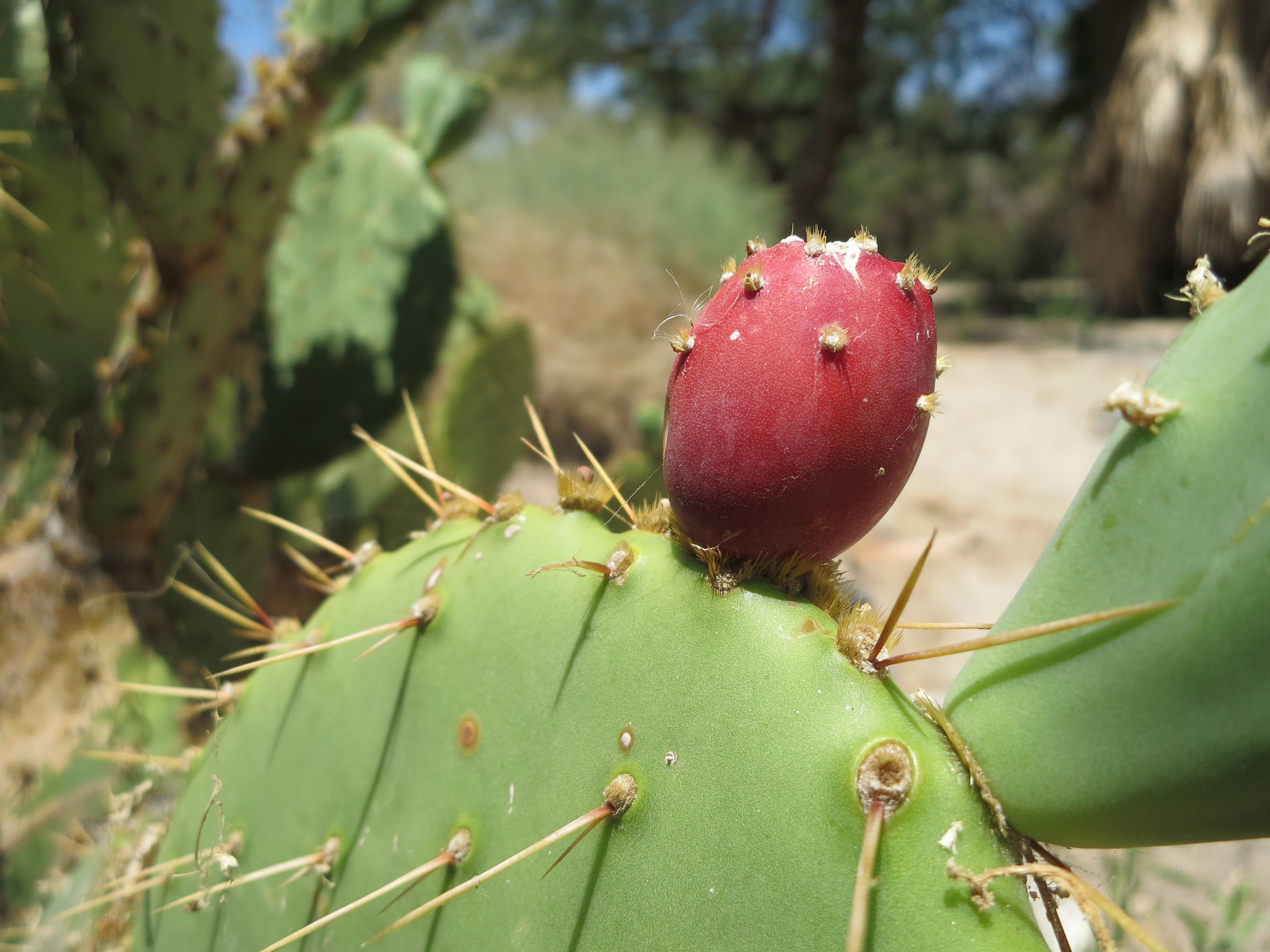
Mojave Prickly-Pear Cactus at the Native Garden in Salton Sea State Recreation Area

The Salton Sea Recreation Area is in the Colorado Desert section of the Sonoran Desert, in the Lower Colorado River Valley geographic region. The Salton Sea is a stop on a major flyway for migrating birds.

- List of flora of the Sonoran Desert Region by common name

== See also ==
- Sonny Bono Salton Sea National Wildlife Refuge
- Salton Sink
