= Palm Canyon =

Palm Canyon may refer to:

== Australia ==
- Palm Valley (Northern Territory), formerly known as Palm Canyon.

== United States ==
- Palm Canyon (Arizona), in the Kofa National Wildlife Refuge
- Palm Canyon (California), above Palm Springs, in Riverside County, California.
- Borrego Palm Canyon, in Anza-Borrego Desert State Park, California
- Old Palm Canyon, in Yuma County, Arizona.
- Palm Canyon Drive—California State Route 111, in the western Coachella Valley and a principal boulevard through Palm Springs, in Riverside County, California.
