= Picacho State Recreation Area =

California protected area

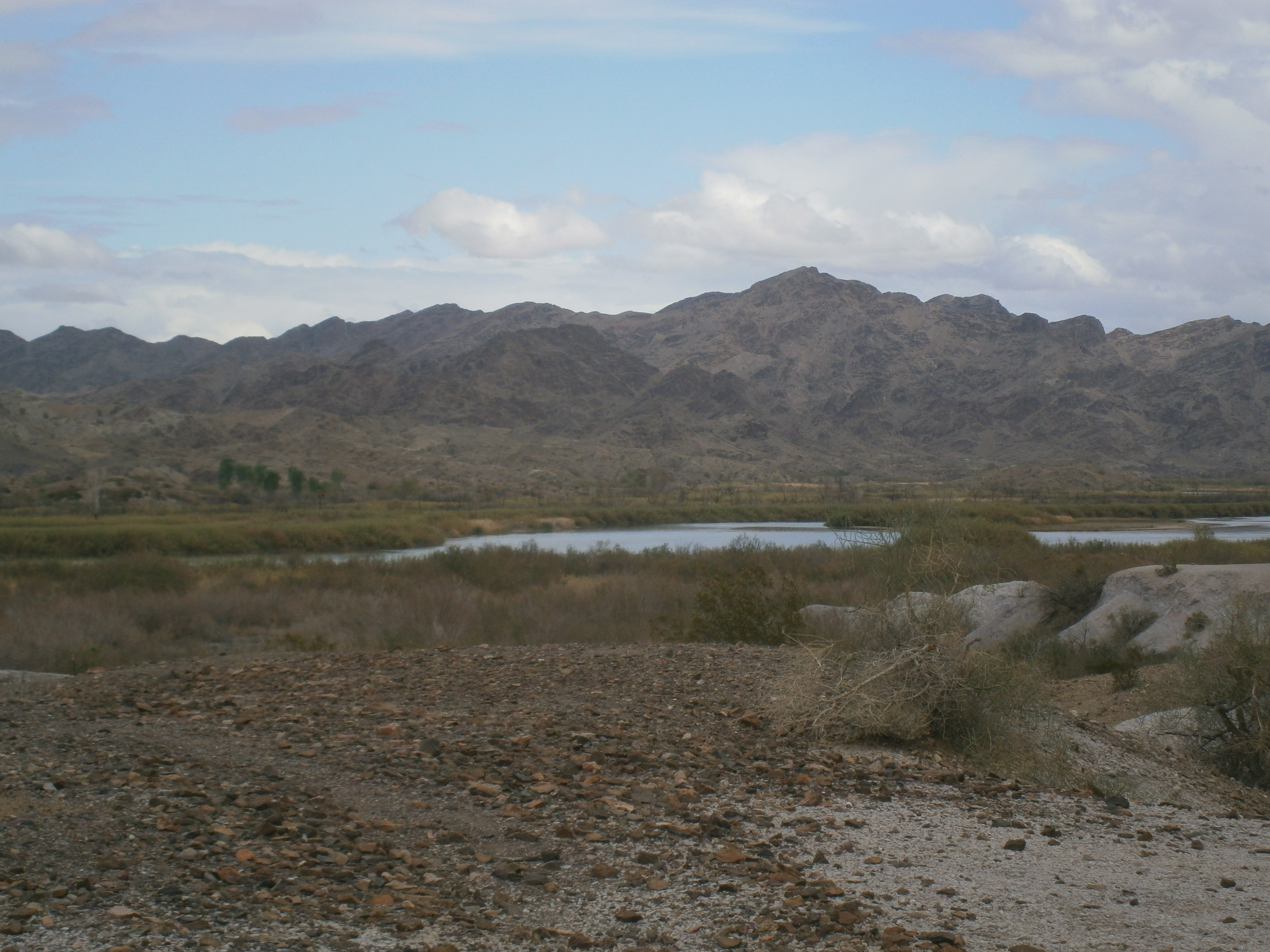
- Interactive map of Picacho State Recreation Area
- Location: Imperial County, California, United States
- Nearest city: Winterhaven, California
- Coordinates: 33°1′30.53″N 114°36′32.21″W

Picacho State Recreation Area is a camping, boating, and general recreation area located on a 9-mile stretch of the lower Colorado River at the site of Picacho, a defunct gold mining town.

Picacho is a popular wintertime/springtime destination for boating, fishing, hiking and camping. This remote park is located in the far southeastern corner of California and includes 54 campsites, 3 boat launches, and 5 river camps. Favorite activities at the park include stargazing, and bird and wildlife viewing (including the famous desert resident, the Bighorn sheep).

The mining town of Picacho sat on this spot in the early 1900s. The remains of a stamp mill that was used to crush the gold ore during mining operations is a popular hiking destination.

This section of the Colorado River is a popular stopover for migratory waterfowl - ducks, geese, ibis and cormorants - usually seen by the thousands in spring and fall. Other waterfowl are found here year round.

The Bureau of Land Management and the Bureau of Reclamation lease the land to California State Parks for the operation of the recreation area.

== Proposed for closure ==
Picacho State Recreation Area is one of the 48 California state parks proposed for closure in January 2008 by California's Governor Arnold Schwarzenegger as part of a deficit reduction program.

Closure again seemed imminent in 2012 as a part of California's sweeping 70-park closure plan. However, Picacho SRA was never closed, and is fully operational as of 2013. A non-profit group Friends4Picacho was formed in 2012 to promote its continued operation.

== Fish species ==
- Largemouth Bass
- Smallmouth Bass
- Striped Bass
- Crappie
- Bullhead
- Catfish (Channel)
- Catfish (Flathead)
- Tilapia
- Redear Sunfish
- Green Sunfish
- Bluegill Sunfish
- Carp
- Bullfrogs

== General information ==
- Average Depth: 8 ft
- Fishable Miles: 94
- Elevation: 230 ft
