= Slab City, California =

American alternative lifestyle community

Slab City
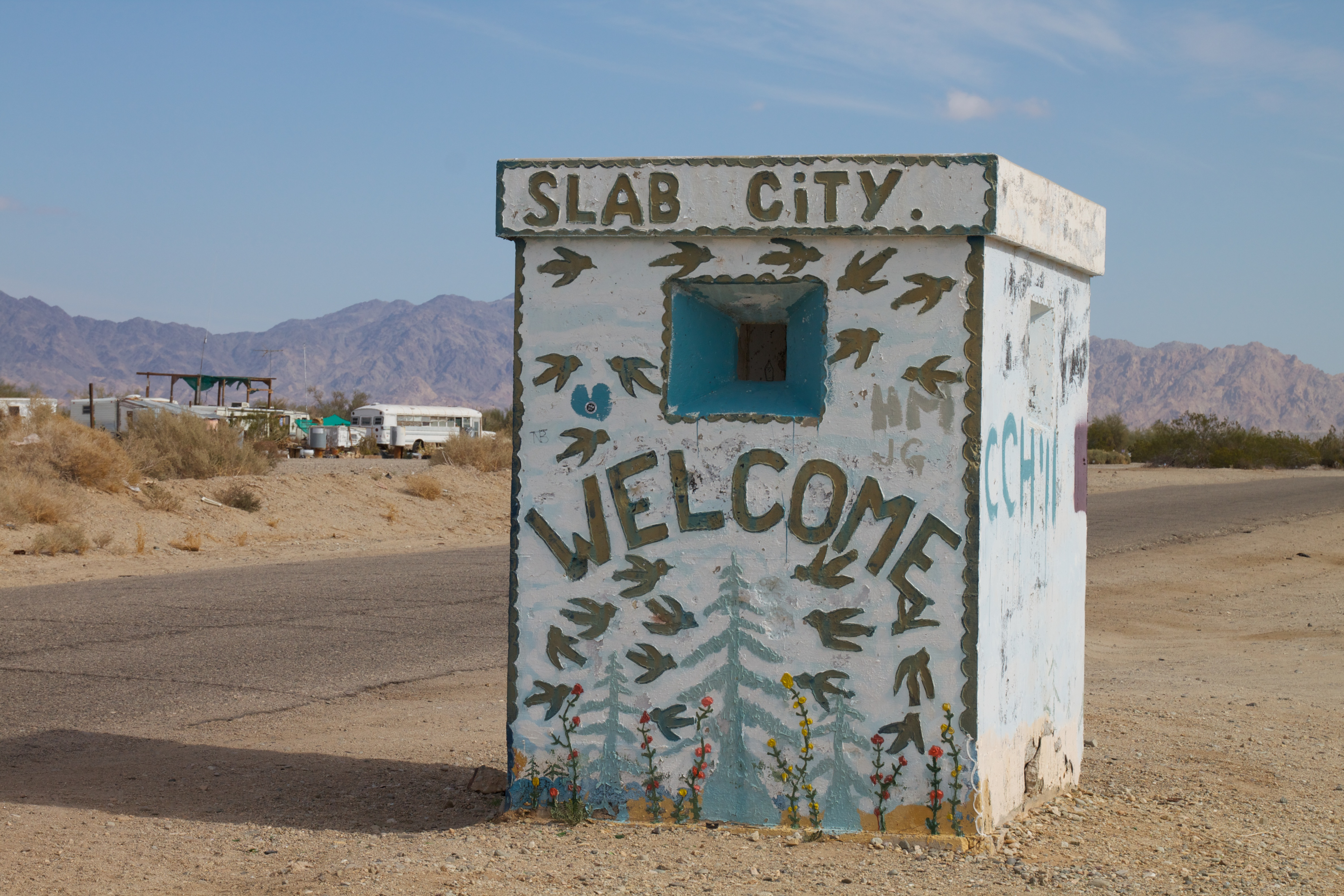
- The Second Guardshack, originally installed as a security measure by the United States Marine Corps, now painted with a sign welcoming visitors to Slab City

- Location within California Location within the United States
- Location: Mojave Desert, California (4 miles northeast of Niland)
- Coordinates: 33°15′27″N 115°27′45″W
- Operated by: Chasterus Foundation
- Established: 1942
- Slogan: “The last free place”
- Website: slab-city.com (archived)

Slab City, also called The Slabs, is an unincorporated, off-the-grid alternative lifestyle community consisting largely of snowbirds in the Salton Trough area of the Mojave Desert in Imperial County, California. It took its name from concrete slabs that remained after the World War II Marine Corps Camp Dunlap training camp was torn down. Slab City is known for attracting people who want to live outside mainstream society.

== History ==
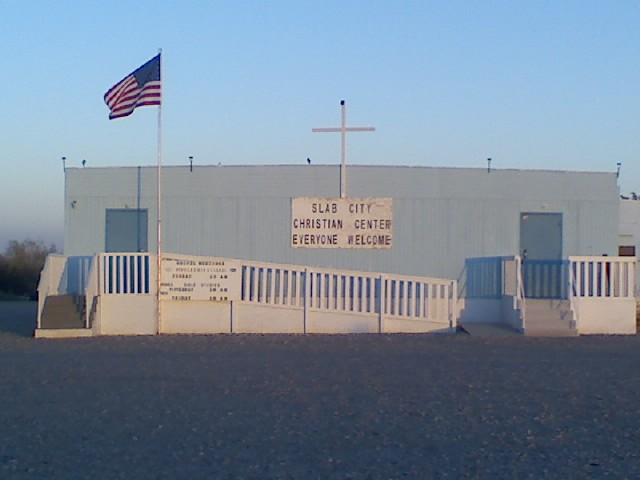
The Slab City Christian Center in October 2007

Prior to the United States' official entry into World War II, the United States Marine Corps planned a training ground for field and anti-aircraft artillery units in an area accessible by aircraft taking off from carriers near San Diego. To create the training base, 631 acres (255 ha) were obtained. The government announced that the base was to be named after Marine Corps Brigadier General Robert Henry Dunlap. After construction of Camp Dunlap was completed, it was commissioned on October 15, 1942. The camp had fully functioning buildings, water, roads, and sewage collections. The base was used for three years during the war. By 1949, military operations at Camp Dunlap had been greatly reduced, but a skeleton crew continued on until the base was dismantled. By 1956, all buildings had been dismantled, but the concrete slabs remained.

The area that is now Slab City was the artillery training range for the Camp. It was first settled by a few veterans who had worked at the Marine base, followed later by drifters – then recreational vehicle owners, searching for free camping spots outside Palm Springs. Current residents refer to themselves as Slabbies while tourists are called Normies.

As of October 6, 1961, a quitclaim deed conveying the land to the State of California was issued by the Department of Defense as it was determined the land was no longer required. The deed did not contain any restrictions, recapture clauses, or restoration provisions. All of the former Camp Dunlap buildings had been removed. The remaining slabs were not proposed for removal. Later, legislation required that revenue generated from this property would go to the California State Teachers' Retirement System.

Slab City's popularity surged after an article was printed in Trailer Life and RV Magazine around 1984. A 1988 San Diego Reader reports there were no more than 600–700 RVs around 1983, and one resident estimated there were about 2000 trailers when he was interviewed in March, 1988.

Leonard Knight, an early settler who created the Salvation Mountain art installation, was featured in Sean Penn's Into the Wild, released in 2007. An obituary of Knight stated that he "spent almost 30 years building the colorful mountain ... Built out of adobe and donated paint, Knight worked on the mountain all day, every day. He even slept at the mountain's base in the back of a pick-up truck, with no electricity or running water".

An article in Smithsonian magazine in October 2018 referred to the community as a "Squatters’ Paradise" which locals consider to be "one of America's last free places." The article said of the population: "There are clearly people there who don’t want to be found, so there’s something about disappearing, and the desert offers that kind of opportunity."

== Geography ==
Slab City is located on roughly 640 acres (260 hectares; 2.6 square kilometres) of public land, near the east shore of the Salton Sea. It is 100 miles (160 kilometers) northeast of San Diego, 169 mi (272 km) southeast of Los Angeles and about 50 mi (80 km) from Mexico. To the east of Slab City is Coachella Canal, which is fenced, but the fence gets cut open periodically, especially at Slab City, according to the Coachella Valley Water District.

=== Climate ===
The area has a large amount of sunshine year round, due to its stable descending air and high pressure. According to the Köppen climate classification system, Slab City has a hot desert climate, BWh on climate maps.

Climate data for Niland (130 feet below sea level)
Month	Jan	Feb	Mar	Apr	May	Jun	Jul	Aug	Sep	Oct	Nov	Dec	Year
Record high °F (°C)	89 (32)	97 (36)	104 (40)	108 (42)	116 (47)	121 (49)	122 (50)	120 (49)	121 (49)	111 (44)	100 (38)	93 (34)	122 (50)
Mean daily maximum °F (°C)	71 (22)	74 (23)	80 (27)	86 (30)	95 (35)	103 (39)	107 (42)	107 (42)	102 (39)	91 (33)	79 (26)	70 (21)	89 (32)
Daily mean °F (°C)	56 (13)	59 (15)	64.5 (18.1)	70 (21)	77.5 (25.3)	85 (29)	91 (33)	92 (33)	86 (30)	75 (24)	63.5 (17.5)	55 (13)	72.9 (22.7)
Mean daily minimum °F (°C)	41 (5)	44 (7)	49 (9)	54 (12)	60 (16)	67 (19)	75 (24)	77 (25)	70 (21)	59 (15)	48 (9)	40 (4)	57 (14)
Record low °F (°C)	19 (−7)	25 (−4)	28 (−2)	35 (2)	40 (4)	27 (−3)	55 (13)	59 (15)	50 (10)	30 (−1)	11 (−12)	22 (−6)	11 (−12)
Average precipitation inches (mm)	0.48 (12)	0.55 (14)	0.33 (8.4)	0.05 (1.3)	0.02 (0.51)	0.00 (0.00)	0.08 (2.0)	0.21 (5.3)	0.16 (4.1)	0.25 (6.4)	0.19 (4.8)	0.48 (12)	2.8 (70.81)
Source: Weather Channel

== Demographics ==
The Washington Post reported in 2020 that population is seasonal, and balloons up to about 4,000 during the winter, by some estimates, and dwindles to about 150 in the summer. Since the 1950s, Slab City has drawn a variety of people, such as anarchists, artists, eccentrics, outcasts, retirees, and the impoverished. A 1990 Chicago Tribune article by a journalist who stayed in the camp for a week estimated that winter residents (at the time) were mostly senior citizens over 60 years old. It is a "popular winter destination for transients." Slab City is used by recreational vehicle owners, travellers, and squatters from across North America, including Canada.

== Economy ==
According to the San Diego Union-Tribune's Fred Dickey in 2012, the most common source of income among the permanent residents is "probably" SSI checks. In 2020, Ranker indicated that Slab City's income mainly comes from tourists and donations. In 1995, almost every resident of Slab City collected disability benefits, social security or unemployment. Another steady source of income at the time was selling salvaged goods to visitors.

Many residents use generators or solar panels to generate electricity. Clean water is dispensed from a tank at the community church. The closest body of civilization with proper law enforcement is approximately four miles (six kilometers) southwest of Slab City, in Niland, where residents often went for basic shopping as of 1990. Residents were still obtaining essentials from Niland, a town of about 1,000, 30 years later in 2020.

== Arts and culture ==
=== Tourism ===
Slab City has a free lending library and an outdoor music venue called The Range.

The settlement also has an internet cafe, a hostel, and a skatepark built inside what remains of the military base swimming pool.

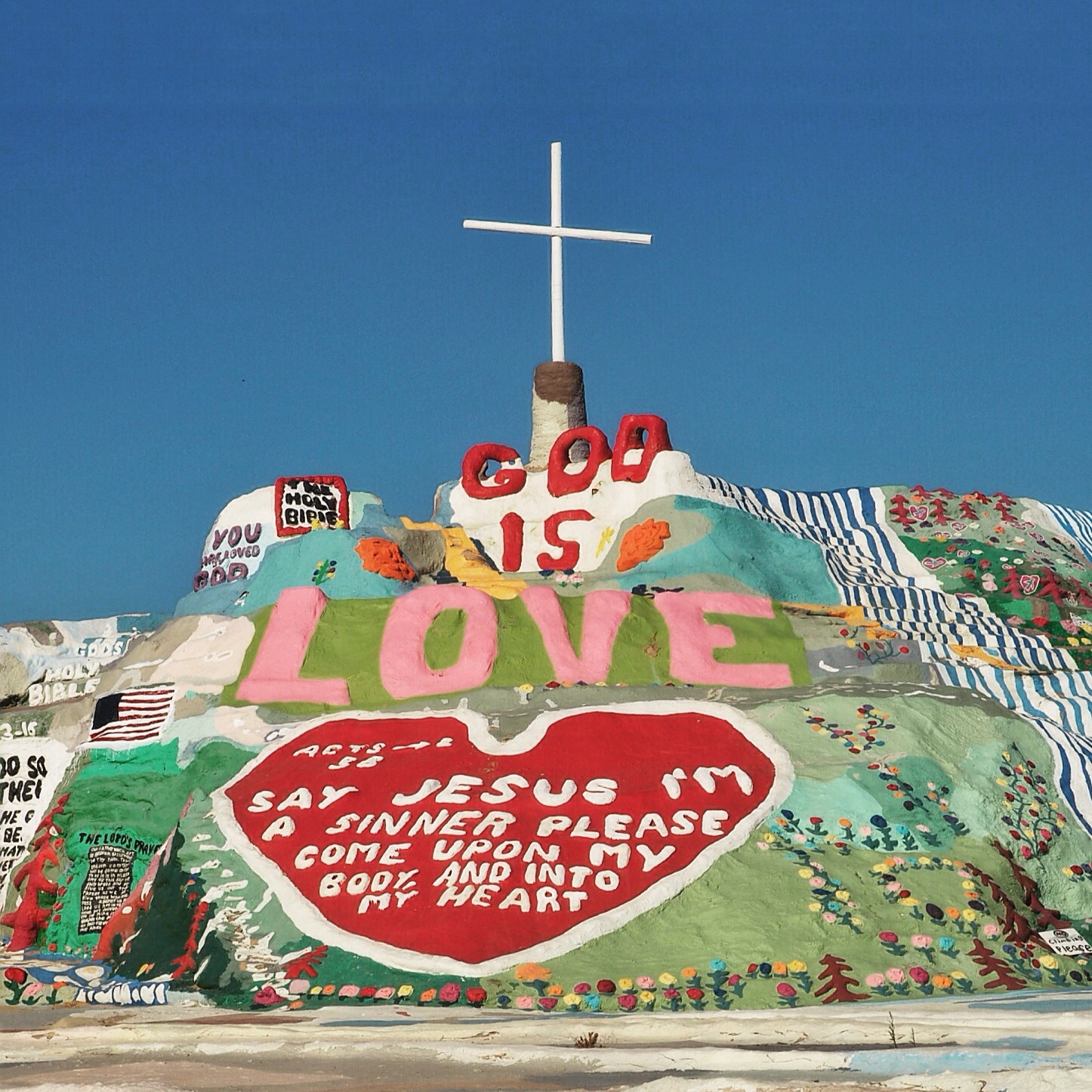
Salvation Mountain – God is Love; 2015 photo

During the 2020 pandemic, most tourist destinations, including Salvation Mountain, The Range, and Slab City's Library, were closed.

==== Salvation Mountain ====
Located just east of California State Route 111, the entrance to Slab City is easily recognized by the colorful Salvation Mountain, which is a small hill approximately three stories tall and entirely covered in latex paint, concrete and adobe, and festooned with Bible verses. It was a project built over two decades by Slab City resident Leonard Knight. The work is a 50 ft-tall piece of religious folk art, "an unofficial centrepiece for the community and [cementing] the area’s anarchic creative identity," according to a 2020 report.

In 2002, Salvation Mountain was named a Congressional National Folk-Art Treasure.

The current Salvation Mountain is actually the second construction to occupy the site; Knight began the first Salvation Mountain in 1984, using highly unstable construction methods that allowed the mountain to collapse in 1989. Knight was not discouraged; he rebuilt the structure using better materials and engineering, including adobe mixed with straw.

Before his death on February 10, 2014, Knight had been living in a nursing home. He was able to visit Salvation Mountain for the last time in May 2013; the visit was recorded by KPBS (TV).

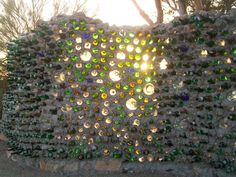
Bottle wall at East Jesus

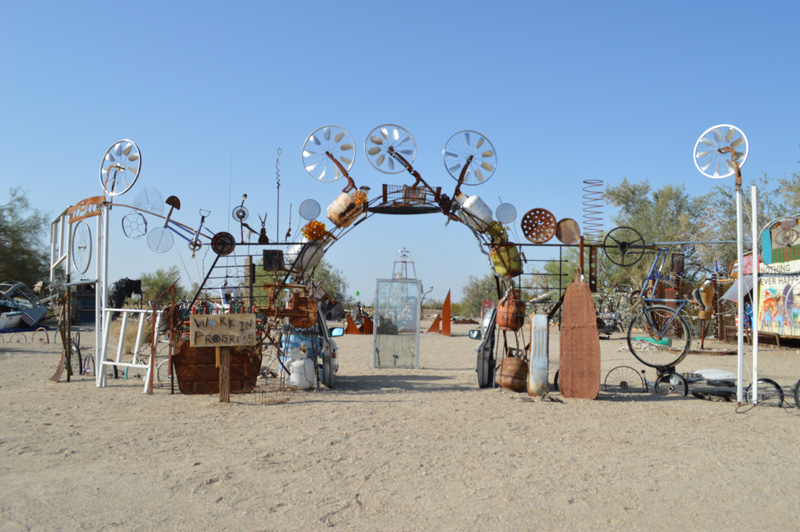
"East Jesus" sculpture garden entry

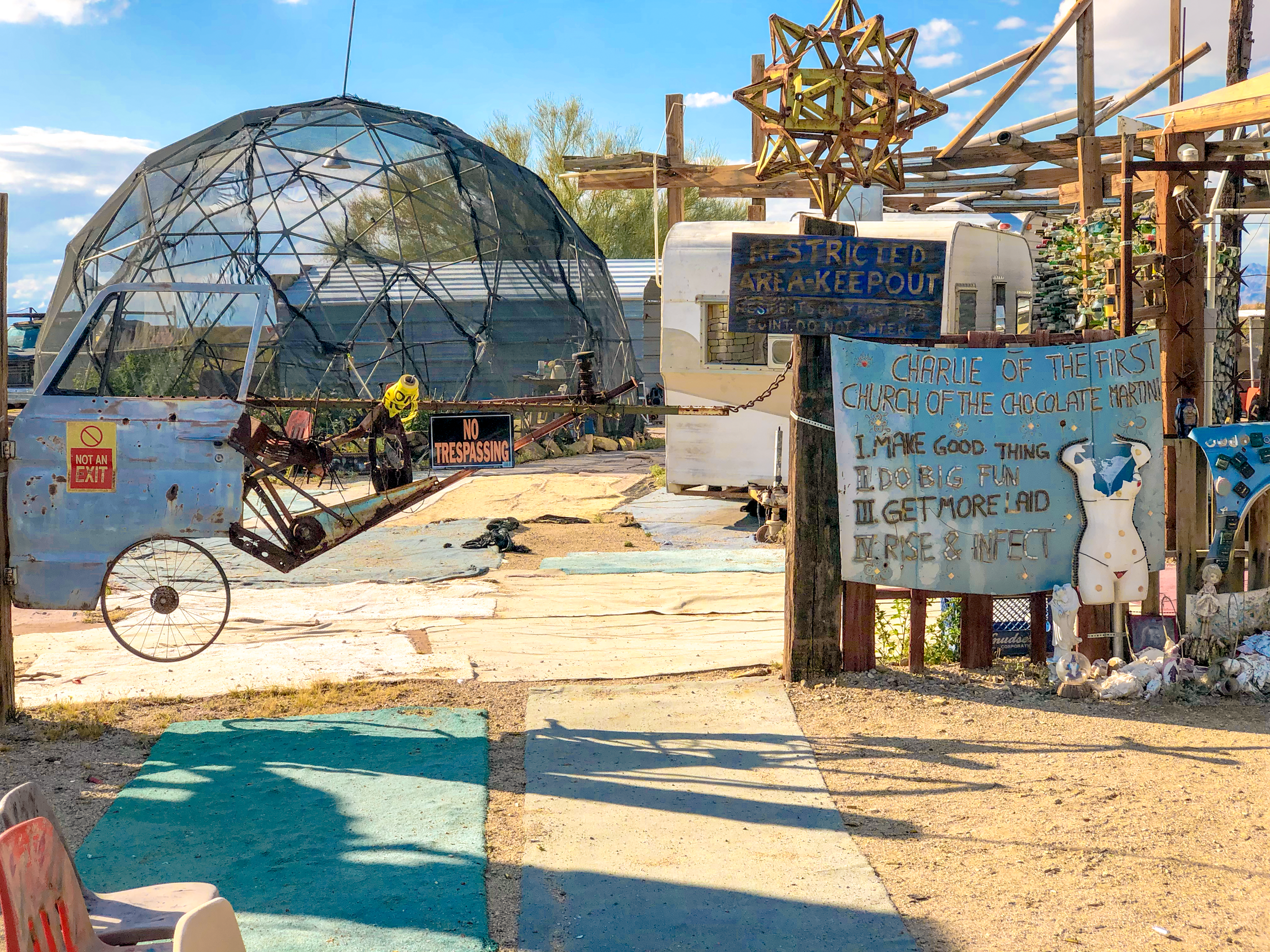
Residential compound at East Jesus

==== East Jesus ====
East Jesus is an experimental and habitable art installation located in the Slab City area. There is no religious connotation in the name East Jesus – it is a colloquialism for a place in the middle of nowhere beyond the edge of serviceability. The off-grid facility operates with no municipal utilities.

In early 2007, Charlie Russell left his job in the technology industry, packed all his belongings into a shipping container, and sent it to a trash-strewn field, where he began to surround his two cars with sculptures. Russell, often called Container Charlie, renamed this settlement site East Jesus. He died in May 2011. The Chasterus Foundation, a 501(c)(3) non-profit formed after his death in 2011, has since guided the curation and expansion of East Jesus.

East Jesus features a variety of experimental art, such as live events, performance art, music, photography, and most prominently sculptures. Works are continually added, and degrade quickly in the desert climate, despite the presence of caretakers. One such volunteer referred to it, and Slab City as a whole, as a ‘salvagepunk’ ethos. East Jesus pieces are described as decaying, or growing, but always in a state of transformation -unlike traditional galleries- due both to the intense climate, and the thousands of contributing artists who have added to the installation. In 2014, live-in staff were giving dozens of free tours, and hosted visiting artists and overnight guests.

==== The Range ====
The Range is an open-air nightclub complete with stage, lights, amplifiers, and speakers, with tattered couches and old chairs for seating. Every Saturday night at around dusk, locals and visitors meet for a talent show that features permanent resident musicians and anyone else who wants to get on stage and perform. The venue is run by old-time resident William Ammon, known as "Builder Bill". Ammon's wife, Robin Ammon, collected old prom dresses for people to wear; these are used when the community puts on a prom, because many residents have never been able to actually attend one.

== Government ==
Dirt roads are graded by Imperial County and are regularly patrolled by the Imperial County Sheriff's Office, as well as by Border Patrol agents searching for undocumented immigrants as Slab City is about 50 miles (80 km) from Mexico. Fire service for Slab City is provided by the Niland Fire Department. School buses come from nearby communities to pick up the few children there.

== Community ==
Slab City is divided into a handful of neighborhoods with different characteristics. As of 2020, the community is largely divided into two: East Jesus and Slab City. Thousands of campers and RV owners, many retired, use the site during the winter months. The "snowbirds" stay only for the winter before migrating north in spring, to cooler climates. Despite the high temperatures, there are about 150 permanent residents of Slab City. Some of these "Slabbers" or "Year-Rounders" derive their living from government programs and have been driven to Slab City by poverty or job loss. Others have voluntarily moved, to learn how to live off the grid, or otherwise be isolated. "Builder Bill" Ammon described "a kind of segregation" between the older residents, who would exchange goods and services, and young residents, who are sometimes "ill-equipped" for self-sufficiency, or turn to petty theft and drug use.

As of a January 2020 report, Slab City is composed of "more than a dozen individual neighborhoods ... small camps of people with their own particular rules and culture." Amenities include The Range, a makeshift library, RV rental units, an internet cafe, and establishments that sell food, though most shopping is done at the town of Niland. One resident is reported to have run a weekly self-help group for women in the community. Residents talked about using CB radio as a bulletin board and adopting radio handles when they spoke to the Chicago Tribune in 1990. In 2005, a resident told a Los Angeles Times correspondent for the On The Streets documentary how he can just live however he wants.

During the COVID-19 pandemic, residents were heavily impacted by the loss of tourist income, which also provided food and water. Social distancing was also a difficulty, as many residents work closely to trade and maintain services. The pandemic was complicated by the elderly population, no health infrastructure within Slab City (the nearest hospital is 40 minutes away, in Brawley), a lack of insurance, a lack of running water and sanitation, and anti-governmental or conspiratorial beliefs. Residents raised concerns over a past failure to contain an outbreak of canine parvo. As of April 2020, Imperial County had not provided any specific assistance for vulnerable communities.

=== Crime ===
Crystal meth is fairly common and accounts for much of the crime in Slab City. In 2015, the New York Times reported that the usual cause for police response to Slab City is over camping boundary disputes, sometimes burglary, but that methamphetamine use is a recurrent problem. In December 2019, during the two-day Imperial Valley fugitive-seeking effort named Operation Valley Grinch, four fugitives hiding in Slab City were apprehended. The locals also cut the fence to unlawfully use Coachella Canal as a swimming spot.

== Future plans ==
Some reports claim that the land is owned by the State of California, while others from 1993 report that the land was purchased by a building contractor. As of 2021, California had not yet decided to sell the land, but the Lands Commission is considering having the land appraised, and, if needed, allow for cleanup due to military waste from the 1950s.

In 2015, several residents formed the Slab City Community Group in an effort to prevent a sale. The group explored obtaining 450 acres (180 ha) of Slab City in a trust, though this was a contentious issue with other residents. A May 2020 article confirmed that the state was hoping to sell the land. "A sale could potentially go to energy companies ... Many residents worry that a deal could leave them without a community or place to live, as the lawless Slab City has become the last resort for so many."

== See also ==
- Chocolate Mountain Aerial Gunnery Range
- Drop City
- Burning Man
