= Camp Dunlap =

Former US Marine Corps base in California

- Imperial County, California; Near Niland in United States
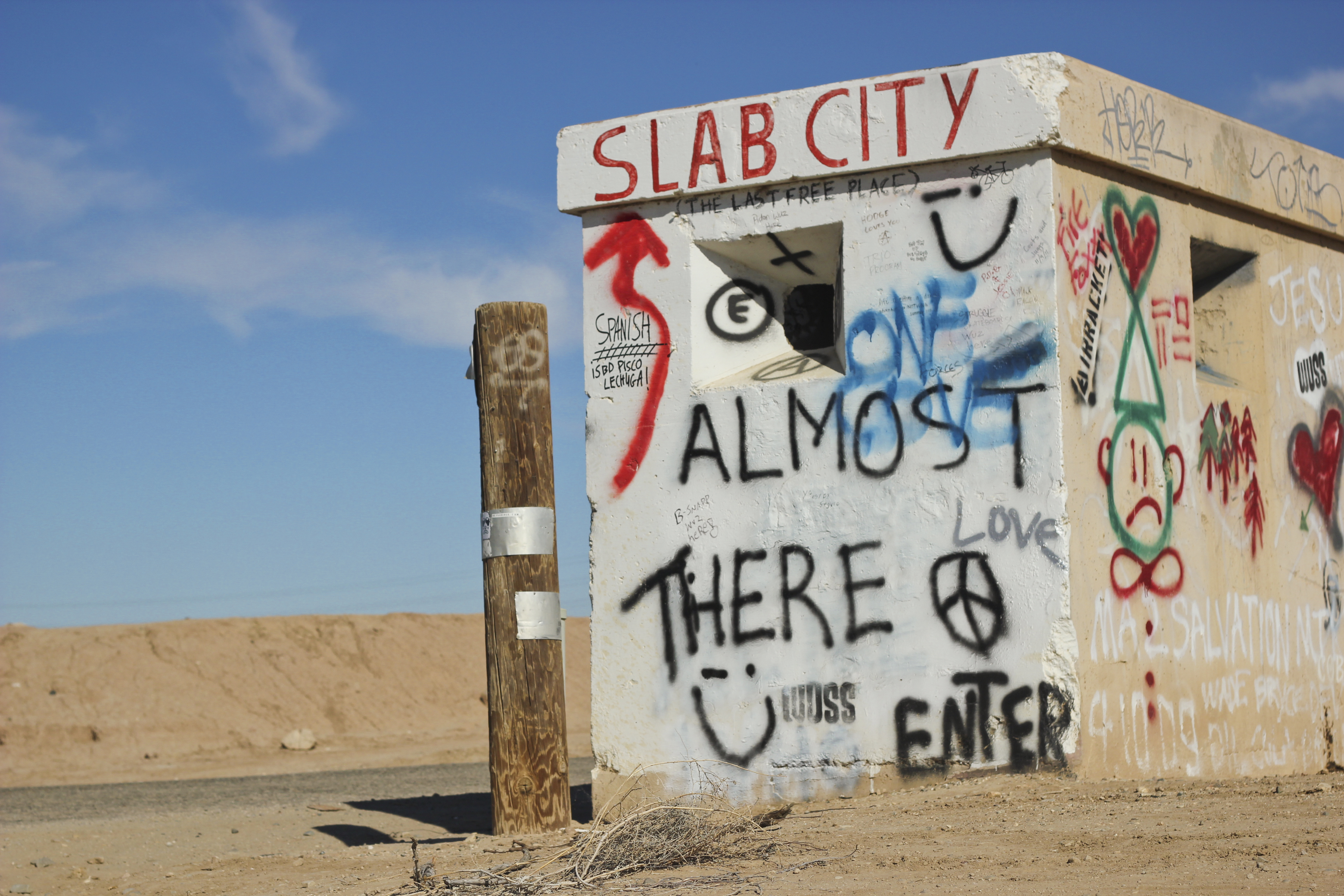
- A former security checkpoint of the abandoned military grounds, now a part of Slab City known as the First Guardshack

Site information
- Owner: United States Navy
- Operator: U.S. Marine Corps
- Controlled by: Fleet Marine Force
- Condition: Abandoned

Location
- Location within California
- Coordinates: 33°15′29.6″N 115°27′53.8″W
- Area: 11,342 acres (4,590 ha)

Site history
- Built: 1942
- Fate: Disbanded in 1961

Camp Dunlap was a United States Marine Corps base in Imperial County, California. The camp was named for Brigadier General Robert H. Dunlap. The 250,000-acre camp was used to train artillery and anti-aircraft units of the Fleet Marine Force. The base was located at the present-day location of Slab City.

Construction of the camp was done by Vinson & Pringle and Del E. Webb Construction Company out of Phoenix, Arizona. The same company contracted to build Marine Corps Air Station El Centro and Marine Corps Air Station Mojave. Camp Dunlap opened on October 15, 1942, to serve as a training facility during World War II. The facility contained five different tent camps within its boundaries and eight different artillery ranges. During the war, the 10th, 11th, and 13th Marine Regiments trained there before departing overseas. The facility was also used as a bombing range for planes flying from nearby Marine Corps Air Station El Centro. The Marine Corps began dismantling the camp in December 1945 and finally closed it in March 1946. The base was turned over to the Naval Real Estate Board at that time. On August 29, 1951, the California State Lands Commission approved the sale of the 11,342 acres (4,590 ha) to the Navy at US$1.20 per acre, with the state retaining the mineral rights, and with the understanding that the land would revert to state ownership once the Navy had abandoned it. In October 1961, the United States Department of Defense conveyed the land on which Camp Dunlap was situated back to the State of California.

== Notes ==
- U.S. Geological Survey Geographic Names Information System: Camp Dunlap
