= Salton Sea =

Shallow saline lake in California, United States

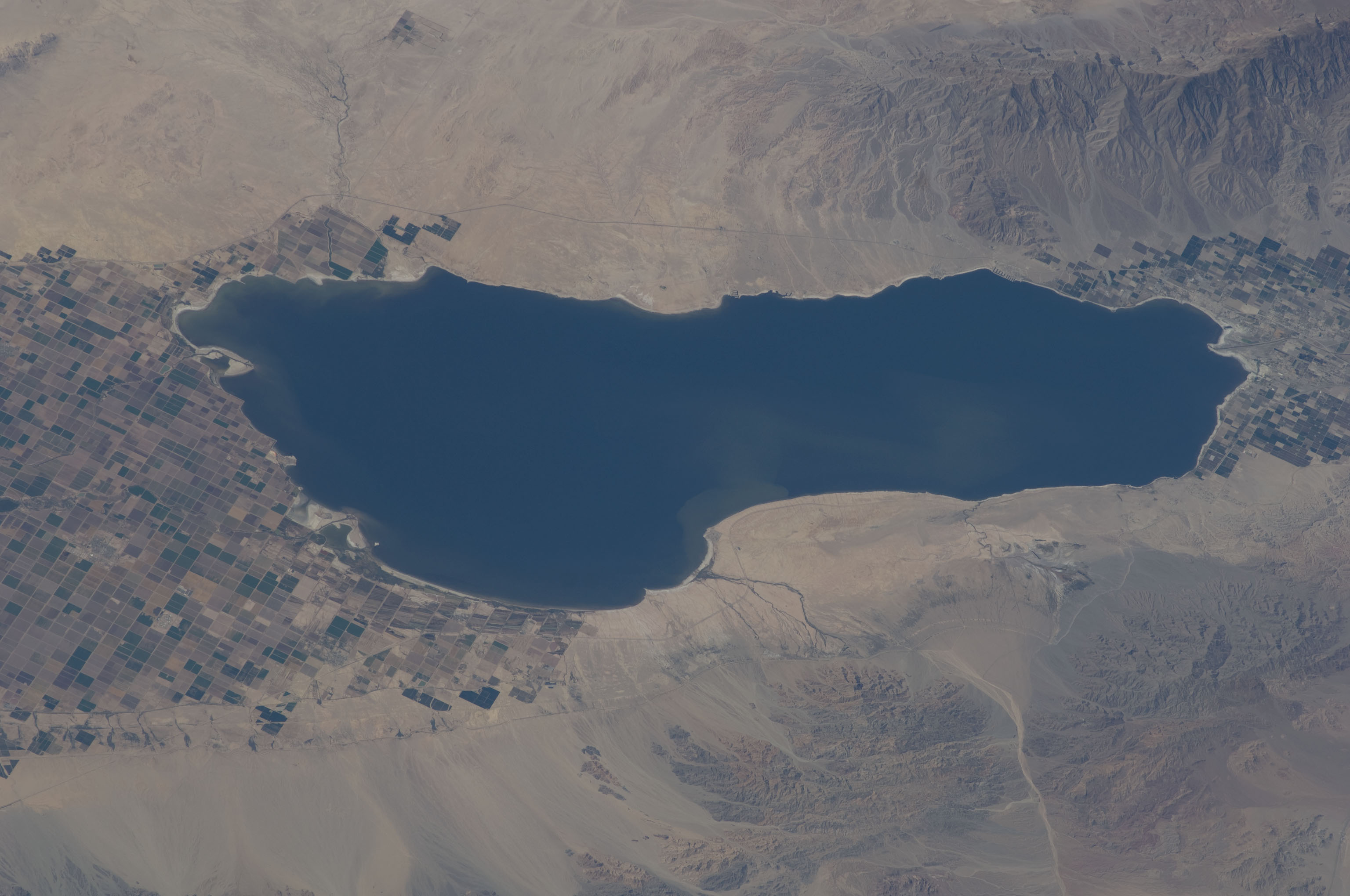

- Location within California Location within the United States
- Location: Colorado Desert; Imperial and Riverside Counties, California, U.S.
- Coordinates: 33°18′47″N 115°50′04″W
- Type: Endorheic rift lake
- Primary inflows: Alamo River; New River; Whitewater River
- Primary outflows: None
- Catchment area: 8,360 sq mi (21,700 km^{2})
- Basin countries: Mexico and United States
- Surface area: 318.0 sq mi (823.6 km^{2})
- Max. depth: 43 ft (13 m)
- Water volume: 6,000,000 acre⋅ft (7.4 km^{3})
- Surface elevation: −236 ft (−71.9 m) (below sea level)
- Settlements: Bombay Beach, Desert Beach, Desert Shores, Salton City, Salton Sea Beach, North Shore
- References: U.S. Geological Survey Geographic Names Information System: Salton Sea

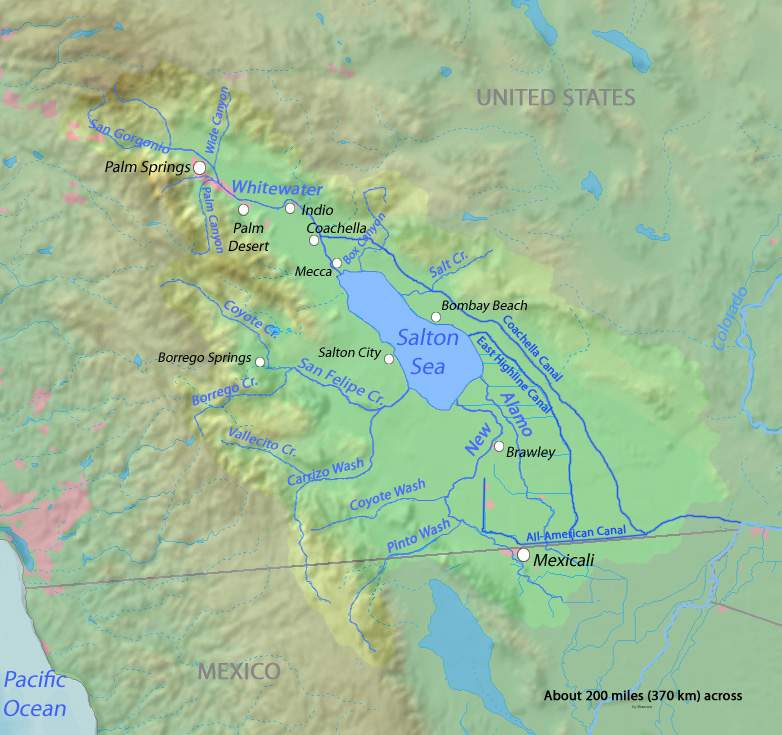
A map of the Salton Sea drainage area

The Salton Sea is a shallow, landlocked, highly saline endorheic lake in Riverside and Imperial counties in Southern California. It lies on the San Andreas Fault within the Salton Trough, which stretches to the Gulf of California in Mexico. The lake is about 15 by 35 miles (24 by 56 km) at its widest and longest. A 2023 report put the surface area at 318 square miles (823.6 km^{2}). The Salton Sea became a resort destination in the 20th century, but saw die-offs of fish and birds in the 1980s due to contamination from farm runoff, and clouds of toxic dust in the 21st century as evaporation exposed parts of the lake bed.

Over millions of years, the Colorado River flowed through or near the Imperial Valley, depositing rich alluvial soil which created fertile farmland and built terrain. As its course changed over time, the river alternately flowed into the valley or diverted around it, creating either a salt lake called Lake Cahuilla or a dry desert basin. When the river diverted around the valley, the lake dried completely, as it did around 1580. Hundreds of archaeological sites have been found in this region, indicating possibly long-term Native American villages and temporary camps.

The modern lake was formed from an inflow of water from the Colorado River in 1905. Beginning in 1900, an irrigation canal was dug from the Colorado River to provide water to the Imperial Valley for farming. Water from spring floods broke through a canal head-gate, diverting a portion of the river flow into the Salton Basin for two years before repairs were completed. The water in the formerly dry lake bed created the modern lake.

The lake would have dried out naturally during the early 20th century, but local farmers used generous amounts of Colorado River water for irrigation and let the excess flow into the lake. In the 1950s and into the 1960s, the area became a resort destination, and communities grew with hotels and vacation homes. Birdwatching was also popular, as the wetlands were a major resting stop on the Pacific Flyway. In the 1970s, scientists issued warnings that the lake would continue to shrink and become more inhospitable to wildlife. In the 1980s, contamination from farm runoff promoted the outbreak and spread of wildlife diseases. Massive die-offs of the avian populations have occurred, especially after the loss of several species of fish on which they depend. Salinity rose so high that large fish kills occurred, often blighting the beaches of the sea with their carcasses. Tourism was drastically reduced.

After 1999, the lake began to shrink as local agriculture used the water more efficiently, so less runoff flowed into the lake. As the lake bed became exposed, winds sent clouds of toxic dust into nearby communities. The state holds primary responsibility for fixing the problems. California lawmakers pledged to fund air-quality management projects in conjunction with the signing of the 2003 agreement to send more water to coastal cities. Local, state and federal bodies all had found minimal success dealing with the dust, dying wildlife, and other problems for which warnings had been issued decades before. In 2017, the Salton Sea Management Program was developed by the state. The Torres Martinez Desert Cahuilla Indians partnered with the state to restore shallow wetlands along the northern edge of the sea in 2018. Construction began in 2021 on the 4,110-acre (1,660 ha) Species Conservation Habitat (SCH) restoration and dust suppression project on the small delta of the New River. In 2025, water began flowing into the first 2,000 acres (810 ha) of the SCH complex of shallow ponds.

== History ==
=== Before the modern era ===
The Gulf of California would extend as far north as the city of Indio, some 150 miles (240 km) northwest of its current limits, were it not for the delta created by the Colorado River. Over three million years, through all of the Pleistocene, the river's delta expanded until it cut off the northern part of the gulf. Since then, the Colorado River has alternated between emptying into the basin, creating a freshwater lake, and emptying into the gulf, leaving the lake to dry and turn to desert. Wave-cut shorelines at various elevations record a repeated cycle of filling and drying over hundreds of thousands of years. The most recent freshwater lake was Lake Cahuilla, also known as the Blake Sea after American professor and geologist William Phipps Blake. It covered over 2,000 square miles (5,200 km^{2}), six times the area of the Salton Sea.

Archaeological sites and radiocarbon dates indicate that the lake was filled three or four times over the last 1,300 years. When full, the lake would attract Native Americans to its shores. Hundreds of sites have been found, some possibly long-term villages and others temporary camps. The occupants ate at least four species of fish (two of which were razorback sucker and bonytail chub), birds (particularly the coot), black-tailed jackrabbit, black-tailed cottontail rabbit, and sometimes deer and bighorn sheep. Among the plants they used were bulrush, cattail, mesquite, and saltbush. The Cahuilla people have an oral memory of the last lake, which existed in the 17th century and dried up soon after 1700.

=== Formation ===
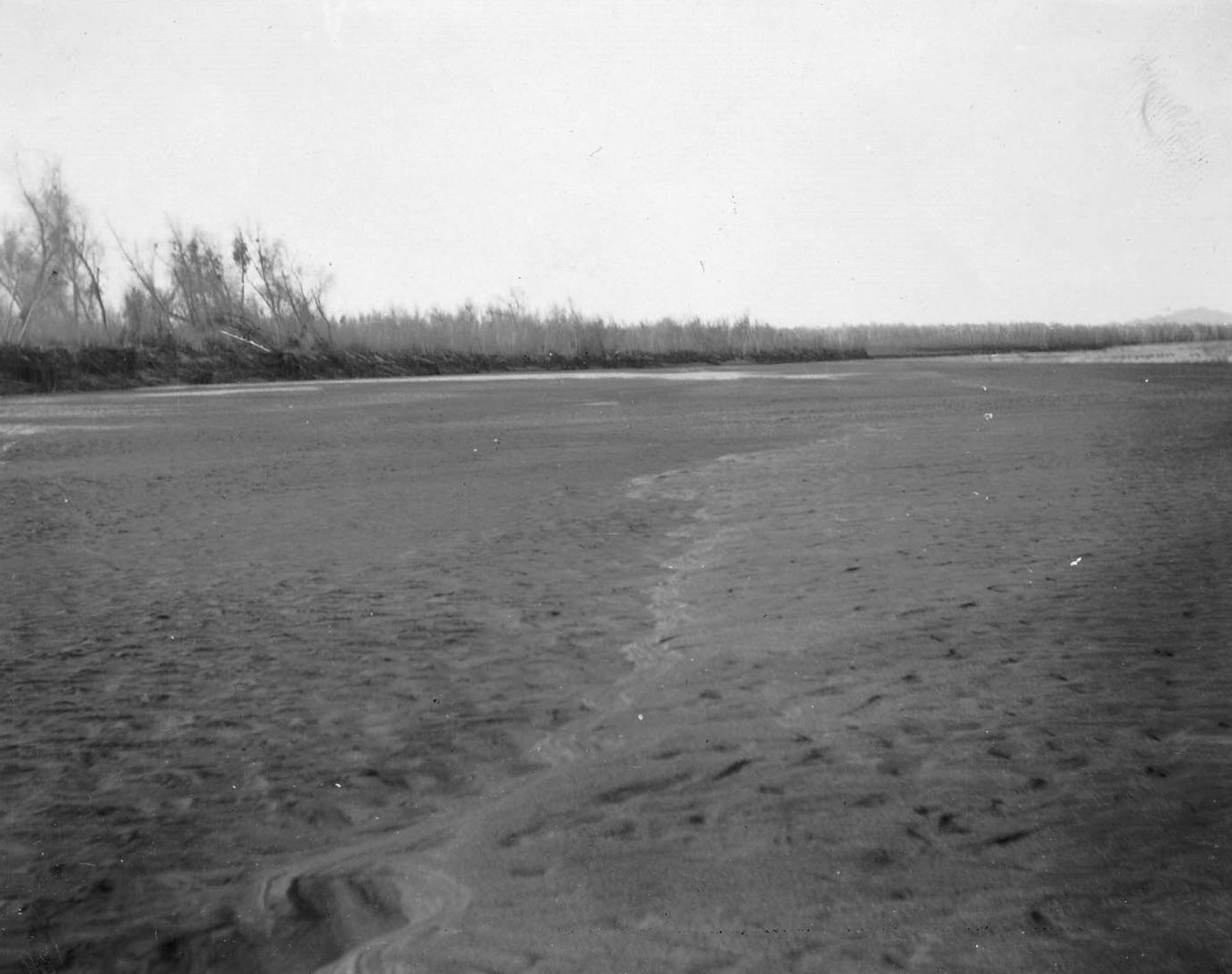
Yuma Project – Dry bed of Colorado River below Imperial Intake, 1906

Throughout the Spanish period of California's history, the area was referred to as the "Colorado Desert" after the Colorado River. In a railroad survey completed in 1855, it was called "the Valley of the Ancient Lake". On several old maps from the Library of Congress, it has been found labeled "Cahuilla Valley" (after the local Indian tribe) and "Cabazon Valley", after a local Indian chief – Chief Cabazon. "Salt Creek" first appeared on a map in 1867, and "Salton Station" is on a railroad map from 1900, although this place had existed as a rail stop since the late 1870s. Until the advent of the modern sea, the Salton Sink was the site of a major salt-mining operation.

In 1900, under Governor James Budd, the California Development Company began construction of irrigation canals to divert water from the Colorado River into the Salton Sink, a dry lake bed. After construction of these irrigation canals, the Salton Sink became fertile, allowing farmers to plant crops.

Within two years, the Alamo Canal became filled with silt from the Colorado River. Engineers tried to alleviate the blockages to no avail. Imperial Valley farmers, under considerable financial stress, pressured the California Development Company to resolve the problem. Engineer Charles Rockwood, faced with bankruptcy and "after mature deliberation", directed the construction of a breach in the bank of the Colorado River approximately 4 miles (6.4 km) south of the existing wooden headgates (the Chaffey Gate).

The breach, known as the Lower Mexican Intake and constructed without headgates and without the permission of the Mexican authorities, allowed the Colorado River to flow unimpeded into the canal and then to Imperial Valley farms. Rockwood's action in ordering the breach was later described as a "blunder so serious as to be practically criminal."

In 1905, heavy rainfall and snowmelt caused the Colorado River to swell, overrunning the third intake cut into the bank of the river and sending the flood into the Alamo Canal. The resulting flood poured down the canal and down two formerly dry arroyos, the New River in the west and the Alamo River in the east, each about 60 mi (97 km) long. Over about two years, these two newly created rivers carried the entire volume of the Colorado River into the Salton Sink.

The Southern Pacific Railroad tried to stop the flooding by dumping earth into the canal's headgates area, but the effort was not fast enough, and the river eroded deeper and deeper into the dry desert sand of the Imperial Valley. A large waterfall formed as a result and began cutting rapidly upstream along the path of the Alamo Canal that now was occupied by the Colorado. This waterfall was initially 15 feet (4.6 m) high but grew to 80 feet (20 m) high before the flow through the breach was stopped. Originally, the waterfall was feared to recede upstream to the true main path of the Colorado, becoming up to 100 to 300 feet (30 to 90 m) high, when it would be practically impossible to stop the flow.

As the basin filled, the town of Salton, a Southern Pacific Railroad siding, the New Liverpool Salt Company facility and miniature railroad, and Torres Martinez Desert Cahuilla Indian Reservation were submerged. Established in 1876, nearly half of the reservation was eventually flooded as the Cahuillas packed their belongings and headed into the mountains. The influx of water and the lack of any drainage from the basin resulted in the formation of the Salton Sea. On February 11, 1907, the breach was finally closed after substantial intervention by the Southern Pacific.

=== Agriculture, tourism and wildlife proliferate ===
In the 1920s, agriculture had boomed in the valley as the Imperial Irrigation District delivered large quantities of Colorado River water to irrigate the crops. The lake would have dried up naturally, but with flood irrigation being commonly used, plenty of water ran off the farms into the lake and kept it full. The district holds senior rights to water from the Colorado River according to Doctrine of Prior Appropriation, which states that whoever first puts a quantity of water from a given source to beneficial use gains the right to use that quantity of water from that source in future.

In 1930, a wildlife refuge was established on some wetlands along the edge of the lake that had attracted many birds. The fish flourished in the lake and provided a source of food for massive populations of migratory birds. Birdwatchers flocked to this new refuge in the middle of a desert.

The continuing intermittent flooding of the Imperial Valley from the Colorado River ended with the construction of Hoover Dam. Imperial Dam, built in 1938, serves as a desilting dam for water entering the irrigation canals.

In the 1950s and into the 1960s, the communities expanded as the area's reputation as a resort destination and sport fishery grew. Hotels and yacht clubs were built on the shore along with homes and schools. Resorts in communities like Bombay Beach hosted entertainers such as Frank Sinatra, The Beach Boys and Bing Crosby. Yacht clubs held parties at night and golf courses provided recreation. Many people came for boating activities such as water skiing and fishing as stocked fish proliferated. Lakeshore communities grew as vacation homes were built. More than 1.5 million visitors visited annually at the peak.

=== Catastrophic decline ===
In the 1970s, scientists issued warnings about the changes coming to this lake with no outlet. Studies that started in the 1960s found a complex problem for which any remediation would be expensive. The Imperial Valley has about 500,000 acres (200,000 ha) of farmland for which flood irrigation is typical. Water from the Colorado River is diverted near Yuma, Arizona, into the 82-mile (132 km) All-American Canal. The canal runs west along the Mexican border and then north into 1,700 miles (2,700 km) of irrigation channels that crisscross the farms.

Gravity carries the agricultural runoff downhill through the New and Alamo rivers to the lake. The water is full of salts, selenium, and fertilizers (mainly nitrates). As it drains through the soil, the water leaches out ancient salt deposits that also raise the salinity. Evaporation in the desert heat further concentrates the salt. The transformation of the lake made it increasingly inhospitable to wildlife. By the late 1970s, fish started dying off and bird populations declined.

In the late 1970s, a series of heavy tropical storms caused the water level to rapidly rise and flood its banks. The surrounding towns and businesses were severely damaged, many beyond repair. In 1976, Hurricane Kathleen inundated the lakeshore communities and put Bombay Beach completely underwater. Tourism was drastically reduced, and many of the resorts and associated infrastructure were abandoned. The state began to issue odor advisories as the lake began to stink.

In the 1990s, the shores were littered with dead fish as the lake had gotten so salty that large die-offs occurred. Fertilizers in the runoff caused massive blooms of algae. When storms churned the lake, botulism spread among the dying tilapia, which were eaten by the birds. During a four-month long period in 1996, 14,000 birds died from avian botulism, nearly 10,000 of which were American White Pelicans. The carcasses were burned in an incinerator 24 hours per day for weeks. The resulting news coverage conveyed a simplified story that implied the lake was a toxic catastrophe filled with water that could be deadly.

In 1995, Congressman Sonny Bono advocated for attention to the problems. His wife, Mary Bono Oswald, and some politicians took up the cause as a form of tribute to Bono after his death in a 1998 skiing accident. Congress passed and President Bill Clinton signed into law the Salton Sea Reclamation Act of 1998 (Public Law 105-372). In 1999, the lake began to recede dramatically. The dropping water level stranded many of the remaining boat docks, residences, and businesses. Water-management priorities were changing including diverting water from agricultural areas to cities.

The U.S. Department of the Interior prepared a draft Environmental Impact Report in compliance with the Reclamation Act and working in partnership with the Salton Sea Authority. A Strategic Science Plan and the Bureau of Reclamation's Alternatives Appraisal Report were also added to the voluminous studies of the lake. Before the legislative and scientific recommendations were implemented, priorities shifted away from activities at the lake after the September 11 attacks in 2001.

In 2003, the Imperial Irrigation District signed the largest agriculture-to-urban water transfer agreement in US history. Much of its water allocation would go to communities along the California coast at a profit. With a 45-year term, the Quantification Settlement Agreement was a means for the San Diego County Water Authority and other districts to obtain additional water for the growing communities they serve. Local agriculture became more efficient at using water which resulted in the shoreline retreating as less run-off flowed into the lake. Farmers installed sprinklers to replace flood irrigation and used soil measurement devices that tell them when to water.

As the Salton Sea shrank, it became saltier than ocean water. The California State Legislature, by legislation enacted in 2003 and 2004, directed the secretary of the California Resources Agency to prepare a restoration plan for the Salton Sea ecosystem, and an Environmental Impact Report. The Salton Sea Authority had a consultant study the alternatives and in 2004 issued their preferred alternative. After receiving comments from other agencies, they approved a new report in 2006. They hoped the reports would influence the state as it prepared the proposal mandated by the legislature.

The state released an $8.9-billion proposal in 2007 that involved building a horseshoe-shaped outer lake, a berm crossing the center of the lake and an extensive system of dikes, channels and pumps. Due to their concerns about the impact on the lake, the district only approved the water transfer agreement after Governor Gray Davis had signed the 2003 legislation known as the Salton Sea Restoration Act. It stated that it was the "intent of the Legislature that the State of California undertake the restoration of the Salton Sea ecosystem and the permanent protection of the wildlife dependent on that ecosystem". The restoration plan was not implemented as state lawmakers found it too expensive and the Great Recession hit the economy. Repeated delays and dwindling public interest precluded any real change.

=== Exposed lakebed impacts air quality ===
The lake continued to dry up, exposing more lake bed known as playa, and sending nearby communities clouds of toxic dust. A haze incorporating pesticide plumes, exhaust fumes, factory emissions, and the vaporized dust from the lake regularly hangs over the communities in the valley. With a dense blend of ozone and particulate matter, Imperial County became known for some of the worst air quality in the country. Eastern Coachella communities have disproportionately higher rates of asthma and respiratory complications because of high concentrations of contaminants in the air.

Over 20% of the children in the region have asthma, with the national rate being less than 10%. Scientists are studying how much of this is caused by the Salton Sea dust and what is actually in the windblown particles. Ten schools in the Imperial Valley use green, yellow, and red flags signaling air quality for the many children who have asthma. Green means they join their friends on the playground, whereas red means they stay inside all day. Parents can also receive emailed alerts from the Imperial County Air Pollution Control District. Local activists ask if this is an issue of environmental justice, since the area most impacted is 85% Latinos. Some 650,000 people, many who are farmworkers, live where there is significant exposure to the dust.

The public health impacts of continuing not to meet federal air quality standards include the treatment of child and adult asthma, cardiac disease, lung cancer, and increased mortality rates. Lower concentrations of the wind-borne dust travel all the way into Southern California and Arizona. Residents in the Los Angeles Basin, some 150 miles (240 km) away, complained about the odor that drifted their way in 2012, after the biomass on the sea bottom was churned by a storm.

During the first 15 years after the sale of the Imperial water to San Diego County, the Imperial Irrigation District has been required to put water into the Salton Sea to compensate for the loss of agricultural runoff needed to replenish the sea. As the 2017 deadline for ending the additional mitigation water approached, the district, along with Imperial County, petitioned the California State Water Resources Control Board in 2014 with a demand for state action to fulfill its obligation after years of delays and unfulfilled plans. Pacific Institute, an environmental think tank, was warning that the lack of replenishment water was leading to a "period of very rapid deterioration." The rapidly shrinking sea was a "looming environmental and public health crisis". With the increased shrinkage, dust storms would increase and the rotten-egg smell would reach the coastal cities more frequently.

About 36,000 acres (15,000 ha), or about 10%, of Imperial Valley's arable farmland was temporarily fallowed to meet the reductions in the water transfer agreement. Since the most recent creation of the lake, local farms in the Imperial Valley have produced alfalfa, wheat, and vegetables such as carrots and Brussels sprouts. As of 2015, the most widely planted crop was alfalfa, followed by Bermuda grass and Sudan grass. A third of the hay produced here was exported to China, the United Arab Emirates, Saudi Arabia, and Japan. Most of exported hay feeds dairy cows, while Japan uses it for Kobe beef production.

On January 1, 2018, 40% less water began flowing into the sea, as the 15-year mitigation period ended per the 2003 water transfer agreement. A court decision also forced the Imperial Irrigation District to end a program that had allowed it to equally distribute and cap the amount of water its members receive. Although it had been shrinking for years, this began to lower the water level significantly. As the shore recedes, at least 75 square miles (190 km^{2}) of playa will be exposed by 2045, with additional dust becoming wind blown as the exposed playa dries out.

A vertical drop of one foot in the water level can expose thousands of feet of horizontal playa. The state is mainly responsible, as California lawmakers pledged to fund air-quality management projects to mitigate impacts from the 2003 water transfer agreement. Over the years, local, state and federal bodies have found minimal success dealing with the dust from the exposed playa. To reduce wind-borne dust, the district has a program known as vegetation enhancement and surface roughening, which includes plowing furrows on newly exposed playa within property owned by the district.

Fugitive dust, consisting of very small particles suspended in the air, is being studied to distinguish between playa dust and desert emissions that are primarily made up of mineral dust from soil. The Imperial County Air Quality Management District, the South Coast Air Quality Management District, and the University of California at Riverside School of Medicine along with the environmental justice group Comite Civico Del Valle are using mobile and stationary air quality monitoring units in the effort to protect the health of the nearby residents.

In 2022, a massive haboob arose during a nighttime storm with a 3,000-foot-high wall of dust (910 m) and 60 miles per hour (97 km/h) winds that impacted communities as far as Los Angeles.

== Management programs ==
In 2015, the Salton Sea Task Force was formed by the state by Governor Jerry Brown's administration. In March 2017, the California Natural Resources Agency released the Salton Sea Management Program (SSMP). The SSMP proposed constructing 29,800 acres (12,100 ha) of habitat restoration and dust suppression projects on lakebed areas that have been, or will be, exposed at the Salton Sea by 2028. This would improve conditions for residents and wildlife. The initial 10-year plan would cover less than half of the dry lakebed that researchers say will be exposed during that time.

The state initially budgeted $80.5 million to begin designing the wetlands without a commitment that the program will ever be fully funded. The projected cost to design and construct the improvements is $383 million. The focus was no longer on restoring the lake, but about presenting a feasible plan with a budget that legislators would gradually fund over the ten-year period. The 10-year plan will not fix everything, so state and local officials continue to seek ways to deal with the problems. Salton Sea Management Program Monitoring and Adaptive Management Implementation Plan was developed to prioritize and phase-in implementation of the 2013 USGS Salton Sea Ecosystem Monitoring and Assessment Plan.

The first state-funded project was the Torres-Martinez Wetland Project, in which the Torres Martinez Desert Cahuilla Indians partnered with the state to restore shallow wetlands along the northern edge of the sea that was destroyed by a massive storm in 2012. This prototype project was completed in April 2018.

In November 2019, an emergency was declared because of the "heavily polluted New River, which empties into the Salton Sea". The Imperial County Board of Supervisors were hoping that this would accelerate the restoration projects by enabling the state to obtain federal funding. Nearly all the state's funding comes from bond measures for the Salton Sea projects. Since 2000, California voters had approved five bond measures as of 2020.

In February 2020, the California Natural Resources Agency finished the "Bruchard Road Dust Suppression Project" which, although only 112 acres (45 ha), was the first dust suppression project to be completed under the Salton Sea Management Program: Phase 1: 10 Year Plan (August 2018).

In January 2021, construction began on the 4,110-acre (1,660 ha) Species Conservation Habitat (SCH) Project on the small delta of the New River. The project built ponds and wetlands on both sides of the mouth of this highly polluted river on the southern bank of the sea. Water from the Salton Sea is combined with the river water to control salinity and naturally occurring selenium. While creating a dust reducing wetlands, the blended water achieves the proper conditions for the desert pupfish and other aquatic life. In November 2022, the Federal government said it will spend $250 million over four years for the project.

In October 2024, expanding the SCH project by 750 acres (300 ha) was announced with the allocation of $70 million in federal funding for improving drought infrastructure. In 2025, water began flowing into first 2,000 acres (810 ha) of the SCH complex of shallow ponds.

=== Water importation review ===
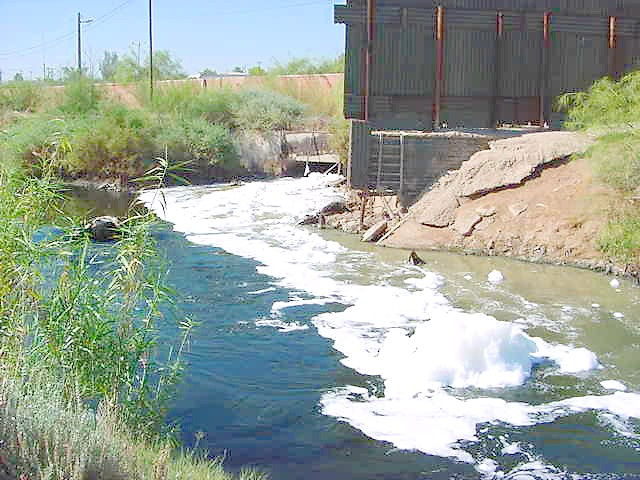
The New River passes from Mexicali, Baja California, to the Imperial Valley, and on to the Salton Sea.

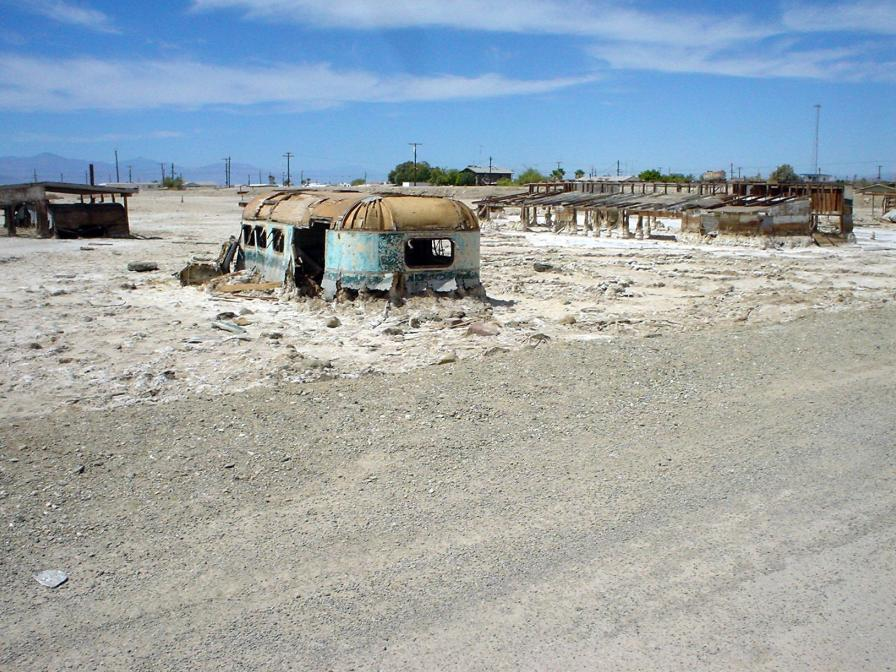
Abandoned, salt-encrusted structures on the Salton Sea shore at Bombay Beach

Many concepts have been proposed on how to deal with the problems. The idea of importing seawater from the Pacific Ocean or the Sea of Cortez in Mexico has been around for a long time. The area's plentiful geothermal power could be used to desalinate the water. Around 2004, Aqua Genesis Ltd proposed such a project that would sell the fresh water. Their proposal involved the construction of over 20 miles (32 km) of pipes and tunneling that would have provided 1,000,000 acre-feet (1.2 km^{3}) of water to Southern California coastal cities each year. Berkshire Hathaway Energy has a subsidiary that already operates 10 geothermal plants in the area, and as of 2020 was developing a seawater desalination proposal.

In 2018, the California Natural Resources Agency requested proposals to increase waterflow to the sea to reduce dust and dust-borne toxins. The 11 proposals ranged in cost from $300 million to several billion dollars. Alternatively, a 2020 research report stated that the cost of "transferring water from agricultural users to the Salton Sea" would be lower and achievable using existing infrastructure.

The aqueduct proposal, and others, hung on the outcome of a feasibility study. After a yearlong review, in 2022 a state-appointed panel of experts rejected the idea "based on its high cost, environmental damage, minimal benefits to Mexico" and other factors, recommending instead that fresh water be diverted to the sea. However, the Colorado River "is facing an unprecedented water crisis due to prolonged drought, climate change and an overallocation of its resources".

== Ecology ==
=== Salinity ===
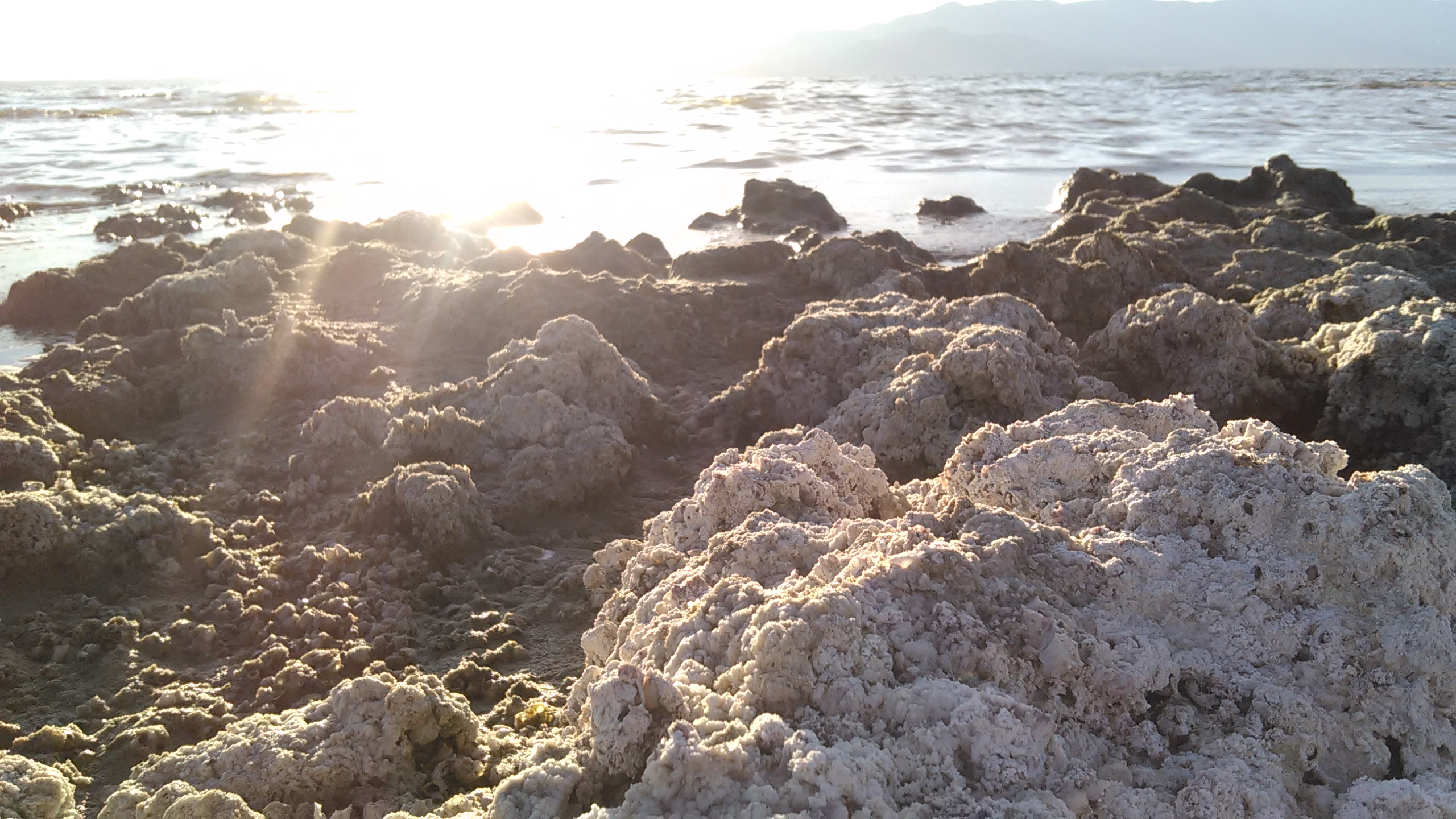
Salt deposits along the eastern shore of the Salton Sea

In 2019, the water of the Salton Sea had a salinity of about 70 grams per liter. The 2025 annual report from the Salton Sea Management Program stated that salinity "ranged from 68,000 milligrams/liter (mg/L) to 86,000 mg/L" in measurements from November 2024. This is double the salinity of the Pacific Ocean (35 g/L). The lack of an outflow means the Salton Sea does not have a natural stabilization system; it is very dynamic. Fluctuations in the water level caused by variations in agricultural runoff, the ancient salt deposits in the lake bed, and the relatively high salinity of the inflow feeding the sea, are all causing increasing salinity.

The salinity concentration has been increasing at a rate of about 3% per year. About 3.6 million tonnes of salt are deposited in the valley each year. An undated report on the University of California: Imperial County website provides these specifics: "The amount of salts that is deposited in the Imperial Valley agricultural land with irrigation water is about 4 million tons of salts annually. To maintain crop productivities, equal amount of salts must be leached from the root zone".

Fertilizer runoffs have resulted in eutrophication, with large algal blooms and elevated bacterial levels. By the 1970s, the runoff which was full of salty chemicals led to a warning that the salinity of the lake would no longer sustain wildlife. Both the hypersalinity and the presence of contaminants in the Salton Sea triggered massive die-offs in the fish and avian populations; salt water carries less oxygen than fresh water, which was further depleted by algal blooms and by extreme temperatures during the summer.

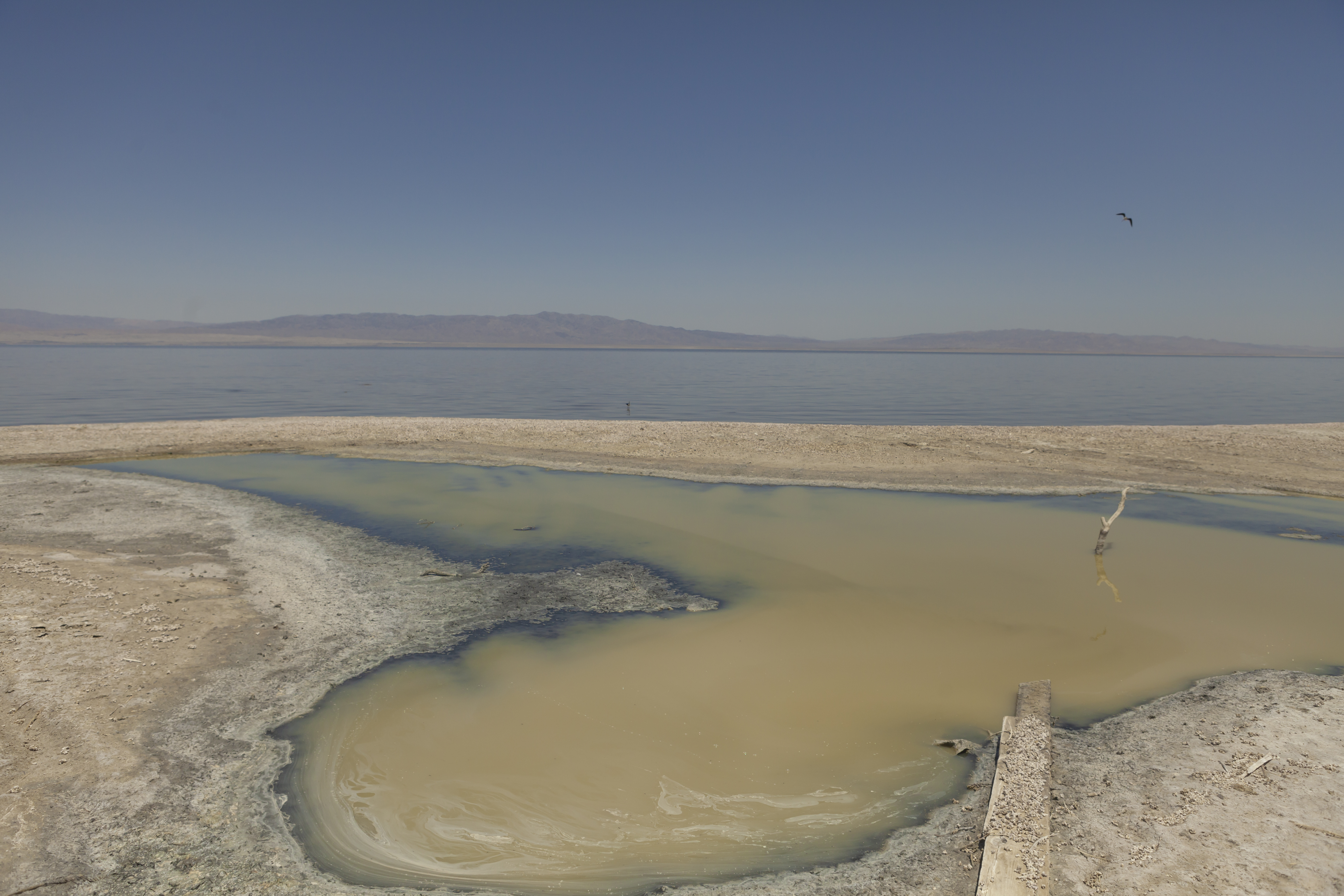
Toxic salt ponds along the western shoreline

=== Fish population ===
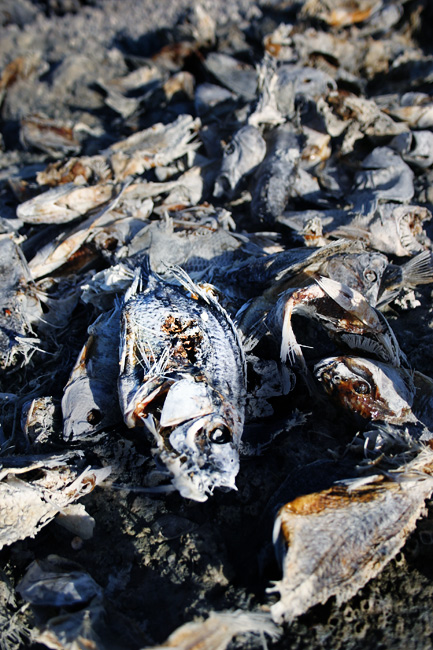
Dead fish on the western shore of Salton City

The desert pupfish is the sea's only native fish species and is a federally listed endangered species. Notable for its ability to withstand the sea's rising salinity, it can survive salinities ranging from freshwater to twice as salty as seawater. The pupfish have adapted to the Imperial Irrigation District's drains, which funnel water runoff from farms into the Salton Sea.

The body was initially a freshwater lake and was stocked with tilapia, gulf croaker, orangemouth corvina, and sargo, which sustained an important sport fishery and provided food for birds. By the 1960s, rising salinity had begun to jeopardize some of these species. A September 2019 report stated that 20 years earlier, "there were some 100 million fish in the Sea. Now, more than 97% of those fish are gone". It is now too saline for most species of fish. Massive fish kills involve the oxygen-depleting combination of summer sun and salt. The fish suffocate as salt water carries less oxygen than fresh water. Dead fish wash up in mass quantities on the beaches.

Introduced tilapia (hybrid Mozambique × Wami) can tolerate the high salinity levels and pollution. As of 2014, other fresh and brackish water fish species lived in the rivers and canals that fed the Salton Sea, including redbelly tilapia, threadfin shad, carp, red shiner, channel catfish, white catfish, largemouth bass, mosquitofish, and sailfin molly.

Tilapia populations have reached such low volumes such that the fish-eating birds in the area cannot be sustained anymore. Scientists have estimated that a salinity of 70 parts per thousand would be fatal to all of the lake's fish species. Declining tilapia populations have seen an immense proliferation of their prey, water boatmen, which are also eaten by shorebirds and other fish. A direct concern of the potential eradication of fish species from the sea includes mosquito production, which is usually abundant in high salinity salt marshes but has been low because of the presence of fish. There have been worries about this potential outcome as mosquitoes in warm regions have been known to "act as vectors of West Nile virus, Western equine encephalitis and St. Louis encephalitis".

The California Office of Environmental Health Hazard Assessment developed a safe eating advisory for fish caught in the Salton Sea based on levels of mercury or PCBs found in local species. As of 2018, all species were considered acceptable for all populations.

=== Avian population ===
The Salton Sea has been termed a "crown jewel of avian biodiversity" by Milt Friend of the Salton Sea Science Office. It hosts "the most diverse and probably most significant populations of bird life in the continental United States, rivaled only by Big Bend, Texas;" over 400 species have been documented. The Salton Sea is also a major resting stop on the Pacific Flyway. A December 2018 report by the National Geographic Society stated: "Nearly all of California's population of eared grebes, for example, stop over at the lake, and at least a third of all the white pelicans living in North America ..." The report expressed concern about the reducing input of water into the Sea and the increasing salinity. "Without that extra water, the lake's shrinking will start to accelerate—making it saltier, smaller, less welcoming to the birds that rely on it during migration".

Both the hypersalinity and presence of contaminants in the Salton Sea triggered massive die-offs in the fish and avian populations and the contamination promoted the outbreak and spread of diseases such as avian cholera. In turn, the loss of several species of fish that the avian population depended on for food increased their risk of starvation, exacerbating their decline. Birdwatchers in 2017 reported that most of the American white pelicans, double-crested cormorants, and eared grebes have disappeared.

The Salton Sea is notable as the only part of the United States to host a significant population of Yellow-footed gulls, a species otherwise endemic to the Gulf of California. Most of these gulls are only present in the summer months.

=== Vegetation ===
According to the A. W. Kuchler U.S. potential natural vegetation types, the area roughly within 3 miles (4.8 km) of the sandy shoreline of the Salton Sea would have a saltbush/greasewood (40) vegetation type and a Great Basin shrubland (7) vegetation form.

== Geography ==
This saline, endorheic rift lake on the San Andreas Fault at the southern end of the U.S. state of California lies between and within the Imperial and Coachella valleys, all of which lie within the larger Salton Trough, a pull-apart basin that stretches to the Gulf of California in Mexico. The lake occupies the lowest elevations of the trough, known as the Salton Sink, where the lake surface is 236.0 ft (71.9 m) below sea level as of January 2018. The deepest point of the lake is only 5 ft (1.5 m) higher than the lowest point of Death Valley.

The Salton Sea is about 15 by 35 miles (24 by 56 km) at its widest and longest, though it varies in dimensions and area with fluctuations in agricultural runoff and rainfall. A 2023 report puts surface area at 318 square miles. The New, Whitewater, and Alamo rivers, combined with agricultural runoff, are the primary sources that feed the lake. The Salton Sea is the largest lake in California by surface area. The average annual inflow is less than 1.2 million acre⋅ft (1.5 km^{3}), which is enough to maintain a maximum depth of 43 feet (13 m) and a total volume of about 6 million acre⋅ft (7.4 km^{3}). Due to changes in water apportionments agreed upon for the Colorado River under the Quantification Settlement Agreement of 2003, the surface area of the sea had been expected to decrease by 60% between 2013 and 2021.

=== Ownership ===
The land under the lake is a patchwork of ownership spread across three primary entities: the federal government (mostly the Bureau of Reclamation and the Bureau of Land Management), the Imperial Irrigation District, and the Torres Martinez Desert Cahuilla Indians.

=== Climate ===
According to the Köppen climate classification system, the Salton Sea has a hot desert climate (BWh). According to the United States Department of Agriculture, the Plant Hardiness zone is 9b with an average annual extreme minimum temperature of 28.5 °F (−1.9 °C). The temperature of the surface water changes with the seasonally varying air temperature. Winter surface water can reach temperatures as low as 50 °F (10 °C) and summer surface water highs can reach 95 °F (35 °C).

Climate data for Salton Sea, Imperial County, CA
Month	Jan	Feb	Mar	Apr	May	Jun	Jul	Aug	Sep	Oct	Nov	Dec	Year
Mean daily maximum °F (°C)	70.9 (21.6)	74.5 (23.6)	80.3 (26.8)	86.8 (30.4)	95.0 (35.0)	102.9 (39.4)	107.2 (41.8)	106.6 (41.4)	102.0 (38.9)	91.5 (33.1)	79.0 (26.1)	69.8 (21.0)	88.9 (31.6)
Mean daily minimum °F (°C)	41.7 (5.4)	45.0 (7.2)	50.1 (10.1)	55.3 (12.9)	62.4 (16.9)	69.2 (20.7)	76.7 (24.8)	77.7 (25.4)	71.3 (21.8)	59.9 (15.5)	48.5 (9.2)	40.9 (4.9)	58.3 (14.6)
Average precipitation inches (mm)	0.38 (9.7)	0.43 (11)	0.40 (10)	0.06 (1.5)	0.02 (0.51)	0.02 (0.51)	0.09 (2.3)	0.22 (5.6)	0.20 (5.1)	0.21 (5.3)	0.15 (3.8)	0.38 (9.7)	2.56 (65)
Average relative humidity (%)	39.6	37.8	33.7	28.6	27.3	24.5	29.6	32.2	30.6	30.7	34.6	38.9	32.3
Average dew point °F (°C)	32.0 (0.0)	33.9 (1.1)	35.9 (2.2)	36.9 (2.7)	42.2 (5.7)	45.6 (7.6)	55.8 (13.2)	58.3 (14.6)	52.1 (11.2)	42.7 (5.9)	35.3 (1.8)	30.8 (−0.7)	41.8 (5.4)
Source: PRISM Climate Group

== Geology ==
=== Earthquakes and tectonic setting ===
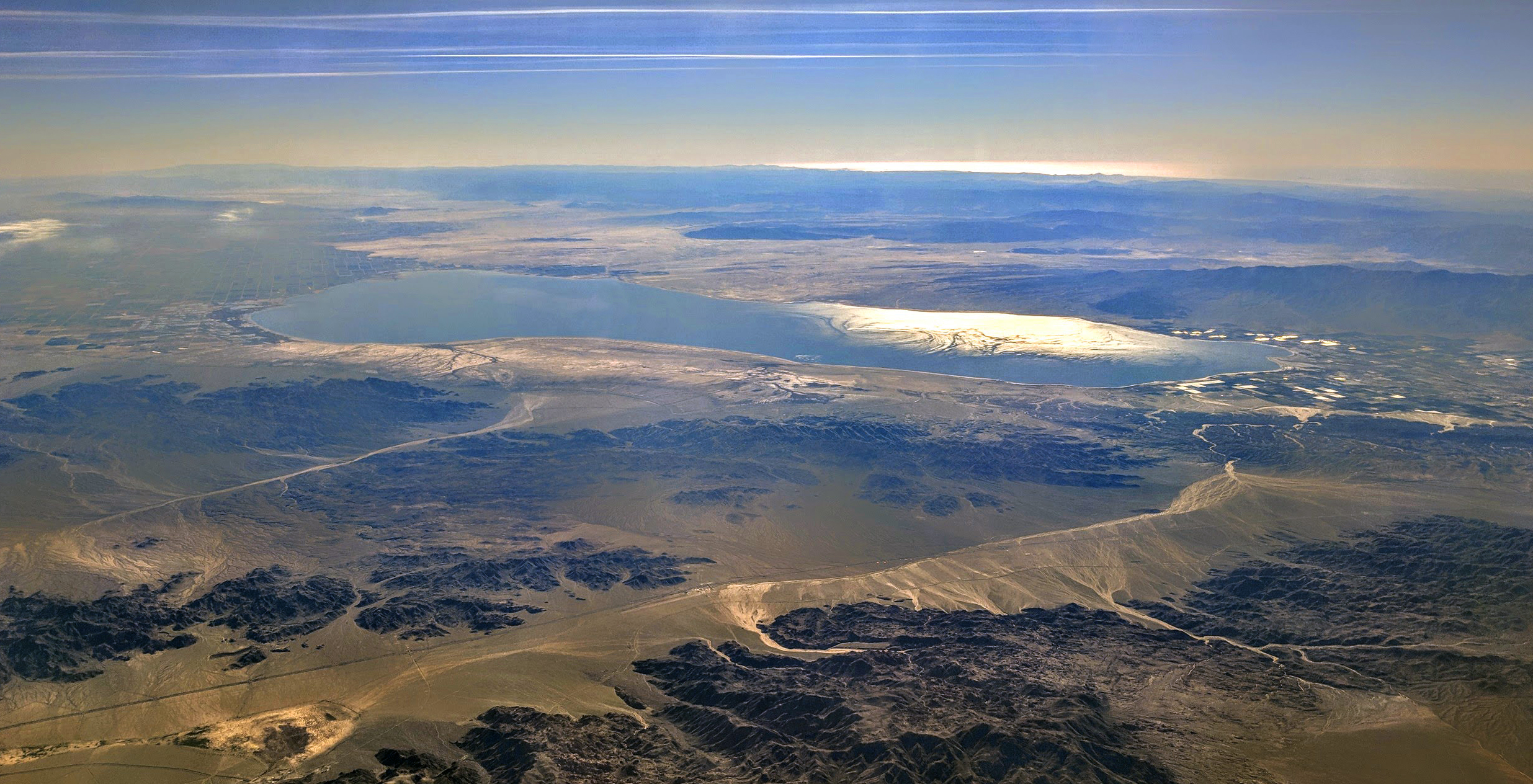
An aerial view of the Salton Sea from the north

The Salton Sea and surrounding basin sits over the San Andreas Fault, San Jacinto Fault, Imperial Fault Zone, and a "stepover fault" shear zone system. Geologists have determined that previous flooding episodes from the Colorado River have been linked to earthquakes along the San Andreas Fault. Sonar and other instruments were used to map the Salton Sea's underwater faults during the study. During the period when the basin was filled by Lake Cahuilla, a much larger inland sea, earthquakes higher than magnitude 7 occurred roughly every 180 years, the last one occurring within decades of 1700.

Computer models suggest the normal faults in the area are most vulnerable to deviatoric stress loading by filling in of water. Currently, a risk still exists for an earthquake of magnitude 7 to 8. Simulations also showed, in the Los Angeles area, shaking and thus damage would be more severe for a San Andreas earthquake that propagated along the fault from the south, rather than from the north. Such an earthquake also raises the risk for soil liquefaction in the Imperial Valley region.

The effective drainage divide that separates the Salton Sea from the Gulf of California is about 30 feet (9 m) in elevation and is located near Delta, northeastern Baja California State, Mexico, south-southeast of Mexicali. Past sea level rise may partially be responsible for the salinity of the lake, while potential future changes in sea levels could occur. Other factors such as hydrothermal vents, diffusion of salt from minerals and sediment, including concentrated brine, and evaporites are another contributor to salinity, as is the recent lowering of lake levels raising the salinity. Sedimentary records show the lake surface elevation reached levels 33 to 39 feet (10 to 12 m) above world sea level in the 1500s.

=== Satellite calibration ===
The Salton Sea is used to calibrate sensors on imaging satellites such as Landsat.

=== Heat and minerals ===
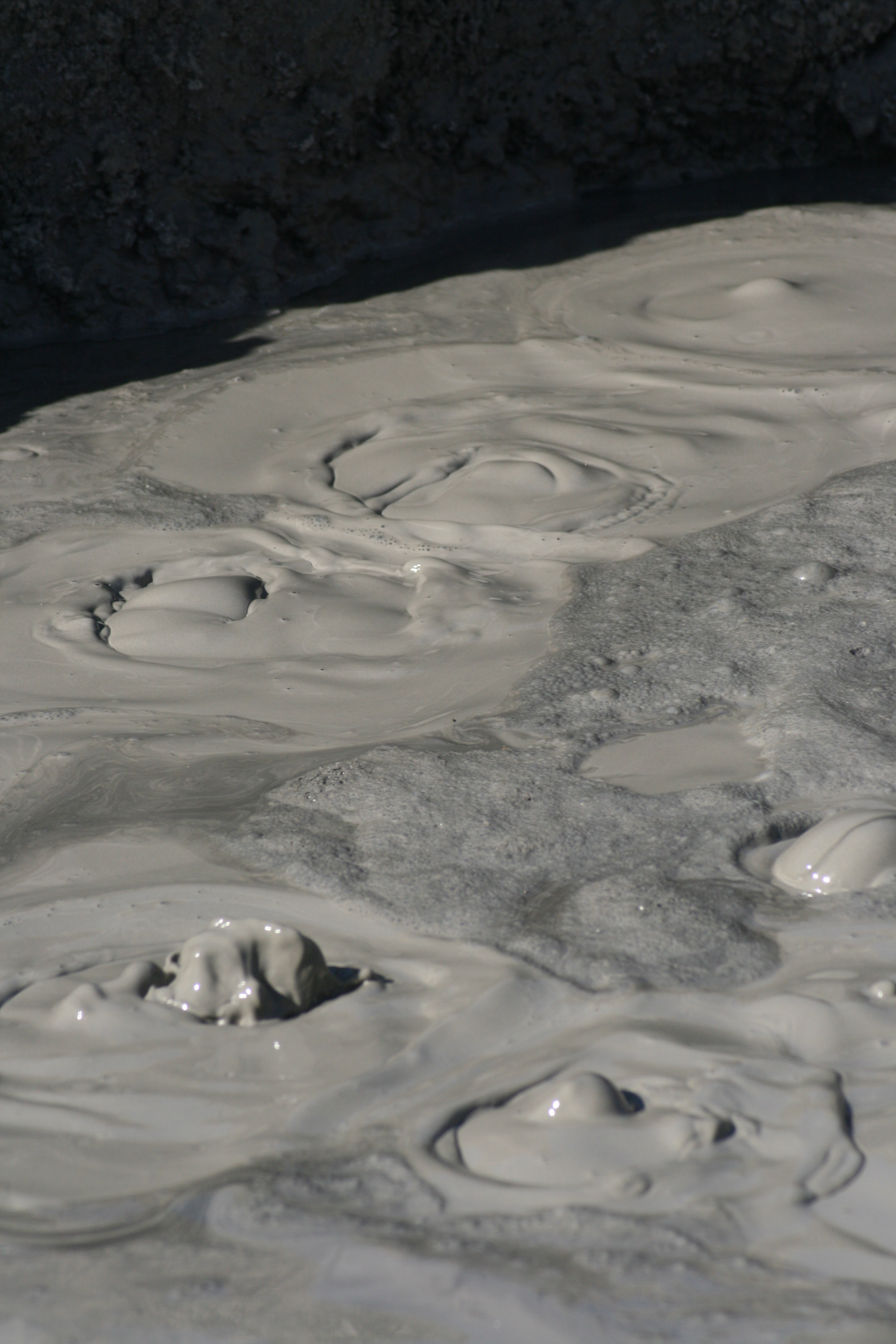
A gaseous mud volcano

Evidence of geothermal activity is visible. The Salton Buttes are volcanoes in the geothermal field of the same name. Mudpots and mud volcanoes are found on the eastern side of the Salton Sea, including the mobile Niland Geyser.

The area is used for geothermal electricity generation, with plants located along the southeastern shore of the Salton Sea in Imperial County.

The geothermal activity below the Salton Sea loosens up lithium that can be mined. Due to increased demand for lithium, which is crucial for electric-vehicle battery production, the Salton Sea area is attracting attention, and the extraction of lithium is expected to boost the local economy. The California Energy Commission estimates the Salton Sea might produce 600k metric tons of lithium carbonate (Li_{2}CO_{3}) per year, of a reserve of 3.4 metric tons (3.3 long tons; 3.7 short tons). A vast reserve of lithium near the Salton Sea amounts to roughly one third of the global supply. Several groups have advocated using the newfound interest in the Salton Sea to facilitate restoration efforts.

The Salton Sea geothermal brine reservoir is located at depths of approximately 1 to 3 kilometres (0.62 to 1.86 mi) below ground and contains fluids at temperatures ranging from 250 to 380 °C (482 to 716 °F). Among valuable minerals the brine contains lithium (202 ppm ± 20%, i.e. more than in the Dead Sea, which is 30–40 ppm), rubidium (110 ppm ± 47%), caesium (19.8 ppm ± 15%), bromine (91 ppm ± 31% vs 5000 ppm in the Dead Sea). The lake also comprises chloride, sodium, calcium, potassium and other low-value minerals, that are difficult to separate. All these minerals add up to the total salinity of 24.3 ± 2.8%.

== Communities ==
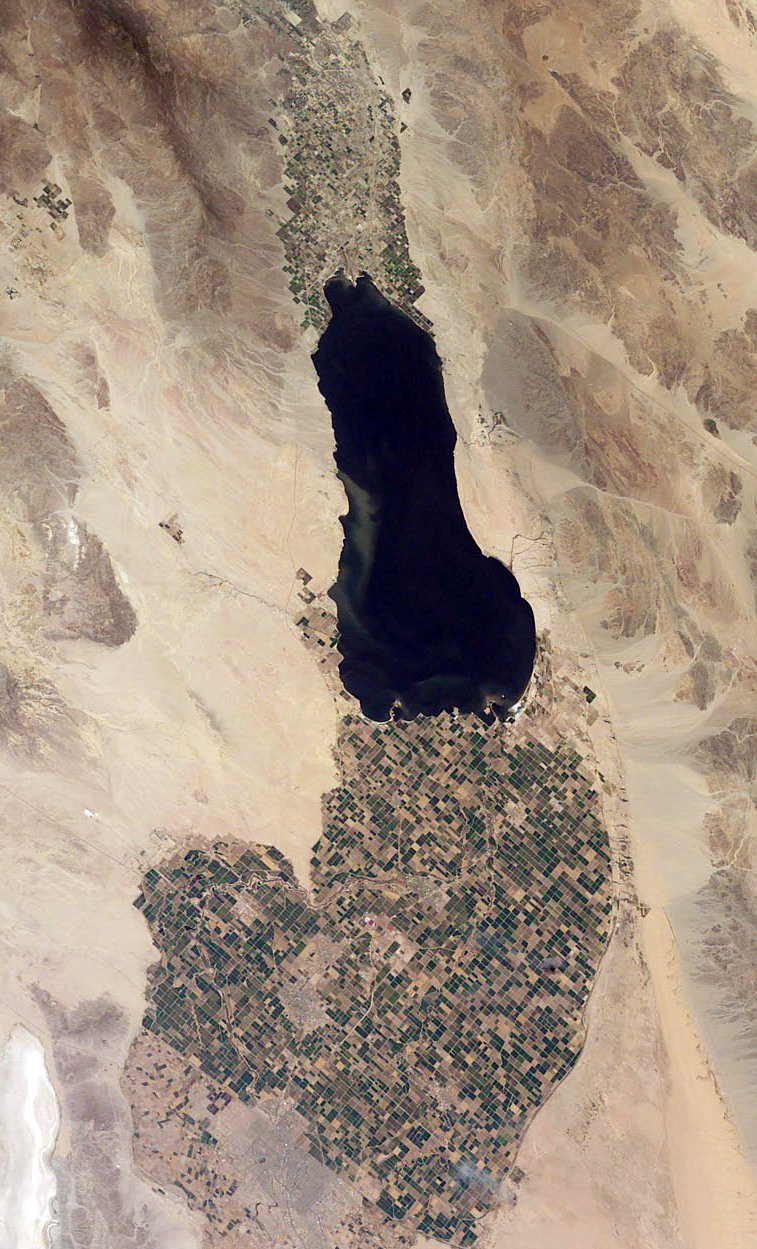
A 2002 satellite image of the Salton Sea with surrounding developments

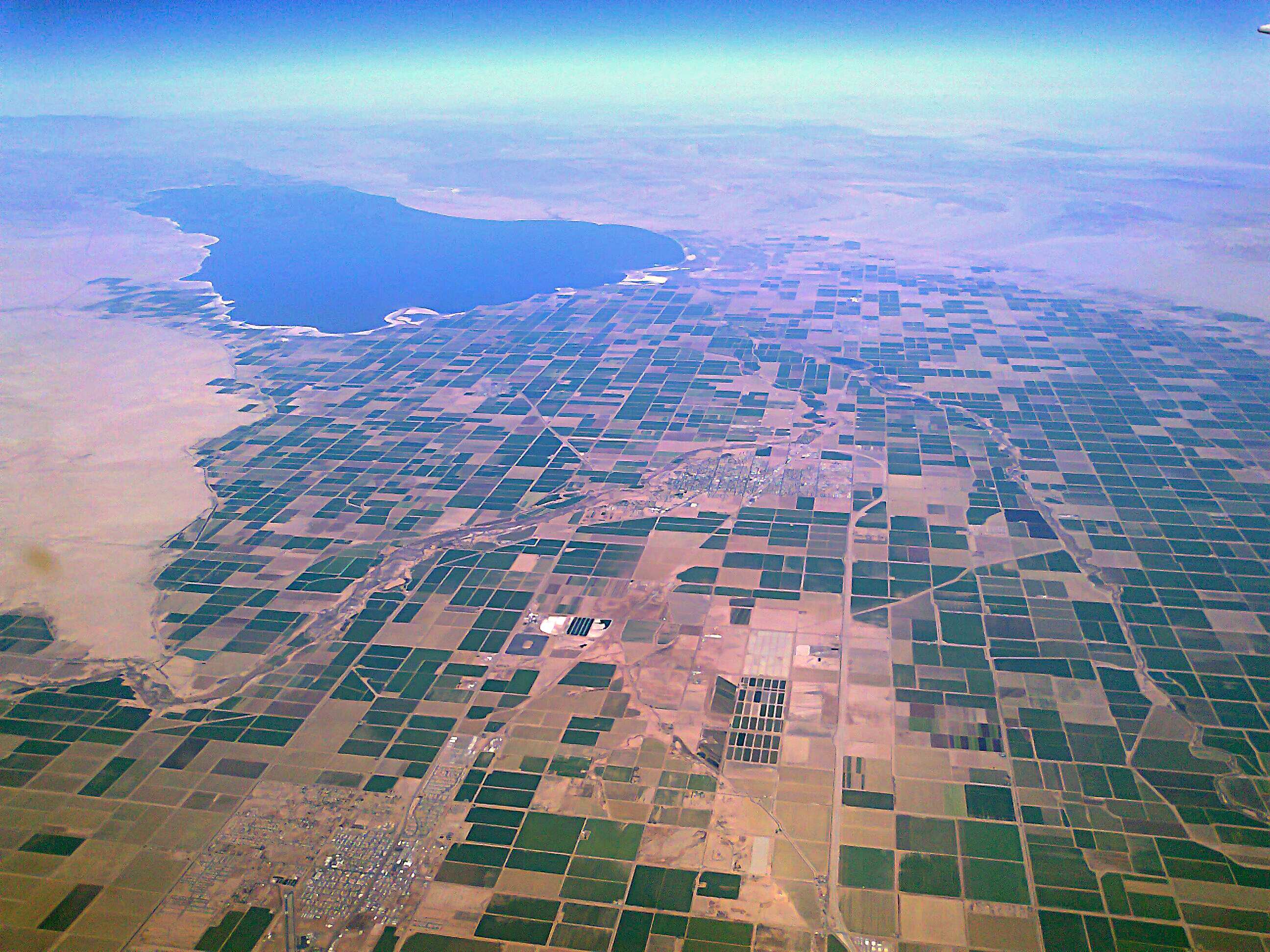
An aerial view of the Salton Sea from the south

In January 1940, the US Navy conducted a preliminary inspection of the Salton Sea. In October 1942, the Salton Sea Test Base, SSTB, run by Sandia Labs, was initially commissioned as the Naval Auxiliary Air Station Salton Sea. The SSTB, just to the southeast of Salton City, originally functioned as an operational and training base for seaplanes.

Additional activities at the base included experimental testing of solid-fuel plane-launched rockets, jet-assist take-off testing, aeroballistic testing of inert atomic weapon test units at land and marine target areas, training bombing at marine targets, testing of the effects of long-term storage on atomic weapons, testing of the Project Mercury space capsule parachute landing systems, parachute training and testing, and military training exercises. The base was abandoned in 1978.

The Salton Sea had some success as a resort area, with Salton City, Salton Sea Beach, and Desert Shores, on the western shore and Desert Beach, North Shore, and Bombay Beach, built on the eastern shore in the 1950s. Due to the increasing salinity and pollution of the lake over the years from agricultural runoff and other sources, the communities substantially shrank in size, or have been abandoned. The smell of the lake, combined with the stench of the decaying fish, also contributed to the decline of the tourist industry around the Salton Sea. The US Geological Survey describes the smell as "objectionable", "noxious", "unique", and "pervasive".

=== Arts and culture ===
A 2020 article provided this comment about the settlements around the Salton Sea:

Since 2011, Bombay Beach and its surrounds have been reinvented as a destination for desert art. It's not alone in that distinction – south of the city lie the towns of Niland and Slab City, other areas that have attracted artists and led to creations like East Jesus and Salvation Mountain.

Some people are visiting the Salton Sea and the surrounding settlements to explore the abandoned structures and see the squatter settlement of Slab City. The town of Niland is 1.5 miles (2.4 km) southeast of the sea, with a population of 1,006. In late June 2020, a fire in Niland caused a great deal of damage, displacing 112 people; by that time, the estimated population had diminished to 500.

The population of Bombay Beach declined for years and the buildings were rotting away, but some people had moved into the settlement. A news item in April 2018 stated that it was "enjoying a rebirth of sorts with an influx of artists, intellectuals and hipsters who have turned it into a bohemian playground". Many of the derelict structures and empty lots in the small settlement have been converted into elaborate art installations, including a large collection of elaborate sculptures built on the ruins of the former waterfront south of the dike. The 2016 dystopian film The Bad Batch used the area as a filming location for its surreal wasteland setting.

The roads and house foundations around the Salton Sea are starting to fail due to increased seismic activity and soil erosion. Bridges on Highway 86 are routinely separating from the roads and dangerously uneven pavement is constantly needing to be addressed. Deadly accidents are increasing as a result of road conditions and the influx of sandstorms in the area.

== Recreation ==
The Salton Sea State Recreation Area offers hunting, fishing, swimming, and camping to visitors on the northeastern side of the sea.

=== Powerboat racing ===
"Low barometric pressure and greater water density make the Salton Sea the fastest body of water in the world for speedboat racing," according to an article in the January–February 1950 issue of National Motorist magazine. This statement erroneously conflates low barometric pressure with low altitude, when the opposite is true, and the extremely low altitude of the region provides higher barometric pressure, beneficial for internal combustion engines. "The low altitude was thought to be ideal for carburetion and there was talk that this was the 'fastest body of water in the world.'" Beginning in the late 1920s, these properties have made the Salton Sea attractive as a venue for such races.

Although these natural advantages were at first attacked as unfair by other courses, by the mid 1930s the Salton Sea racing organization was backed by the National Power Boat Association and attracting some of the best boats and drivers in the US. Races were held at Desert Beach annually between 1941 and 1951 and subsequently at other beaches, ultimately on the west side of the Sea.

From 1961 through 1965, the Sea hosted the Salton City 500, a marathon endurance race which attracted drivers as notable as Mickey Thompson and astronaut Gordon Cooper.

After a lengthy hiatus, in 2008 racing returned when new world records were set by a sprint boat at the Salton Sea Speed Week.

== In popular culture ==
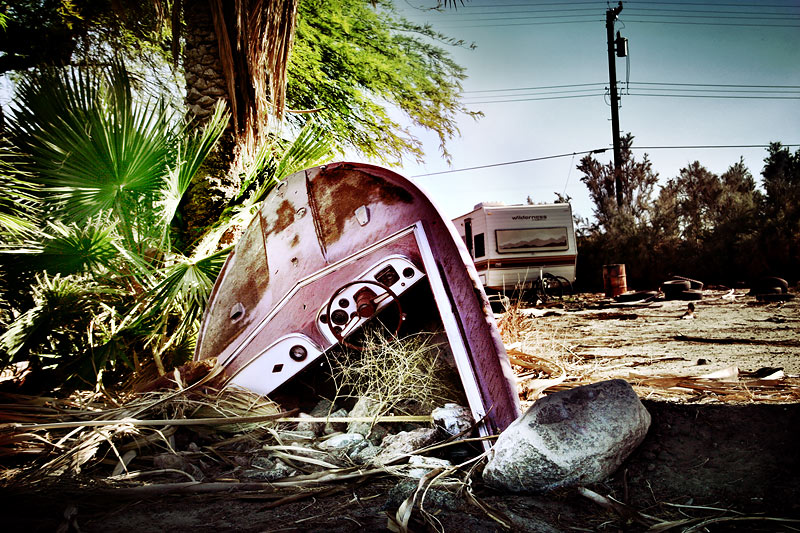
An abandoned boat stuck in the ground, close to the west coast marina of the Salton Sea

- A visit to the Salton Sea inspired filmmaker Curtis Harrington to make his dreamlike short film On the Edge (1949), which extensively uses the bubbling mudpots on the edge of the sea. In a 1971 interview, Harrington stated, "The location I used is entirely covered by water now; the sea has risen to cover it."
- Highway Dragnet is a 1954 American film noir B film crime film directed by Nathan Juran from a story by U.S. Andersen and Roger Corman. Corman said the story was based on a trip he had taken to the Salton Sea.
- In the film The Monster That Challenged the World (1957), gigantic prehistoric mollusks are discovered to be residing at the bottom of the Salton Sea.
- The album cover for Jeff Lynne's Armchair Theatre (1990) was photographed by the Salton Sea.
- The video for Michael Jackson's In the Closet (1992) was filmed in Salton Sea.
- The Salton Sea (2002), by Tony Gayton, directed by D. J. Caruso and starring Val Kilmer, Vincent D'Onofrio and Peter Sarsgaard.
- Plagues & Pleasures on the Salton Sea (2006), by filmmakers Chris Metzler and Jeff Springer is narrated by John Waters. Melding high camp with stark realism the film covers the first 100 years of the history of the Salton Sea featuring rare archival photos and footage, plus interviews with the residents who call the Salton Sea home.
- The History Channel's 2006 episode "Engineering Disasters 18" (#13-04), from the television documentary series Modern Marvels, describes the combined manmade and natural events leading to the creation of the Salton Sea in the early 20th century, its brief popularity as a resort destination midcentury, and its subsequent decline due to high salinity and farm runoff. Impacts to Salton Sea fish and bird populations are addressed and future plans to rescue the sea are described.
- The rock band Linkin Park shot the front and back pictures for their third album Minutes to Midnight on the shores of Salton Sea, near the ruins of North Shore Beach and Yacht Club, in 2007.
- The Salton Sea and surrounding area was prominently featured in the 2007 film Into The Wild. In the film, the primary character, Chris McCandless (played by Emile Hirsch) makes stops at several nearby locations, including Slab City and Salvation Mountain.
- The Salton Sea is used in the 2009 music video Elephants by Rachael Yamagata. Also featured in the music video is the North Shore Motel.
- The Alamo Sea in the 2013 video game Grand Theft Auto V is based on the Salton Sea.
- The short documentary, The Useless Sea (2016), is a film focusing on the environmental challenges and the beauty surrounding the Salton Sea.
- The album cover for Weyes Blood's Front Row Seat to Earth (2016) was photographed by the Salton Sea.
- Miracle in the Desert: The Rise and Fall of the Salton Sea (2020) is a documentary by filmmaker Greg Bassenian that tells the full origin of the creation of the sea, as well as the real estate boom and bust from 1950 to 1970 while examining the exodus of people from the sea and the current environmental crisis it faces.
- The film Don't Come Back from the Moon (2017) was filmed mostly in Bombay Beach, CA.

== See also ==
- Outline of the Salton Sea
- Timeline of the Salton Sea
- Bibliography of the Salton Sea
- List of drying lakes
- List of lakes in California
- List of lakes of the Colorado Desert

== Bibliography ==
- The Salton Sea Restoration Project: Opportunities and Challenges. Salton Sea Project Office (Report). US Bureau of Reclamation. June 1999. Archived from the original on October 11, 2004.
- Overview and Summary of Salton Sea Restoration Project Draft EIS/EIR. Salton Sea Project Office (Report). U.S. Bureau of Reclamation. January 2000. Archived from the original on May 8, 2019.
- Salton Sea Restoration: Final Preferred Project Report (PDF) (Report). Salton Sea Authority. July 2004. Archived from the original (PDF) on October 12, 2004.
- Salton Sea Authority Plan for Multi-Purpose Project (PDF) (Report). Salton Sea Authority. June 29, 2006. Archived from the original (PDF) on December 11, 2022.
- Restoration of the Salton Sea Final Report (Report). U.S. Bureau of Reclamation. December 2007. Archived from the original on December 5, 2023.
- Restoring the Salton Sea (Report). California Legislative Analyst's Office. January 24, 2008. Archived from the original on December 5, 2023.
- Overview of Management and Restoration Activities in the Salton Sea (Report). Congressional Research Service. September 24, 2013. Archived from the original on December 5, 2023.
- Water Bond Priorities: California's responsibility and greatest opportunity to revitalize a dying ecosystem (PDF) (Report). Salton Sea Authority. October 30, 2013. Archived from the original (PDF) on December 2, 2016.
- Salton Sea Funding and Feasibility Action Plan – Benchmark 7: Project Summary (PDF) (Report). Salton Sea Authority. May 2016. Archived (PDF) from the original on December 19, 2022.
- The Salton Sea: A Status Update (Report). California Legislative Analyst's Office. August 29, 2018. Archived from the original on October 30, 2023.
- Salton Sea Restoration (Report). Congressional Research Service. December 1, 2020. Archived from the original on December 5, 2023.
