= Niland Geyser =

Moving mudpot near Niland, California

- Mud pot
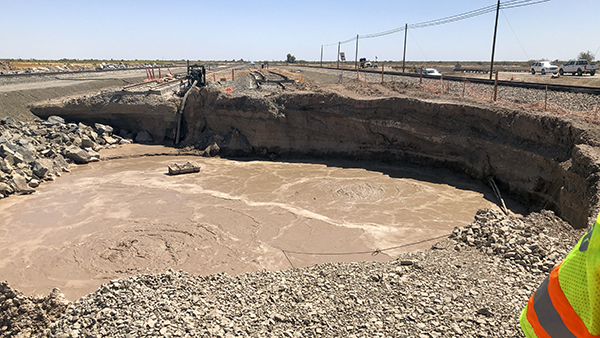
- Niland Geyser in 2019

- Location within California
- Coordinates: 33°17′06″N 115°34′37″W
- Location: Imperial County, California
- Elevation: −58 m (−190 ft)

Niland Geyser (nicknamed the "Slow One" and formally designated W9) is a moving mudpot or mud spring outside Niland, California in the Salton Trough in an area of geological instability due to the San Andreas Fault, formed due to carbon dioxide being released underground. It is the only mudpot or mud volcano known to have moved so significantly. The geyser has required costly engineering works since 2018 as it has impinged on the Union Pacific Railroad, California State Route 111, and other infrastructure.

== History ==
The "geyser" formed around 1953 about 5 miles (8.0 km) northwest of Niland in Mundo, just south of Gillespie Road and east of Route 111 and Davis Road. In 2008, David Lynch and Kenneth Hudnut described it as a "Large active shieldlike pot" located on private land at 33°17.117′ -115°34.620' and gave it the designation W9. It is one of around 33 mud pots and mud volcanoes near the south-eastern shore of the Salton Sea, mainly in a line likely linked to a fault line although W9 is an outlier.

In 2015 or 2016, possibly following seismic activity though this is disputed by the United States Geological Survey, the geyser began to move unprecedentedly quickly south-west, as judged by satellite images. Before the recent movement the spring released water to the south and west from 2005, with the Imperial Irrigation District digging a trench in 2014 in an unsuccessful attempt to direct water away from the Union Pacific Railroad. In October 2017, it released a large volume of muddy water into drainage ditches to the east of the tracks. It has moved at a rate of about 20 feet (6.1 m) per year in 2018 then 10 feet (3.0 m) per month by 2020.

By late 2018, it had created a 24,000-square-foot (2,200-square-meter) basin. It is near the Wister fault, an extension of the San Andreas fault, and is moving perpendicular to fault lines. Its slow movement has seen it called the Slow One, an allusion to the expected Big One earthquake. It is disputed whether other mud springs have moved; most sources say none are known to have done so while Max Rudolph of UC Davis says some have but only noticeably on a timescale of decades.

=== Mitigation ===
==== Union Pacific Railroad ====
In May 2018, the railroad employed geological surveyors from the company Shannon & Wilson to assess the site and they in turn involved David Lynch, a Caltech researcher who had previously studied the mud pots. They found that small waves from the geyser were gradually eroding the edge of the caldera. As the geyser moved towards critical transport infrastructure over summer 2018, Imperial County declared an emergency in June, which was extended in August.

Engineers dug three wells to attempt to release pressure; the first caused a blowout of 100 feet (30 m) of muddy water, though the second did not meet significant amounts of gas or water, and the third needed to be sunk to a depth of 400 feet (120 m) to hit gas. They also dumped riprap into the western edge, pumped surface water away at a rate of 40,000 gallons per day to reveal the bottom at 25 feet (7.6 m) deep, and in June 2018 they sank steel sheeting 75–80 feet (23–24 m) deep and 100 feet (30 m) wide between the geyser and railroad tracks. The original pool was emptied, but several small mud pots were still in the basin.

However, these efforts were unsuccessful. By the middle of July the bubbling water had reached the steel wall and in October 2018 the geyser breached the steel wall and continued under it. Driven by an expulsion of gas, a 25-foot-deep (7.6-meter) and 70-foot-wide (21-meter) sinkhole appeared on the track side of the wall and then filled with water. The engineers repeatedly backfilled the eastern side of the caldera with riprap, which was swallowed by the hole, though the basin left to the east was eventually filled by mid-October. The geyser intersected with the Union Pacific Railroad in late 2018, with major engineering work required to allow freight rail traffic of around 70 trains per day between Inland Empire and Yuma, Arizona to continue, though speeds were reduced. These works included building temporary tracks called a shoofly in October, which required weekly tamping to keep operational. A second shoofly was built on the eastern side, where the geyser had come from.

==== State Route 111 ====
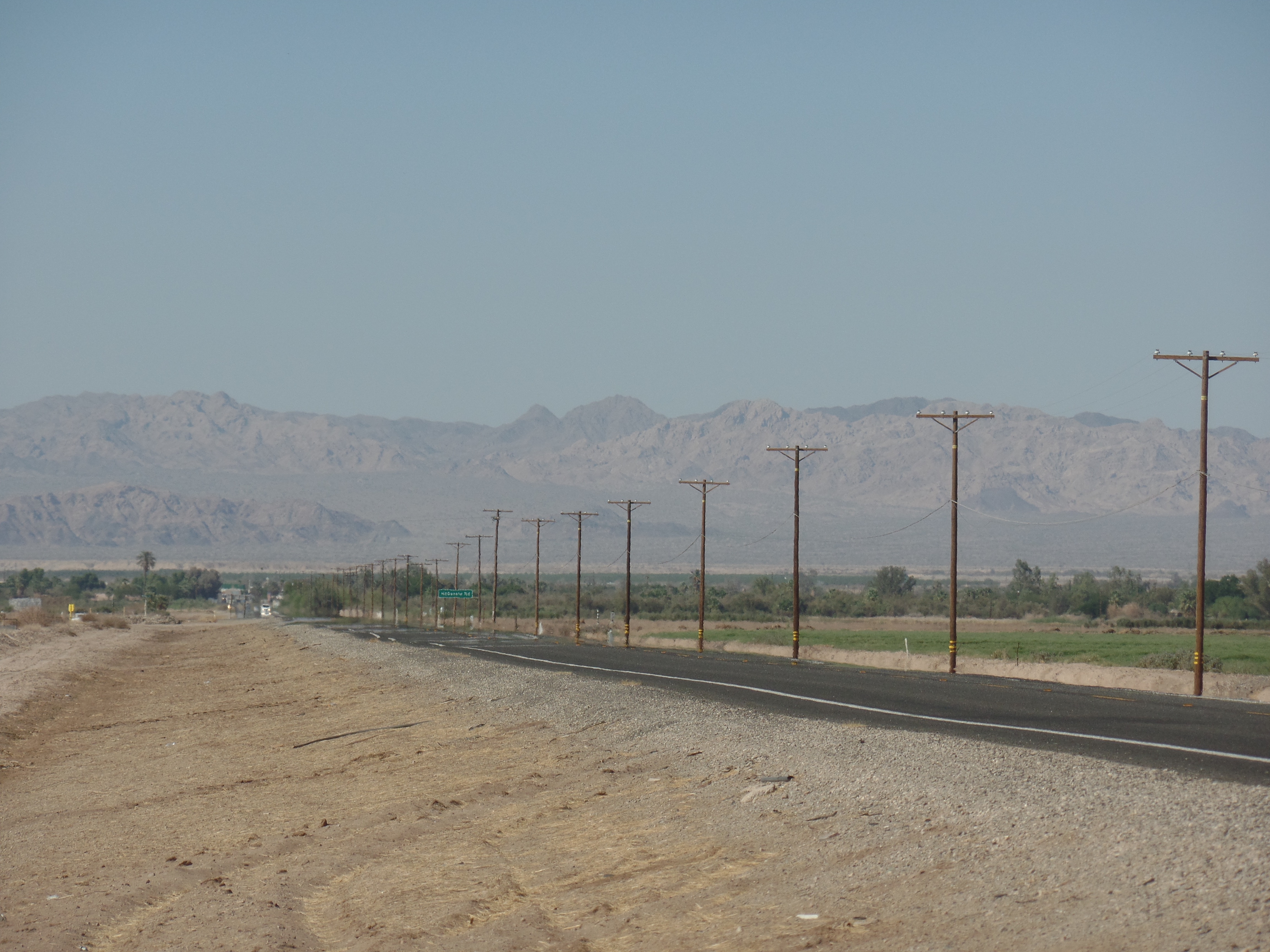
State Route 111 near Niland in 2016

In September 2019 Caltrans began a three-phase $19-21.5 million mitigation project to protect California State Route 111, which goes from Interstate 10 to Mexico. The plans included using steel walls to divert water into a gravel wash, digging drainage under the road to direct subsurface water to a wash west of the road, and building a 5-mile (8.0 km) temporary road 50 feet (15 m) to the west to divert around the geyser, with the original road being rebuilt once the geyser had passed. In late September 2019, the road was closed for two weeks at Davis and Gillespie Roads for mitigation measures including building drainage, reducing custom to local businesses and tourism. Through traffic was diverted to the west of the Salton Sea along California State Route 86.

Work was done in August 2020 with the closure of one lane for a week, with a reduced speed limit in place. Imperial County Board of Supervisors approved further emergency mitigation measures in October 2020. Further work was completed in April 2021 to extend the temporary road, again briefly closing one lane of traffic. As of December 2021, the movement had slowed to 3 feet (0.91 m) per month and the geyser had begun to undermine the old road's surface.

==== Other infrastructure ====
The Santa Fe Pacific Pipeline owned by Kinder Morgan that transports fuel from San Diego to Imperial was diverted at a cost of $3 million in early 2019. By 2020 the geyser threatened fiber-optic lines owned by Verizon and AT&T, which were moved.

Assuming the geyser continues in the same direction towards the Salton Sea 2 miles (3.2 km) away, it may further cross a parking lot, a minor road, ponds, and fields. However, Shawn Rizzutto of California Department of Transportation said in 2025 that the mud pond had not moved since around 2019.

== Composition ==
Geyser is a misnomer because the formation is not geothermal and the water, mud, and bubbling gas is not heated, only measuring about 80 °F (27 °C). The Niland geyser releases water, carbon dioxide, and hydrogen sulfide, with the bottom of the pool like quicksand due to liquefaction. Geologists from the railroad found that a pressure dome is pushing water into the geyser. It is thought to be caused by underground carbon dioxide, released from rocks by tectonic processes as the San Andreas Fault and the East Pacific Rise interact and compress sediment from the Colorado River into sandstone and greenschist rock. The hydrogen sulfide released from the pool, easily recognisable by its rotten egg smell, may originate from rotting algae or from geological activity. Repeated seismic activity cracked the bedrock, enabling gases to reach the surface. The surrounding rock is soft sedimentary mudstone.

Geologists David Lynch and Travis Deane have hypothesised that the carbon dioxide is travelling to the surface via a tilted route, with the upper side of the channel gradually being eroded by the water and gas and the lower side building up as sediment falls onto it. This would explain the horizontal movement of the spring, which would be expected to stop when the spring is directly above the source.

For safety reasons, there is no public access. The carbon dioxide released from the geyser tends to fill its crater, making it an extreme danger of suffocation for anybody in close proximity though the concentration drops within a few feet.

== See also ==
- Sidoarjo mud flow
