= Miracle in the Desert: The Rise and Fall of the Salton Sea =

- Directed by: Greg Bassenian
- Release date: September 22, 2020
- Country: United States
- Language: English

Miracle in the Desert: The Rise and Fall of the Salton Sea is a 2020 feature-length documentary film that was directed by Greg Bassenian. The film chronicles the origins of the creation of the Salton Sea in 1905, the 1960s economic boom of the sea, as well as the current environmental challenges that it faces. It also includes interviews with local citizens as well as state and city-level officials involved in the current efforts to mitigate and/or restore the Salton Sea.

== Synopsis ==
Miracle in the Desert: The Rise and Fall of the Salton Sea chronicles the origins of the creation of the Salton Sea in 1905 up through current day 2020, as well as a large overview of Imperial Valley history and the origins of the Imperial Valley. It also covers the current political and environmental initiatives around the sea due to issues such as water rights transfers that are causing the sea to decline due to less influx of water to the farm of the Imperial Valley. The documentary features interviews with state and local officials, as well as citizens living near the Salton Sea, gaining their perspective on the current state of the Salton Sea and possible large scale restoration solutions.

== Release ==
The film was released to digital streaming platforms and DVD September 22, 2020, by documentary studio Gravitas Ventures.

== Awards ==
The film won the 2020 Best Documentary Prize at the Borrego Springs Film Festival.
