= Robert H. Dunlap =

American Marine Corps general (1879–1931)

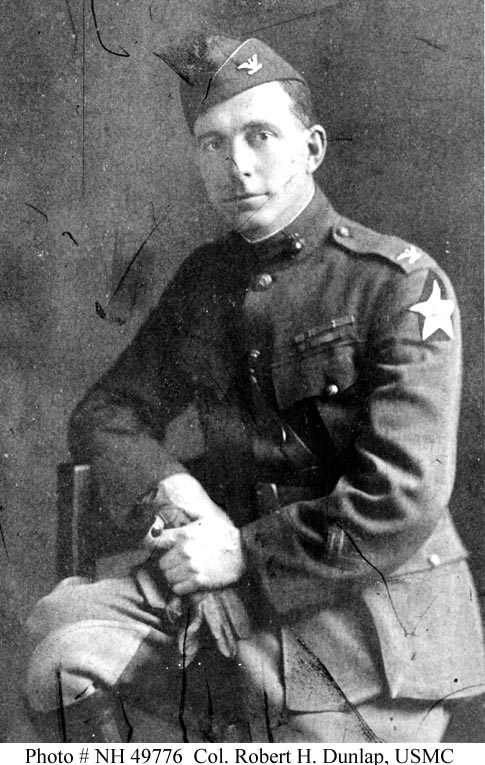
- Born: December 22, 1879; Washington, D.C., United States
- Died: May 19, 1931 (aged 51) Cinq-Mars-la-Pile, Indre-et-Loire, France
- Buried: Arlington National Cemetery
- Allegiance: United States of America
- Branch: United States Marine Corps
- Service years: 1898–1931
- Rank: Brigadier General
- Commands: Seventeenth Regiment of Army Field Artillery (in France)
- Conflicts: Spanish–American War; Philippine–American War; Boxer Rebellion; Occupation of Veracruz; Banana Wars: Occupation of Haiti; Occupation of the Dominican Republic; Occupation of Nicaragua; World War I
- Awards: Navy Cross; Navy Distinguished Service Medal; French Fourragère

Robert Henry Dunlap (December 22, 1879 – May 19, 1931) was a general in the United States Marine Corps.

== Military career ==
Born in Washington, D.C., Dunlap was appointed a second lieutenant in the Marine Corps August 8, 1898. He served with distinction in the Spanish–American War; in the Philippine–American War Dunlap was attached to the Marine Corps' Philippines regiment from May 1899 to May 1902; during that period served in China from June 25, 1900, to October 9, 1900, and participated in the Battle of Tientsin and in China, including the Battle of Tientsin of the Boxer Rebellion. He was stationed on the Isthmus of Panama, then participated in the U.S. occupation of Veracruz, Mexico, in 1914.

From September 1915 to February 1917 Dunlap commanded the artillery battalion in Haiti and Santo Domingo and during this period participated in the engagement at Guayacanes, Dominican Republic, on July 3, 1916.

Dunlap was assigned to the staff of General Pershing on 21 May 1917. He returned to the United States in July of that year and in August was detailed to command the Tenth Regiment of Mobile Artillery at Quantico, Virginia. He was absent on temporary foreign shore service for duty with the planning section of the staff of the commander, United States forces operating in European waters from 18 February 1918 to 10 October 1918, when he was detached to command the Tenth Regiment of Marines upon its arrival in France. He was detached from this command on 20 November 1918, having been in command of the Seventeenth Regiment of Field Artillery, United States Army, from 30 October, and participated in the Meuse-Argonne in command of that organization in November until the Armistice. He participated in the march to the Rhine and continued on duty with the American Expeditionary Forces until 8 February 1919, when he returned to the US.

Dunlap studied at the Army General Staff College from 1920 to 1922, then he commanded the Marine detachment at the American Legation in Peking, China from 1922 to 1924. In 1924 he assumed command of the Marine Corps Schools at Quantico, Virginia, where he remained until January 1928 when he went to Nicaragua to take command of the Eleventh Regiment of Marines and later the Second Brigade. He returned to the United States in August 1929.

For his distinguished service as regimental commander during the Meuse-Argonne campaign in World War I, he was awarded a Citation Certificate by Commander-in-Chief, A.E.F.; the French Fourragère; and the Navy Cross. In 1917–18 he analyzed a proposed Allied landing in the Adriatic for Admiral William Sims and concluded that amphibious operations could be successful and there was no absolute advantage for the defender. In 1928 he was awarded the Navy Distinguished Service Medal and the Medal of Merit of Nicaragua for his service in that country.

Dunlap assumed command of the Marine Corps base at San Diego, California on 25 January 1930. He relinquished that command on 26 December 1930, returning to Washington D.C. to receive an assignment in France. He was posted to France to study Strategy at the French War College. He and his wife departed the US on 18 February 1931, planning to enroll at the French facility that autumn.

== Death ==
Brigadier General Dunlap sacrificed his life attempting to rescue a woman who had been trapped under a collapsing wall in France on May 19, 1931. He was buried in Arlington National Cemetery on 13 June 1931. After his wife's passing in 1970, she was buried alongside his grave. For his gallant rescue attempt, Dunlap was posthumously awarded the Navy Cross.

On 19 May 1931, a press release described the accident which took Dunlap's life: "A battalion of engineers, aided by an army tank and working in the light of a blazing battery of searchlights is battering away desperately tonight at 20,000 tons of rock and debris in a practically hopeless effort to save the life of Brigadier General Robert H. Dunlap, U.S. Marine Corps. General Dunlap was caught today in a landslide while making a gallant effort to rescue a dairy maid in the village of Cinqmars-la-Pile, twenty miles from Tours. The dairy maid and her husband were also caught in the slide and all three were believed to be dead ... General Dunlap, who had recently arrived in Paris to study strategy in the French War College, was taking a brief vacation with his wife before beginning his studies. He stopped ... for a chat with Denis Briant, a hired man on the farm where the general and his wife were staying. A woman's screams interrupted their conversation. It was Briant's wife, working in the milkhouse. Rocks from the hills above were crashing through the front wall and had already barred the milkhouse door, preventing her escape. The general rushed to her aid, closely followed by Briant. Both men were buried before they reached the woman." The wall had been undermined by rain, and collapsed when the ground underneath it gave way, causing the rocks to tumble down the hillside into the building. Mrs. Dunlap was a witness of her husband's action. She said, "It all happened in an instant. We saw the wall begin to move as the land sunk below it, and my husband leaped forward to warn and to help the woman ... her husband, too, sprang forward, then the whole wall and the face of the hill collapsed and they were swallowed up."

French Army rescuers eventually uncovered the victims and found the woman still alive. She survived but had one leg amputated.

Dunlap's funeral was held in Paris on 23 May 1931, after which his body was returned to the US. Dunlap and his wife Katharine Wood Dunlap (1884–1970) are buried together at Arlington National Cemetery.

== Awards ==
=== First Navy Cross citation ===
Citation:

The President of the United States of America takes pleasure in presenting the Navy Cross to Colonel Robert Henry Dunlap (MCSN: 0-249), United States Marine Corps, for exceptionally meritorious and distinguished service. As Regimental Commander of the 17th Field Artillery, 2d Division, A.E.F., during the Argonne-Meuse Campaign, September to November, 1918, Colonel Dunlap displayed great ability as a leader and commander of men, and the success of his regiment was in no small measure due to his untiring energy and push, and to the offensive spirit which he displayed on many occasions.

=== Second Navy Cross citation ===
Citation:

The President of the United States of America takes pride in presenting a Gold Star in lieu of a Second Award of the Navy Cross (Posthumously) to Brigadier General Robert Henry Dunlap (MCSN: 0-249), United States Marine Corps, for distinguishing himself conspicuously by extraordinary courage on 19 May 1931, at La Fariniere, Cinq-Mars-la-Pile, France, where he met his death in a supreme effort to save the life of a French peasant woman.

== Namesake ==
USS Dunlap (DD-384) was named for him. His widow, Katherine Wood Dunlap (1884–1970), christened the ship.

Camp Dunlap in Southern California was named after him.

The Marine Corps War College is located in Dunlap Hall aboard Marine Corps Base Quantico, Virginia.
