= Niland, California =

Niland
- Census-designated place
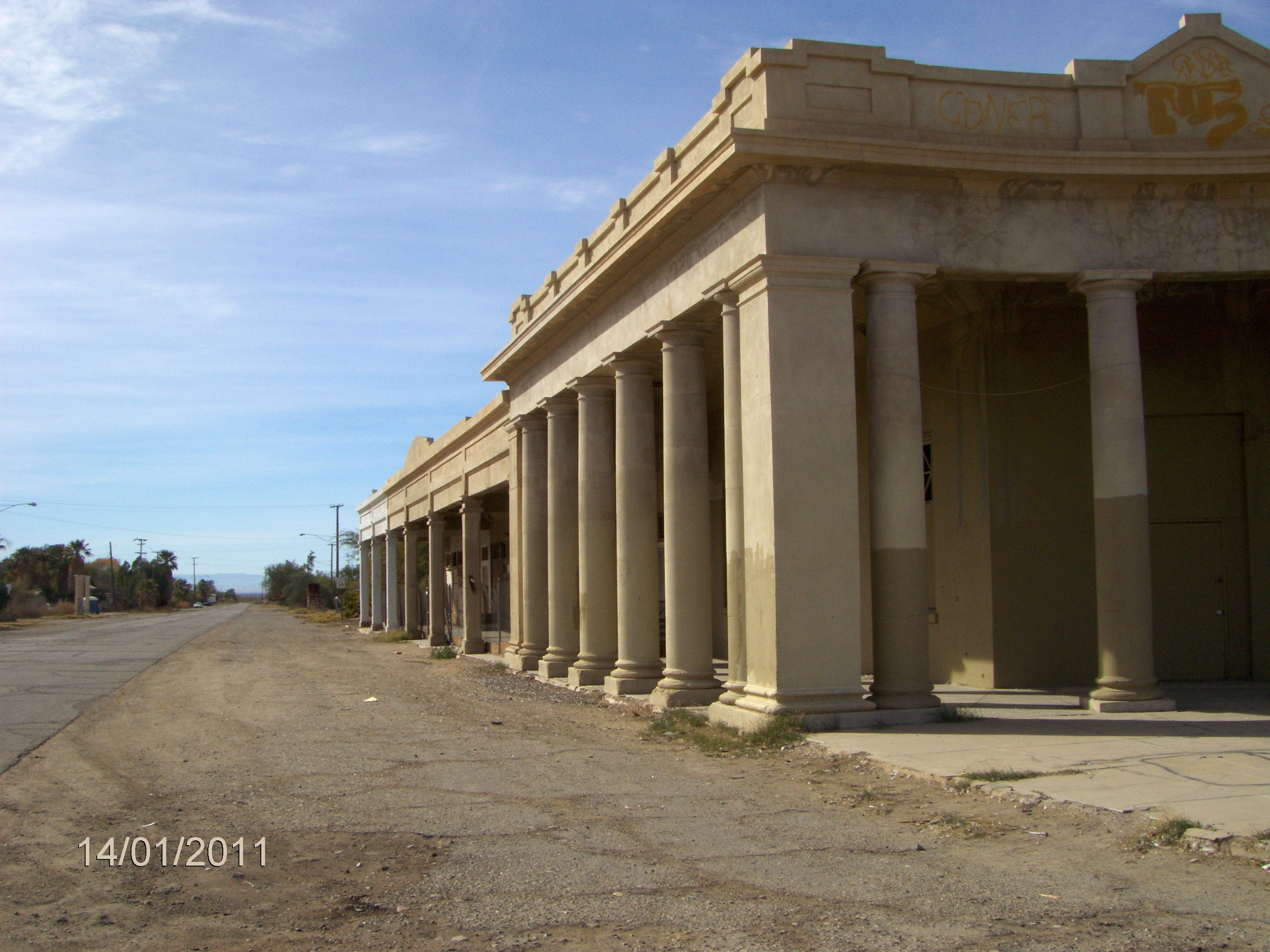
- Abandoned commercial building in Niland

- Location in Imperial County and the state of California

- Location in the United States
- Coordinates: 33°14′24″N 115°31′08″W
- Country: United States
- State: California
- County: Imperial

Area
  - Total: 0.402 sq mi (1.040 km^{2})
  - Land: 0.402 sq mi (1.040 km^{2})
  - Water: 0 sq mi (0 km^{2}) 0%
- Elevation: −141 ft (−43 m)

Population (2020)
  - Total: 756
  - Density: 1,880/sq mi (727/km^{2})
- Time zone: UTC-8 (Pacific)
  - Summer (DST): UTC-7 (PDT)
- ZIP code: 92257
- Area codes: 442/760
- FIPS code: 06-51392
- GNIS feature IDs: 1652758, 2408926

Niland (formerly Old Beach, Imperial Junction, and Hobgood) is a census-designated place (CDP) in Imperial County, California, United States. The town is located 8 miles (13 km) north of Calipatria, 2 miles (3.2 km) southeast of the Salton Sea. The population was 1,006 at the 2010 census, down from 1,143 in 2000. The 2020 census reported Niland's population at 756. By June 2020, however, after a major fire, the estimated population had diminished to 500. It is part of the El Centro, California Metropolitan Statistical Area.

== History ==
The Old Beach post office operated from 1905 to 1907. The Imperial Junction post office opened in 1910, changed its name to Hobgood in 1913, and to Niland in 1914. The name Hobgood honors pioneer Richard H. Hobgood. The name Niland was coined by the Imperial Farm Lands Association from "Nile Land", a commendatory name for the supposed fertility of the place. Niland used to have a significant Filipino American community, of about a thousand people in the 1950s, however following the collapse of the tomato industry, the population of Filipinos in Niland has greatly reduced.

From 1904 to 1960, Niland was the northern terminus of the Inter-California Railway.

== Government and utilities ==
The Niland County Service area, operated by the Imperial County Department of Public Works, provides street lighting to Niland.

Niland is served by Golden State Water Company's Calipatria system.

== Demographics ==
Historical population
Census	Pop.	Note	%±
1990	1,183		—
2000	1,143		−3.4%
2010	1,006		−12.0%
2020	756		−24.9%
U.S. Decennial Census; 1860–1870 1880-1890; 1900 1910 1920; 1930 1940 1950; 1960 1970 1980; 1990 2000 2010; 2020

Niland first appeared as a census designated place in the 1990 U.S. census.

=== 2020 ===
Niland CDP, California – Racial and ethnic composition Note: the US Census treats Hispanic/Latino as an ethnic category. This table excludes Latinos from the racial categories and assigns them to a separate category. Hispanics/Latinos may be of any race.
Race / Ethnicity (NH = Non-Hispanic)	Pop 2000	Pop 2010	Pop 2020	% 2000	% 2010	% 2020
White alone (NH)	408	299	133	35.70%	29.72%	17.59%
Black or African American alone (NH)	30	28	26	2.62%	2.78%	3.44%
Native American or Alaska Native alone (NH)	9	18	5	0.79%	1.79%	0.66%
Asian alone (NH)	39	20	6	3.41%	1.99%	0.79%
Native Hawaiian or Pacific Islander alone (NH)	0	0	1	0.00%	0.00%	0.13%
Other race alone (NH)	2	6	1	0.17%	0.60%	0.13%
Mixed race or Multiracial (NH)	23	17	23	2.01%	1.69%	3.04%
Hispanic or Latino (any race)	632	618	561	55.29%	61.43%	74.21%
Total	1,143	1,006	756	100.00%	100.00%	100.00%

=== 2000 ===
As of the census of 2000, there were 1,143 people, 422 households, and 281 families residing in the CDP. The population density was 2,813.3 inhabitants per square mile (1,086.2/km^{2}). There were 530 housing units at an average density of 1,304.5 per square mile (503.7/km^{2}). The racial makeup of the CDP was 55.3% of the population were Hispanic / Latino of any race, 54.8% White, 3.2% Black or African American, 2.0% Native American, 4.6% Asian, 28.1% from other races, and 7.4% from two or more races.

There were 422 households, out of which 33.6% had children under the age of 18 living with them, 39.3% were married couples living together, 18.2% had a female householder with no husband present, and 33.4% were non-families. 29.1% of all households were made up of individuals, and 14.7% had someone living alone who was 65 years of age or older. The average household size was 2.7 and the average family size was 3.3.

In the CDP, the population was spread out, with 30.0% under the age of 18, 8.0% from 18 to 24, 24.0% from 25 to 44, 22.4% from 45 to 64, and 15.6% who were 65 years of age or older. The median age was 36 years. For every 100 females, there were 100.2 males. For every 100 females age 18 and over, there were 105.7 males.

The median income for a household in the CDP was $25,592, and the median income for a family was $27,500. Males had a median income of $36,786 versus $26,250 for females. The per capita income for the CDP was $11,297. About 15.1% of families and 21.4% of the population were below the poverty line, including 19.8% of those under age 18 and 12.4% of those age 65 or over.

=== 2010 ===
The 2010 United States census reported that Niland had a population of 1,006. The population density was 2,504.8 inhabitants per square mile (967.1/km^{2}). The racial makeup of Niland was 539 (53.6%) White, 36 (3.6%) African American, 20 (2.0%) Native American, 36 (3.6%) Asian, 0 (0.0%) Pacific Islander, 315 (31.3%) from other races, and 60 (6.0%) from two or more races. There were 618 Hispanic or Latino residents, of any race (61.4%).

The Census reported that 1,006 people (100% of the population) lived in households, 0 (0%) lived in non-institutionalized group quarters, and 0 (0%) were institutionalized.

There were 367 households, out of which 131 (35.7%) had children under the age of 18 living in them, 143 (39.0%) were opposite-sex married couples living together, 83 (22.6%) had a female householder with no husband present, 30 (8.2%) had a male householder with no wife present. There were 25 (6.8%) unmarried opposite-sex partnerships, and 5 (1.4%) same-sex married couples or partnerships. 99 households (27.0%) were made up of individuals, and 49 (13.4%) had someone living alone who was 65 years of age or older. The average household size was 2.74. There were 256 families (69.8% of all households); the average family size was 3.27.

The population dispersal was 248 people (24.7%) under the age of 18, 99 people (9.8%) aged 18 to 24, 215 people (21.4%) aged 25 to 44, 284 people (28.2%) aged 45 to 64, and 160 people (15.9%) who were 65 years of age or older. The median age was 39.6 years. For every 100 females, there were 96.9 males. For every 100 females age 18 and over, there were 94.4 males.

There were 489 housing units at an average density of 1,217.5 per square mile (470.1/km^{2}), of which 367 were occupied, of which 189 (51.5%) were owner-occupied, and 178 (48.5%) were occupied by renters. The homeowner vacancy rate was 7.4%; the rental vacancy rate was 23.3%. 497 people (49.4% of the population) lived in owner-occupied housing units and 509 people (50.6%) lived in rental housing units.

=== 2020 ===
In the 2020 US Census the community's population was reported as 756.

== Politics ==
In the state legislature, Niland is in the 18th senatorial district, represented by Democrat Steve Padilla, and the 36th Assembly district, represented by Republican Jeff Gonzalez.

Federally, Niland is in California's 25th congressional district, represented by Democrat Raul Ruiz.

== Climate ==
This area has a large amount of sunshine year round due to its stable descending air and high pressure. According to the Köppen climate classification system, Niland has a hot desert climate, BWh on climate maps.

Climate data for Niland (130 feet below sea level)
Month	Jan	Feb	Mar	Apr	May	Jun	Jul	Aug	Sep	Oct	Nov	Dec	Year
Mean daily maximum °F (°C)	71 (22)	74 (23)	80 (27)	86 (30)	95 (35)	103 (39)	107 (42)	107 (42)	102 (39)	91 (33)	79 (26)	70 (21)	89 (32)
Daily mean °F (°C)	56 (13)	59 (15)	64.5 (18.1)	70 (21)	77.5 (25.3)	85 (29)	91 (33)	92 (33)	86 (30)	75 (24)	63.5 (17.5)	55 (13)	72.9 (22.7)
Mean daily minimum °F (°C)	41 (5)	44 (7)	49 (9)	54 (12)	60 (16)	67 (19)	75 (24)	77 (25)	70 (21)	59 (15)	48 (9)	40 (4)	57 (14)
Average precipitation inches (mm)	0.48 (12)	0.55 (14)	0.33 (8.4)	0.05 (1.3)	0.02 (0.51)	0.00 (0.00)	0.08 (2.0)	0.21 (5.3)	0.16 (4.1)	0.25 (6.4)	0.19 (4.8)	0.48 (12)	2.8 (70.81)
Source: Weather Channel

== See also ==
- Niland Geyser
- El Centro Metropolitan Area
- San Diego–Imperial, California
- Slab City, a camp near Niland in the Colorado Desert in southeastern California, used by recreational vehicle owners and squatters from across North America
