= Lake Cahuilla =

Prehistoric lake in the Salton Sea basin of California

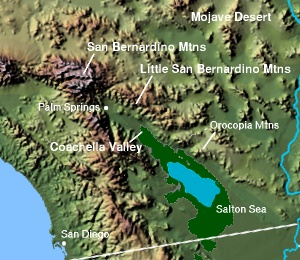
- Region of Lake Cahuilla; the dark green patch is the rough extent of Lake Cahuilla

- Location within California Location within the United States
- Location: Baja California, Mexico; California, United States
- Coordinates: 33°18′N 115°48′W
- Type: Prehistoric endorheic lake
- Part of: Salton Sink
- Primary inflows: Colorado River; San Felipe Creek; Whitewater River
- Primary outflows: Hardy River
- Max. length: 160 km (99 mi)
- Max. width: 56 km (35 mi)
- Surface area: 5,700 km^{2} (2,200 mi^{2})
- Average depth: 91 m (299 ft) at a surface elevation of 12 meters
- Surface elevation: 7.6–18.3 m (25–60 ft)
- Islands: 6

Lake Cahuilla (/kəˈwiː.ə/ kə-WEE-ə; also known as Lake LeConte and Blake Sea) was a prehistoric lake in California and northern Mexico. Located in the Coachella and Imperial valleys, it covered surface areas of 5,700 km^{2} (2,200 mi^{2}) to a height of 12 m (39 ft) above sea level during the Holocene. During earlier stages of the Pleistocene, the lake reached even higher elevations, up to 31–52 m (102–171 ft) above sea level. During the Holocene most of the water came from the Colorado River with little contribution from local runoff; in the Pleistocene local runoff was higher and it is possible that Lake Cahuilla was supported solely from local water sources during the Wisconsin glaciation. The lake overflowed close to Cerro Prieto into the Rio Hardy, eventually draining into the Gulf of California.

The lake formed several times during the Holocene, when water from the Colorado River was diverted into the Salton Trough. This tectonic depression forms the northern basin of the Gulf of California, but it was separated from the sea proper by the growth of the Colorado River Delta. Such changes in river courses may have been caused by earthquakes among the numerous faults that cross the region, such as the San Andreas Fault. Conversely, it is possible that the weight of the water itself triggered earthquakes. During its existence, Lake Cahuilla formed strandlines and various beach deposits such as gravel bars and travertine deposits.

The lake existed in several stages over the last 2,000 years, periodically drying and refilling and eventually disappearing sometime after 1580. Between 1905 and 1907, due to an engineering accident, the Salton Sea formed in parts of the lower basin of Lake Cahuilla. Were it not for human intervention, the sea might have grown to the size of prehistoric Lake Cahuilla. Today the former lake bed forms the fertile regions of the Imperial and Coachella Valleys.

The Algodones Dunes were formed from sand deposited by Lake Cahuilla, which was transported by wind toward the area. During its existence, the lake supported a rich biota with fish, bivalves and vegetation on its shorelines. These resources supported human populations on its shores, as evidenced by a number of archeological sites and mythological references to the lake in the traditions of the Cahuilla. The lake may have had profound effects on population genetics and language history of the surrounding regions.

== Name ==
The name "Lake Cahuilla" was used in 1907 by William Phipps Blake and is sometimes spelled "Coahuila". The lake is named after the Cahuilla, who refer to the lake in their oral tradition. A second name is "Blake Sea", after William Phipps Blake, who during one of the Pacific Railroad Surveys recognized the deposits of the former lake. According to their mythology, the Salton Trough was created by their deities Mukat and Témayawet to pool water.

The name "Lake LeConte" was coined in 1902 by Gilbert E. Bailey, and it is occasionally used to refer to the lake that existed during the Wisconsin glaciation or Pleistocene. In 1980, M.R. Waters applied the term to cover all lakes of Holocene age in the Salton Basin. This name is derived from Joseph LeConte, a geography professor.

Presently, the name "Lake Cahuilla" applies to the reservoir at the northern end of the Coachella Canal, in the Coachella Valley. "Lake Cahuilla" is also the name of a seismic station in California.

== Geography ==
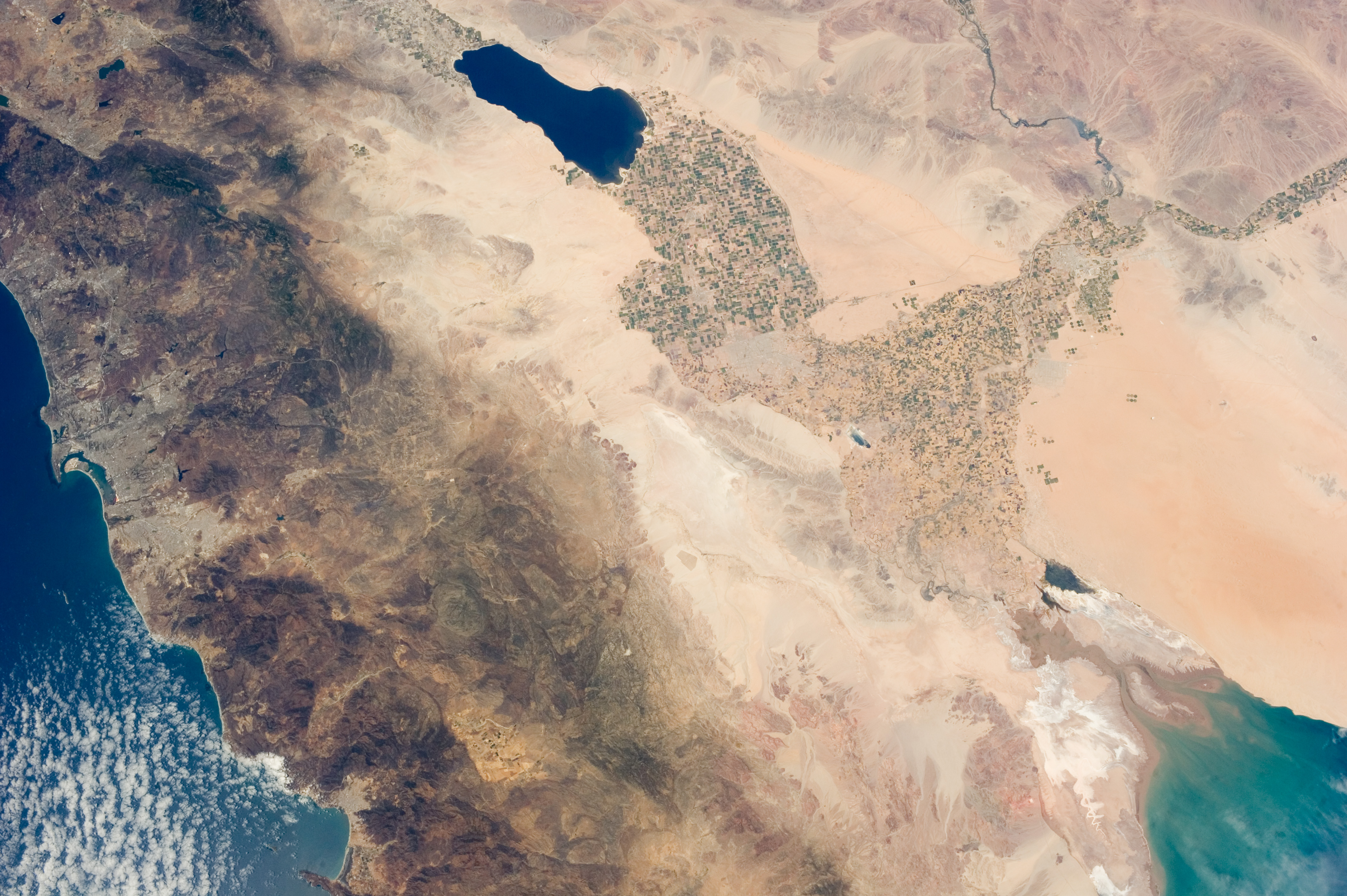
The Salton Trough and Colorado River Delta from space

Lake Cahuilla formed in the region of the present-day Salton Sea. It extended over the southern end of Coachella Valley in the north, through the Imperial Valley in the south, and down to the Cerro Prieto area in Baja California. The general area is also known as the Colorado Desert. Currently, 5,400 square kilometres (2,100 sq mi) of the land is below sea level. The Salton Trough extends 225 kilometres (140 mi) northwest and has a width of 110 kilometres (68 mi) at the border.

Towns in areas formerly covered by Lake Cahuilla include, from north to south, Indio, Thermal, Mecca, Mortmar, Niland, Calipatria, Brawley, Imperial and El Centro. Calexico and Mexicali may have been covered as well. To the southeast, the New River and the Alamo River now flow through the dry lakebed, while the Whitewater River and the San Felipe Creek enter from the northwest and southwest, respectively.

Major shorelines existed at 12 metres (39 ft) above North American Datum (NAD) and at 20–50 metres (66–164 ft) above NAD. With a southern shore south of the US-Mexico border, Lake Cahuilla had a length of 160 kilometres (100 mi), a maximum width of 56 kilometres (35 mi) and reached a depth of approximately 91 metres (300 ft) at a water elevation of 12 metres (39 ft). The maximum surface area was about 5,700 square kilometres (2,200 sq mi). The lake at maximum level held about 236 cubic kilometres (57 cu mi)-480 cubic kilometres (120 cu mi) of water. At maximum size, Lake Cahuilla was considerably larger than the Salton Sea and almost as large as the entire Salton Trough, and constituted one of the largest lakes of Holocene North America.

Bat Caves Butte and Obsidian Butte formed islands in the lake when it was full although during highstands the latter was submerged. Relatively straight northwest–southeast trending eastern shores faced from northwest to southeast the Indio Hills, the Mecca Hills, the Orocopia Mountains, the Chocolate Mountains and the East Mesa. The less regular western shore faced the Santa Rosa Mountains towards north and the Fish Creek Mountains and Vallecito Mountains farther south. Earlier lake stages may have extended into the Jacumba Mountains as well.

== Hydrology ==
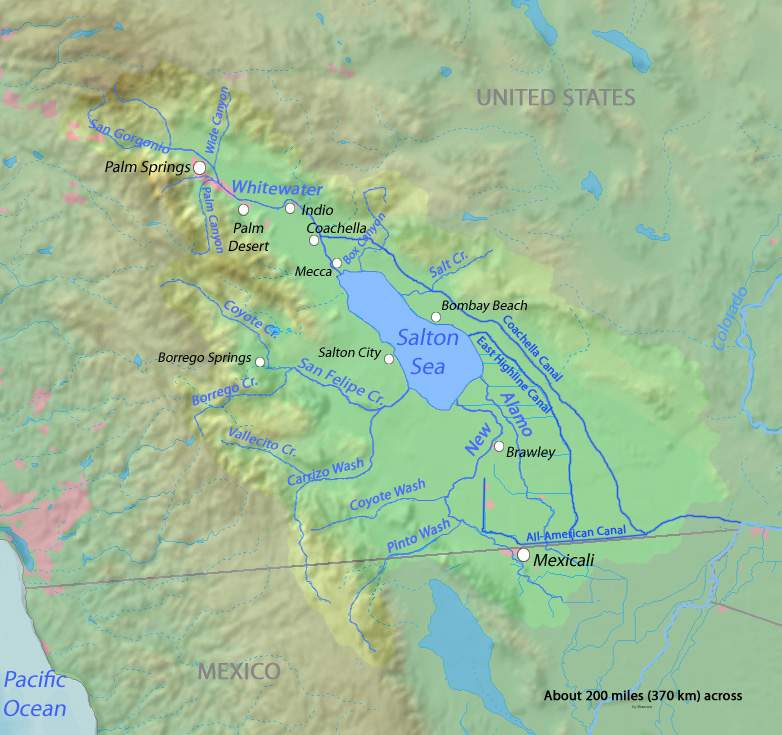
Present day drainage system of the Salton Sea

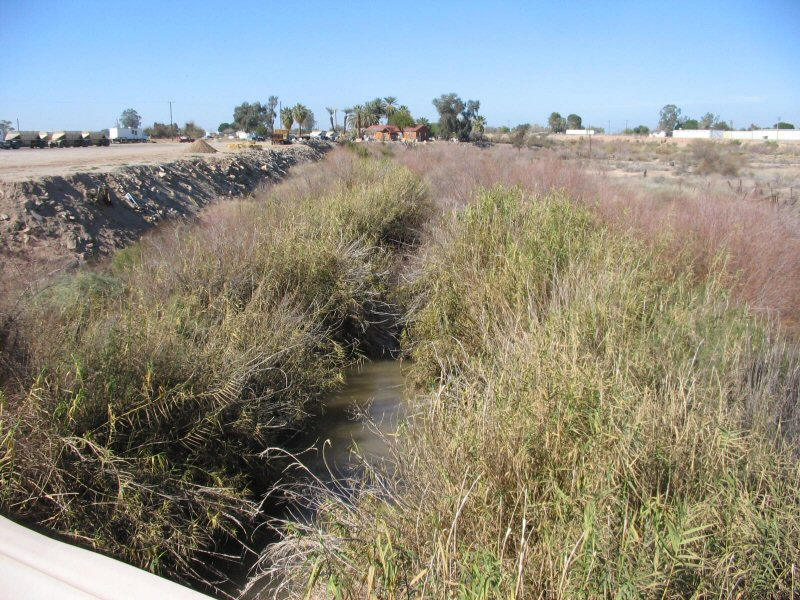
The present-day Alamo River

=== Inflow ===
Lake Cahuilla was formed by water from the Colorado River; groundwater and other inflows were negligible. Likewise, the precipitation (presently about 76 millimetres per year (3 in/year)) did not contribute much to the lake budget. The amount of water needed to sustain Lake Cahuilla at a level of 12 metres (39 ft) above sea level is possibly about half of the discharge of the Colorado River, and during times where the lake was filling nearly no water from the river would have reached the Gulf of California.

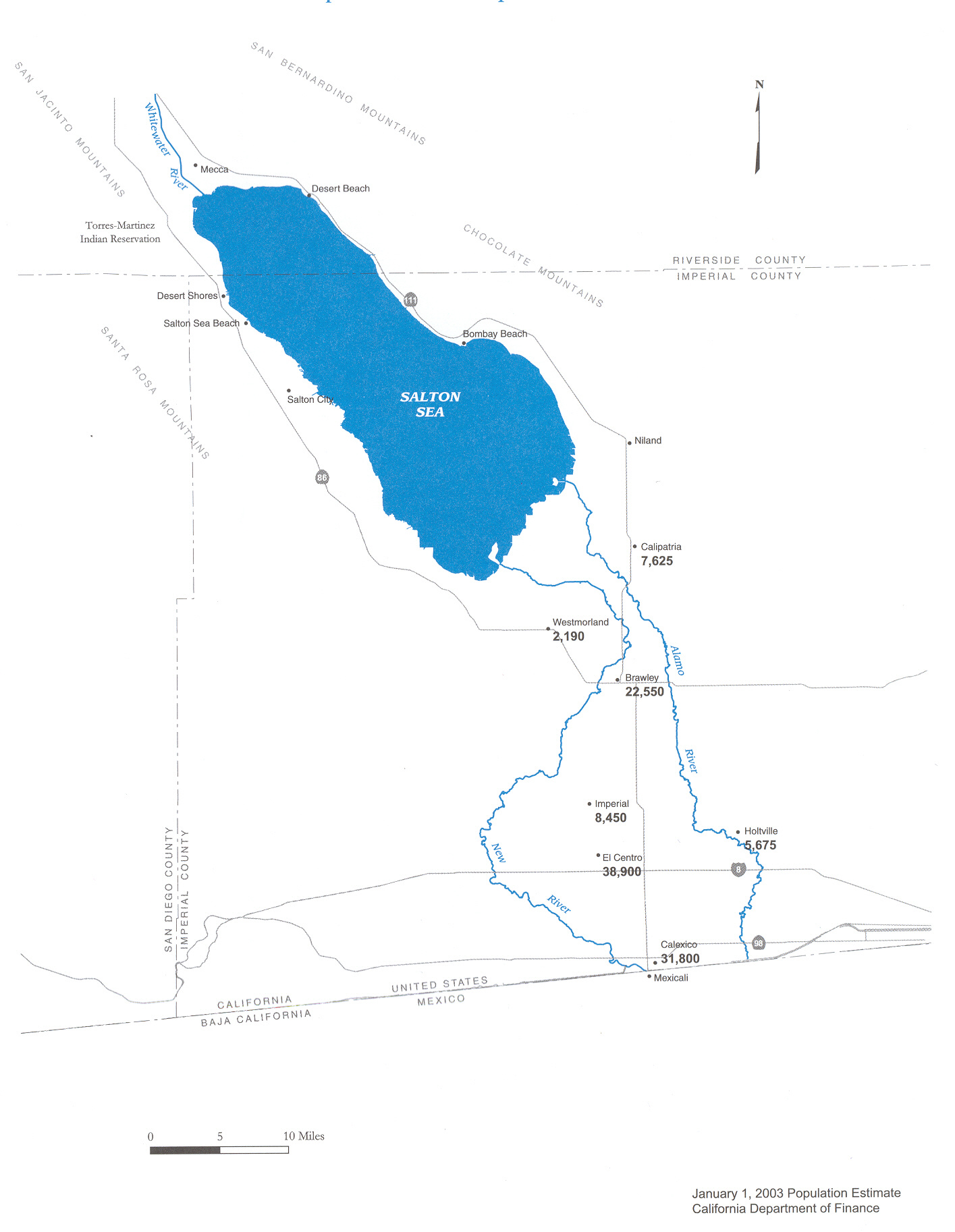
New River and Alamo River

Sedimentation of the Colorado River Delta directed water into the Lake Cahuilla area, a process that was more likely to happen during humid periods. Distributaries in a river delta are inherently unstable and tend to change course often. Major floods may have triggered the change in river course, although most of the flood events in the prehistoric record do not appear to be associated with diversions to Lake Cahuilla and one cannot conclude that the river course changes are more likely to occur during wet periods. Given that the slope toward Lake Cahuilla is steeper than the one toward the Gulf of California, once the river entered the basin it likely stabilized on that course. In fact, it is remarkable that this slope difference doesn't regularly cause the river to enter the Salton Trough. The diversions occurred close to the apex of the Colorado River Delta and would have discharged water directly through the Alamo River and indirectly through Volcano Lake and the New River into Lake Cahuilla. The infilling of the lake may have been a catastrophic flood, considering that native people fled the Imperial Valley to the mountains. Infilling to an altitude of 12 metres (39 ft) above sea level would have taken 12–20 years. When the lake was full, the Colorado River would have entered it at the southeastern side.

When the Colorado River drained into Lake Cahuilla, the entire sediment flow (c. 150,000,000 tonnes per year (4,800 kg/s)) of the river would have entered the lake; a sedimentation rate of 5 millimetres per year (0.20 in/year) has been inferred for the northern part of the lake while the Colorado River Delta shows evidence of reduced sedimentation while the river drained into Lake Cahuilla. Sedimentation of the inlet during highstands and resulting river course changes away from Lake Cahuilla would have resulted in the Colorado River changing its course back to the Gulf of California.

Other major streams that drained into Lake Cahuilla were Whitewater River from the north, and San Felipe Creek and Carrizo Creek from the southwest. More minor drainage came from Arroyo Salado on the western shore, and Salt Creek and Mammoth Wash on the eastern shore. Additional unnamed drainages did exist. Drainage from the Chocolate Mountains and the Cargo Muchacho Mountains may have reached the lake but are now buried by the Algodones Dunes. All these water systems are ephemeral.

Presently the only major streams entering the basin come from mountains to the west and northwest, as well as the New and Alamo Rivers, but during the Pleistocene they likely transported more water. When lower sea levels entrenched a more southerly course of the Colorado River, Lake Cahuilla may have been nourished solely by local runoff during the Wisconsin glaciation.

=== Shorelines ===
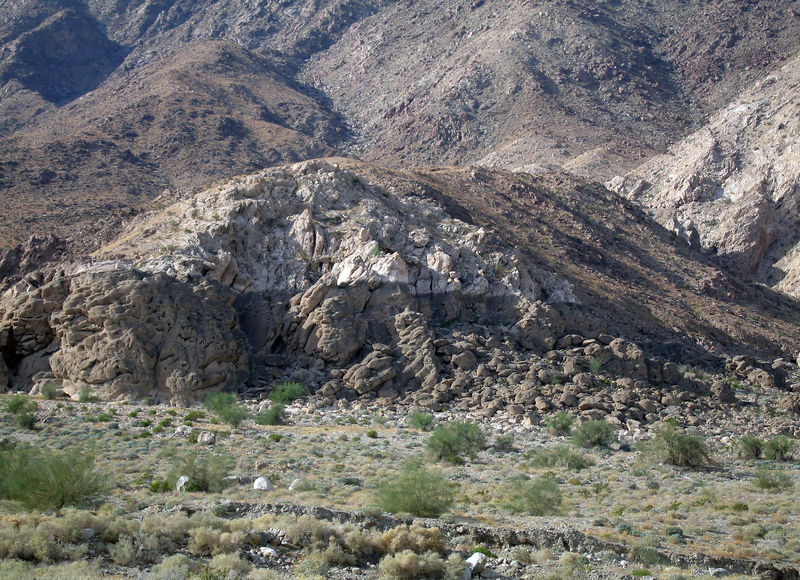
Shorelines at Santa Rosa Mountains, California

Shorelines lie at altitudes of 7.6–18.3 metres (25–60 ft) above sea level; the variation is probably caused by slumping, measurement problems, and different wave cut and beach deposit thicknesses. The most recent highstand lasted long enough to allow the formation of well developed shorelines. Fish fossils found off the coastline suggest that lagoons connected to the lake formed there. Fluctuations of the lake level caused the deposition of beach berms. Based on recessional shorelines with distances of slightly over 1.5 to 1.23 metres (4 ft 11 in to 4 ft 0 in) from each other, 96 metres (315 ft) of depth would have evaporated in about 70 years.

The shoreline is particularly visible at Travertine Point in the Santa Rosa Mountains, where the color contrast between the dark desert varnish above the shoreline and the travertine below is recognizable from US highway 99.

The nature of the shoreline varies; to the east it includes 7.6 metres (25 ft) high wavecut cliffs beneath the Mecca Hills over baymouth bars farther south, one of which reaches a length of 5.6 kilometres (3.5 mi) at the Orocopia Mountains. Even farther south shingle beaches are found, showing evidence of vigorous wave activity. At East Mesa, a c. 50 kilometres (31 mi) long barrier beach may have formed from sediments deposed by flash floods. Material eroded from the eastern and southwestern shores was deposited in the form of gravel and sand bars off the coast. As lake levels rose, at least one tributary stream had its valley filled in with Lake Cahuilla sediments. Tufas formed along shorelines, reaching maximum thicknesses of 1 metre (3 ft 3 in); they are found especially on the northwestern shores. At the Fish Creek Mountains, beaches made up of gravel and a travertine layer on the mountain front mark the shore.

=== Water composition ===
As deduced from the presence of freshwater molluscs, Lake Cahuilla was a freshwater lake during its highstand, while lower lake level stages show fossil evidence of increased salinity. Alternatively the lake may have been brackish. The salinity may have been lower where the Colorado entered the lake and higher farther north.

=== Water currents ===
High cliffs, sandbars and piles of pebbles testify to the existence of strong wave action on the northeastern shore, which was influenced by strong northwesterly winds. Inversely, the gentle southern slopes of the lake bed probably reduced wave action on the lake's southern shores.

Strong northwesterly winds likely created southbound lake currents on the eastern shores, forming beach structures from sediment imported from the north into the lake.

=== Outflow ===
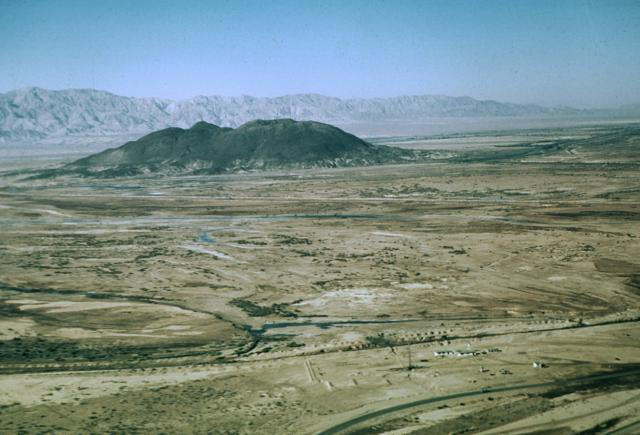
Cerro Prieto, the site of Lake Cahuilla's outlet

Only about half of the discharge of the Colorado River was needed to sustain Lake Cahuilla; the rest drained across the delta into the Gulf of California. A 12 metres (39 ft) above sea level the outflow sill close to Cerro Prieto formed the likely spillway for the lake. Other data points to a sill height of 10 ± 0.299 metres (32.81 ± 0.98 ft), but topographic maps of the area are not very precise. The present day sill is about 2 kilometres (1.2 mi) long, and Cerro Prieto lies on the drainage divide between the New River and Rio Hardy watersheds. Water reached the Gulf of California through the present day Rio Hardy channel. Oxygen-18 isotope data from tufas suggests that the lake was closed or mostly closed for much of its time, that the outflow did contribute little to the water balance; some water may also have been trapped in aquifers.

The present-day sill to the Gulf of California lies at an altitude of 9 metres (30 ft) above sea level; the sill was probably higher in the past given that the highest shorelines of Lake Cahuilla are 18 metres (59 ft) above sea level. During the Pleistocene, the sill was even higher and thus lake levels could reach higher elevations. A rejuvenation of the river triggered by decreasing sea levels or tectonic subsidence at Cerro Prieto caused the levels of the various lakes to progressively decrease. Dacitic lava flows from the Cerro Prieto volcano may have stabilized the overflow sill against erosion; it is otherwise difficult to explain why the fairly easily eroded sill material was stable against downcutting by overflow.

Once cut off from the Colorado River by changes in its course, Lake Cahuilla would have evaporated at a rate of 1.8 metres per year (71 in/year), eventually drying in 53 years. Data taken from fossil Mugil cephalus suggest that during the recession of the lake, the Colorado River still occasionally reached the lake.

== Climate ==
The present day climate of the Lake Cahuilla area is dry and hot during summer. Temperatures range from 10–35 °C (50–95 °F) with a high of 51 °C (124 °F). Precipitation amounts to 64 millimetres per year (2.5 in/year). The mountains west of the Cahuilla area are considerably wetter. Evaporation rates can reach 1,800 millimetres per year (71 in/year).

Winds on the lake probably occurred in two patterns, northwesterly winds with speeds of 50 kilometres per hour (31 mph) and more persistent westerly winds with speeds of 24 kilometres per hour (15 mph). These winds formed substantial waves in the lake and created longshore currents along the eastern shores of Lake Cahuilla.

Pleistocene climate is harder to determine, though it was probably not much wetter than today, except in the mountains where precipitation increased. Drainage changes in the Colorado River Delta probably account for most of the water budget increases responsible for the formation of Lake Cahuilla. In the Mojave Desert large lakes also formed during that time. In the early Holocene the North American Monsoon strongly influenced the local climate and then progressively weakened.

A colder climate introduced cold-limited animal species which appeared at lower altitudes, and glaciers formed on the San Bernardino Mountains. A probable southward shift of the storm belts led to windier weather. According to data obtained from tufa in Lake Cahuilla, a wet period ended 9,000 years before present, and between 6,200 and 3,000–2,000 years before present extended droughts occurred.

== Geology ==
Lake Cahuilla formed in a region where the Gulf of California tectonic zone meets the San Andreas Fault tectonic system. Volcanic activity and earthquakes occur as a consequence to this tectonic configuration. The San Andreas Fault runs roughly parallel to the northeastern margin of Lake Cahuilla, where it moved at a rate of 9–15 millimetres per year (0.35–0.59 in/year) over the last 45,000–50,000 years. Earthquakes are documented in sediments from Lake Cahuilla, but this southern segment has not ruptured in historical time. Tectonic extension occurs at the points where the fault forms stepovers, although the extensional structures are still relatively immature.

The Cahuilla Basin, also known as the Salton Sink, is part of the trough that is occupied by the Gulf of California. The basin structure is surrounded by various crystalline rocks that were formed from the Precambrian era forwards to the Tertiary period. About 10–16 kilometres (6.2–9.9 mi) of sediment fill the basin from the Miocene, testifying to rapid tectonic subsidence. Four million years ago, the Colorado River started to enter into the area, and the formation of the Colorado River Delta separated the Salton Trough during the Pleistocene from the Gulf of California; during the Pliocene the connection still existed. Another basin in the region is formed by the Laguna Salada, with yet smaller basins such as the Mesquite Basin also reported. Approximately 6 kilometres (3.7 mi) of sediment have accumulated in the Salton Trough, burying the underlying crust. Heat flow analysis suggests that active extension is underway in the trough.

=== Faults and earthquakes ===
When Lake Cahuilla existed, individual earthquakes caused as much as 1 metre (3 ft 3 in) displacement. Sediments of Lake Cahuilla have shown deformation structures similar to these formed by the 1971 San Fernando earthquake in the Van Norman Reservoir of the Los Angeles Aqueduct. These deformation structures were formed by soil liquefaction. Sediments of the lake Coachella have yielded evidence of eight earthquakes, dated to have occurred between 906 – 961, 1090 – 1152, 1275 – 1347, 1588 – 1662, and 1657 – 1713. Less certain is the timing of events between 959 – 1015 and 1320 – 1489.

Patterns of seismic activity detected by paleoseismology suggest that the filling of Lake Cahuilla might have triggered stress changes that caused earthquakes along the San Andreas Fault (where it might be responsible for most or even all earthquakes on the southern San Andreas Fault, although "outlier earthquakes" also took place.) and other faults when they were already close to rupture. Such lake-induced seismicity is known from reservoirs and referred to as induced seismicity, and might be caused by changes in pore pressure during lake filling. Alternatively, earthquakes could have caused course changes in the Colorado River that then caused the lake to flood or to dry up; paleoseismology in Coachella is consistent with this hypothesis. Some earthquakes such as the 1892 Laguna Salada earthquake caused large vertical displacements that could have triggered flooding. Conversely, tectonically driven uplift of the northern side of the Colorado River Delta tends to stabilize the present southward course of the river against diversions to the north.

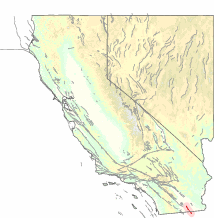
The Imperial Fault

The San Andreas Fault has offset Indian stone rings, its path is buried by sediments from Lake Cahuilla. During the Pleistocene, this fault was relatively inactive compared to the Imperial Fault and the San Jacinto Fault. Other faults that crossed the shores of Lake Cahuilla are:

- The Extra fault zone, which divides a northern more stable basin from a southern basin that underwent tectonic extension and slightly slower sedimentation.
- The Coyote Creek Fault, whose movement rate has been estimated from displacement of Lake Cahuilla sediments and probably accelerated during the time of Cahuilla's highstand.
- The Superstition Mountain Fault which extends from the Coyote Creek fault.
- The San Jacinto Fault which runs parallel to part of Cahuilla's western shore, was last active in 820–1280, 1280, 1440–1637 and 1440–1640 and whose fault trace could be buried beneath sediments from Lake Cahuilla.
- The Elmore Ranch fault which displays evidence of after-lake activity in the Superstition Hills.

Faults on the lake floor include the Brawley Seismic Zone, potentially the Cerro Prieto Fault, the Imperial Fault, and the Kane Springs Faults. The Imperial Fault may have ruptured together with a rupture of the San Andreas Fault during a highstand of Lake Cahuilla, and was last active during the 1940 Imperial Valley earthquake.

=== Volcanoes ===
Several volcanoes existed on the floor of Lake Cahuilla and are now emergent at the southeastern margin of the Salton Sea, including the Cerro Prieto and the Salton Buttes. Cerro Prieto is formed by two c. 200 metres (660 ft) high lava domes that coalesce into a volume of about 0.6 cubic kilometres (0.14 cu mi) and a 200 metres (660 ft) wide crater on the northeastern dome. In addition, mud pots and mud volcanoes exist on the floor of the Cahuilla Basin. Geothermal energy is obtained in some parts of the region. The presence of volcanism may have been facilitated by extensional faults, which would have provided pathways for magma ascent.

The Salton Buttes are five lava domes that form a 7 kilometres (4.3 mi) long chain; each dome is less than 1 kilometre (0.62 mi) wide. They are formed by rhyolite, which contains xenoliths. These domes are known as Mullet Hill, Obsidian Butte, Red Island and Rock Hill. Obsidian Butte originally formed subaerially but tufas and wavecut forms show that Lake Cahuilla submerged the dome. Red Island erupted within Lake Cahuilla, forming pyroclastic flow deposits. Wave action removed pumice and probably formed beach bars from this volcano. Pumice rafts are found emplaced on local shorelines.

Potassium-argon dating has yielded ages of 16,000 years ago for the Salton Buttes, later superseded by an age estimate of 33,000 ± 35,000 years ago and finally with a date of 2,480 ± 470 years before present on the basis of uranium-thorium dating. Despite these old ages, some of them still release steam. Cerro Prieto appears to be 108,000 ± 46,000 years old based on potassium-argon dating, but legends of native Cucupah people may indicate Holocene activity.

Obsidian from Obsidian Butte has been found as far as 500 kilometres (310 mi) away. It started being used between 510 BC-640 AD, which led to the theory that the Obsidian Butte could only be used as a source of obsidian once it was no longer covered by Lake Cahuilla. Obsidian Butte was underwater during the highstands, but at lower water levels it would have formed an island in Lake Cahuilla. During the late historical period it was a source of obsidian for southernmost California.

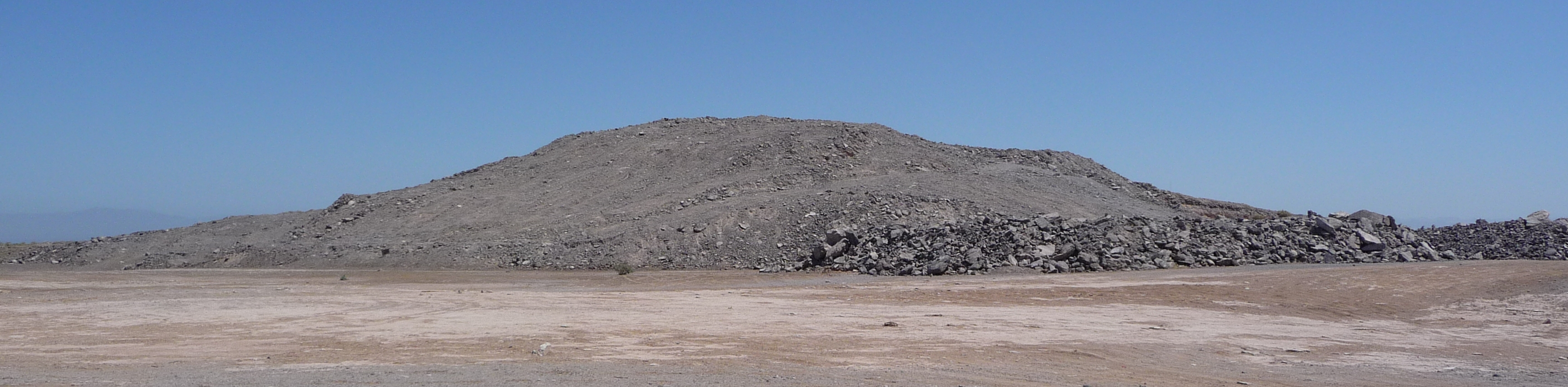
Obsidian Butte

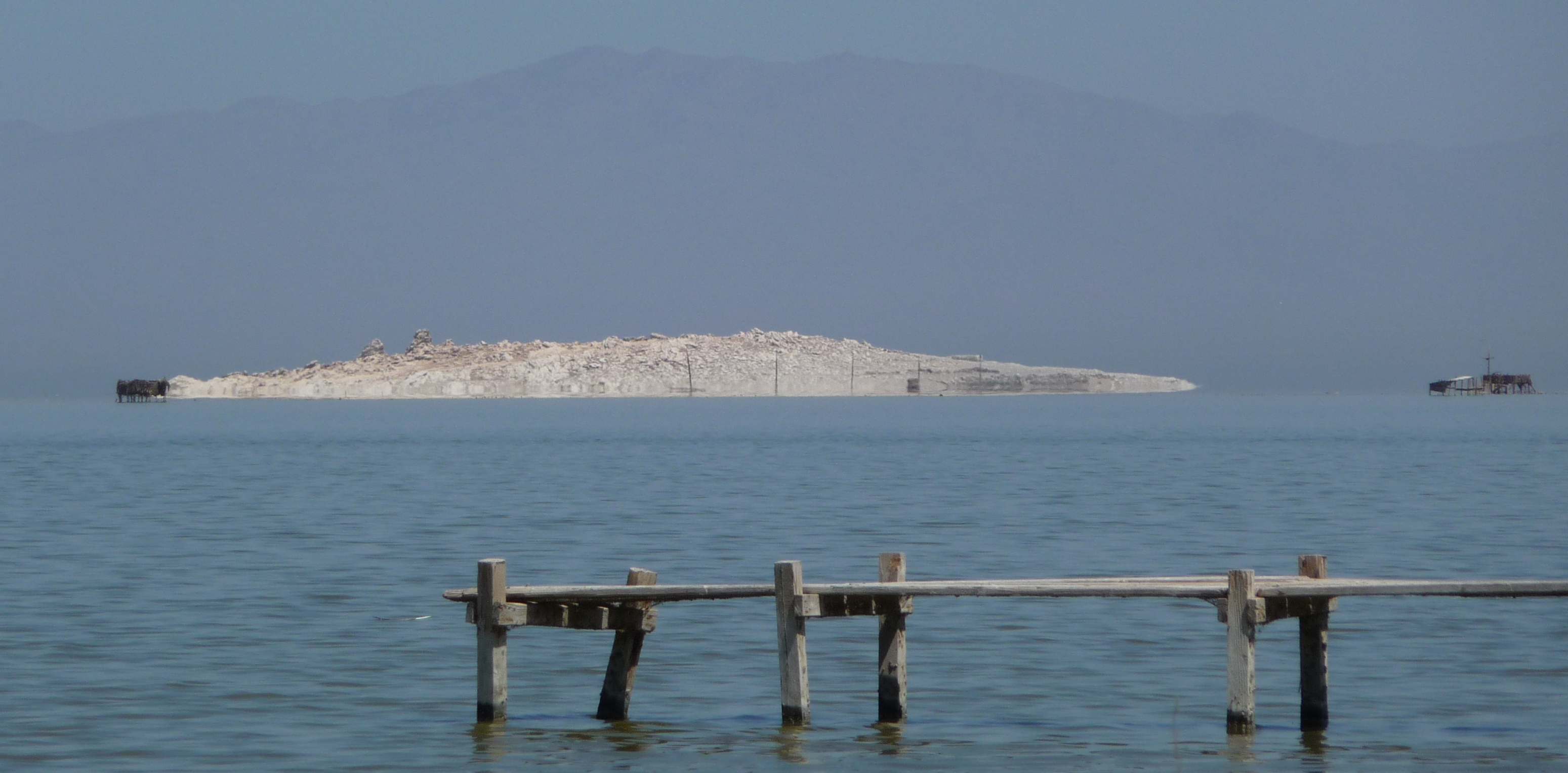
Mullet Island

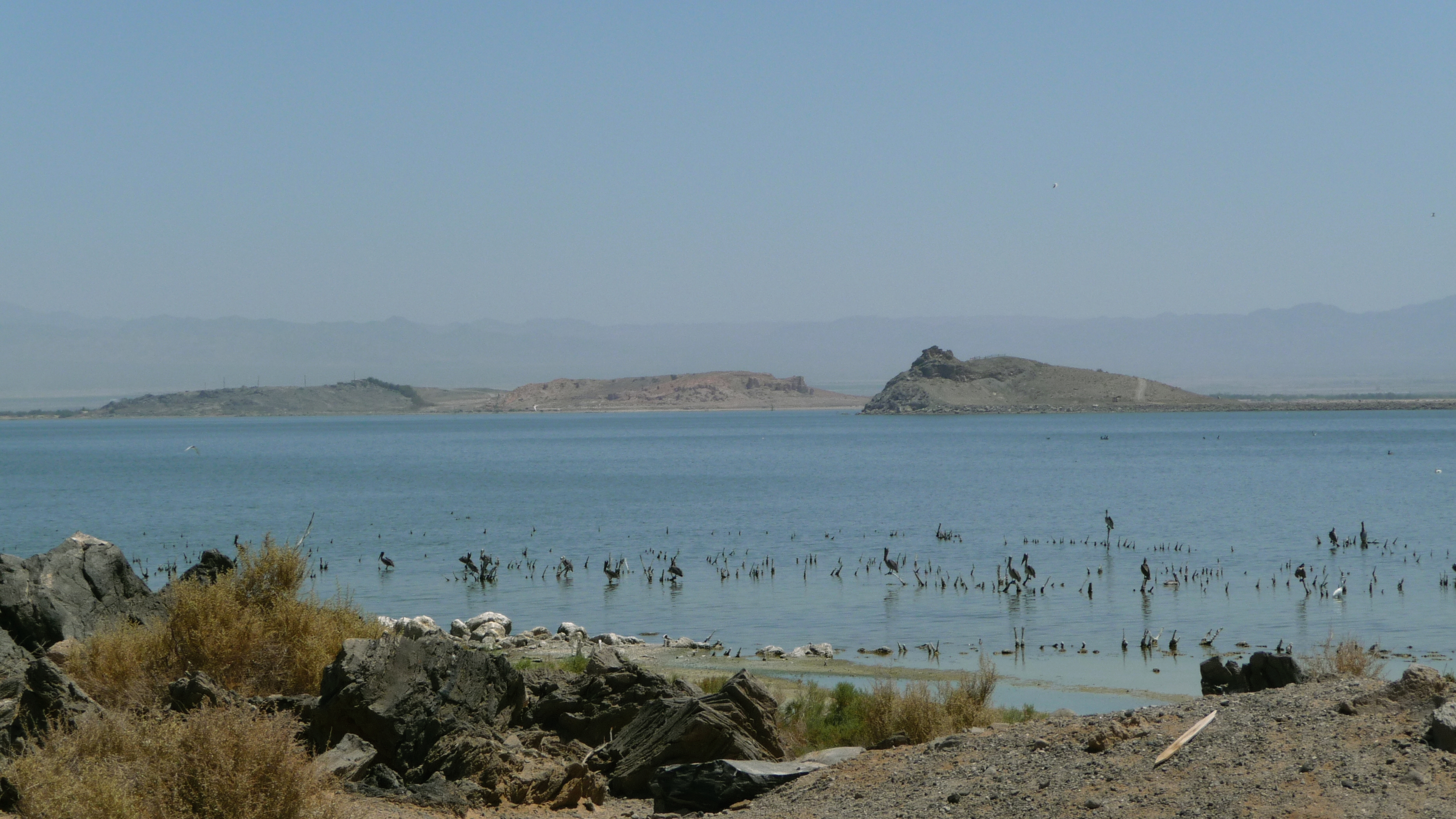
Red Island and Rock Hill

== Biology ==
Bivalves occurred at the shores of Lake Cahuilla, including Anodonta californiensis and possibly Pisidium casertanum. Anodonta shells are sometimes found within their own tunnels. They were probably used by inhabitants as a food source or to make shell beads. Gastropods identified include Amnicola longinqua, Gyraulus parvus, Helisoma trivolvis, Physella ampullacea, Physella humerosa and Tryonia protea. These taxa were relatively abundant at the shores of the lake and formed distinct populations with different appearances. Ostracods include Cypridopsis vidua, Cyprinotus torosa and Limnocythere ceriotuberosa. Sponges have been identified in fossil deposits as well. One mammal found in the lake was the muskrat, Ondatra zibethicus.

The lake formed an oasis in the desert. The shores of Lake Cahuilla developed arrowweed, tules and willowweed, with mesquite at distance to the shoreline and microbial mats underwater. Land plants identified in Lake Cahuilla sediments include evening primroses, pine, Polypodiaceae, ragweed, saltbushes, Selaginella sinuites and sunflower. Many of these are represented by pollen. The Pleistocene lake and adjacent lagoons featured charophytes of the genus Chara.

The bird species that populated Lake Cahuilla resembled these around the present-day Salton Sea and may have contained species from the Gulf of California as well. They include Aechmophorus grebes, American coot, American white pelican, Anas and Aythya ducks, black-crowned night heron, eared grebes, pied-billed grebes and most likely shorebirds. The lake was an important stopover on the Pacific flyway.

Fish species that have been identified as having lived in Lake Cahuilla include Catostomus latipinnis, Cyprinodon macularius, Elops affinis, Gila elegans, Gila cypha, Gila robusta, Mugil cephalus, Poeciliopsis occidentalis, Ptychocheilus lucius, and Xyrauchen texanus. Lake Cahuilla featured similar fish species as the lower Colorado River.

Diatom species identified in sediments left by Lake Cahuilla include Cocconeis placentula, Epithermia argus, Epithermia turgida, Mastogloia elliptica, Navicula palpebralis, Pinnularia viridis, Rhopalodia gibba, Surirella striatula, Terpsinoe musica and Tetracyclus lacustris. Other species whose identification is less clear are Campylodiscus clypeus, Cyclotella kuetzingiana, Hantzschia taenia, Navicula clementis, Navicula ergadensis, Nitzschia etchegoinia, Nitzschia granulata and Synedra ulna.

During periods when the level in the lake rose, vegetation in the flooded areas drowned and the organic material coming from it was washed ashore and later buried in coastal sediments. Five fish species and waterfowl populated the lake, and evidence exists of marshes on its shore. The flora and fauna along the seashores was probably robust enough to tolerate lake level drops for a while before increased salinity resulted in their disappearance.

== History ==
=== Chronology ===
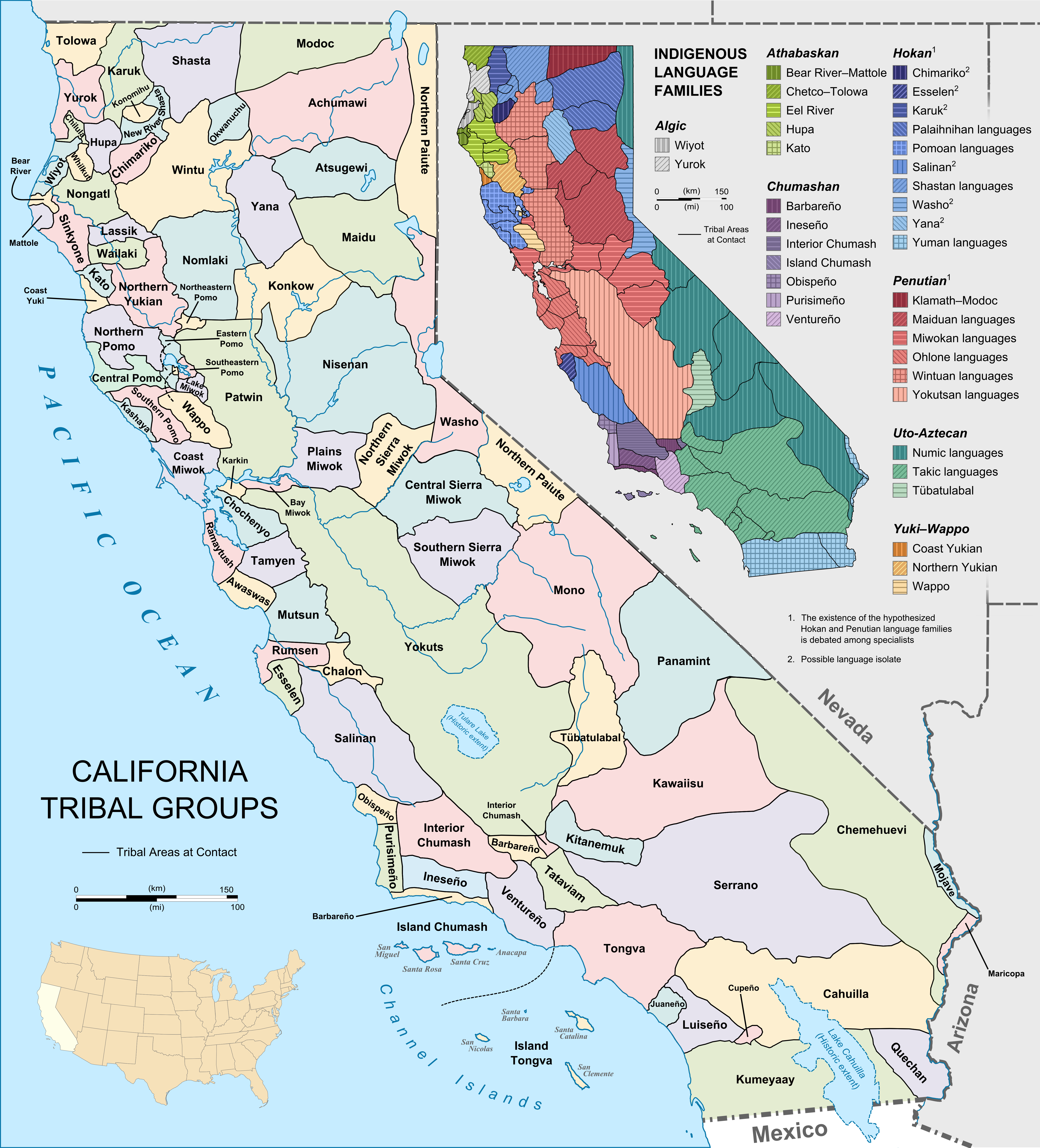
Map of the indigenous tribes of California at contact showing the maximum historic extent of Lake Cahuilla

The history of Lake Cahuilla spans the late Pleistocene and the Holocene, with maximum lake extents occurring starting from 40,000 years ago. Pleistocene shorelines are found mainly on the western side at altitudes of 31–52 metres (102–171 ft); an early 49–46 metres (161–151 ft) high shoreline was dated at 37,400 ± 2,000 years before present. At Travertine Point, evidence of a lake going back to 13,000 ± 200 years ago has been found. According to dates obtained from tufas, between 20,350 and 1,300 years before present water levels were always more than −24 metres (−79 ft) above sea level. In the northeastern section of the lake, Pleistocene shorelines lie close to the path of the Coachella Canal. Pleistocene water levels are generally higher than the Holocene ones which did not exceed 12 metres (39 ft) above sea level, probably due to erosion in the Colorado River delta.

The latest highstand of Cahuilla was 400–550 years before present. Water levels of 12 metres (39 ft) above sea level occurred between 200 BC and 1580. The well preserved shorelines, lack of desert pavements and desert varnish on shore features, and a relative lack of soil and archeological evidence suggest that Lake Cahuilla reached its maximum in the late Holocene.

It was assumed at first that the lake existed in a single long interval between 1000 and 1500; however, later a succession of wet and dry phases was determined from radiocarbon dating. Each phase was stable for prolonged times. Most commonly, the occurrence of five separate lake stages and six highstands is assumed. One theory assumes four highstands between 695 and 1580. One chronology assumes these highstands occurred 100 BC – 600 AD, 900–1250 and 1300–1500. Six or five different cycles are documented in Coachella. At Superstition Hills five lake cycles from 817 to 964, 1290–1330, 1440–1640, 1480–1660, 1638–1689 and 1675–1687 are documented; the 1440–1640 cycle may have consisted of four sub-cycles that occurred within short time distances from each other or may be part of a cycle centered at 1577 ± 67. An older highstand was observed at East Mesa and dated to 3,850 years before present. At least 12 different cycles of lake growth and lake shrinkage occurred over the last 2,000 – 3,000 years. Radiocarbon dates of the highstands range 300 ± 100 to 1,580 ± 200 before present. A recent theory envisages several lake cycles at 1731-1733 AD (Lake A), 1618-1636 AD (Lake B), 1486-1503 AD (Lake C), 1118-1165 or 1192-1241 AD (Lake D), 1007-1070 AD (Lake E), 930-966 AD (Lake F), and 612 AD-5 BC (Lake G). The basin was probably not entirely dry between the last three highstands.

Some legends of the Kami and Cahuilla tribes probably refer to Lake Cahuilla and its latest filling. They state that the lake bed tended to be dry but also occasionally flooded; during which times the tribes would have to relocate to the mountains. Evidence for the lake's existence in the historical record, however, is unclear, although it probably still existed at the time when the Spaniards reached the region.

The occurrence of a highstand ("Lake A") around 1726 ± CE is secure. It is not clear whether Lake Cahuilla was full in 1540, the year in which the Coronado expedition took place, although some transverses in the reports about the Coronado expedition have been interpreted as to imply that it was not. It is possible that at that time, the Colorado River was draining into both the Gulf of California and Lake Cahuilla. Juan de Oñate in 1605 and Eusebio Kino in 1702 report that natives told them of the existence of a lake. Likewise a map by John Rocque c. 1762 shows the Colorado River draining into a lake. Williams Blake in 1853 reported of a Cahuilla legend that had a lake extending "from mountain to mountain" and evaporating "little by little", interrupted by a flood without warning. Based on observations made by Juan Bautista de Anza during his 1774 trip through the region, Lake Cahuilla did not exist by that point. It is still possible that a short refilling occurred between 1680 and 1825.

Some anomalously old radiocarbon dates of Lake Cahuilla deposits may be the consequence of the Colorado River transporting ancient carbonates into the lake. In addition, discrepancies between shell and other organic material ages can reach 400–800 years owing to old carbon; shells can also absorb carbon-14 from the air. Other research has documented no substantial old carbon effects.

It is likely that ephemeral lakes formed in the Lake Cahuilla basin during floods of the Colorado River, such as in 1828, 1840, 1849, 1852, 1862, 1867, and 1891. In 1873, Joseph Widney proposed to recreate the whole sea in the hope of increasing precipitation over southern California and thus to enhance agricultural productivity; this was known as the "Widney Sea". Since 1905–1907, a new lake exists where Lake Cahuilla once stood, the Salton Sea. This lake formed when heavier than average spring melt runoff in the Colorado River breached an irrigation canal. The Salton Sea might have grown to the size of Lake Cahuilla if human efforts had not stopped the flood.

=== Research history ===
In 1853, William Phipps Blake suggested that the Colorado River Delta cut off the basin from the sea and formed a playa; later two freshwater stages and one marine stage were identified in the basin. One year later he reported the existence of the 12 metres (39 ft) shoreline. Sykes in 1914 postulated that between 1706 and 1760 the Colorado River flooded the Lake Cahuilla basin, but there is no historical evidence for this. E.E.Free in 1914, estimated the existence of only one lake cycle, on the basis of a wavecut terrace. Hubbs and Miller (1948) assumed two freshwater stages.

Originally it was believed that Lake Cahuilla formed around 900 AD and existed until 1500 but with fluctuations as the Colorado River changed its course. In 1978, Philip J. Wilke proposed that two highstands occurred, one between 900 and 1250 and another between 1300 and 1500. Another proposal by Waters in 1983 suggested highstands 700–900, 940–1210 and after 1250, the latter with some brief recessions to lower lake levels. Both proposals were criticized on the grounds that they came to definite conclusions with insufficient information.

Malcolm J. Rogers suggested that early highstands of Lake Cahuilla had strong effects on the spread of ceramics in the region of California and Baja California, though this is considered untenable today.

== Products and significance ==
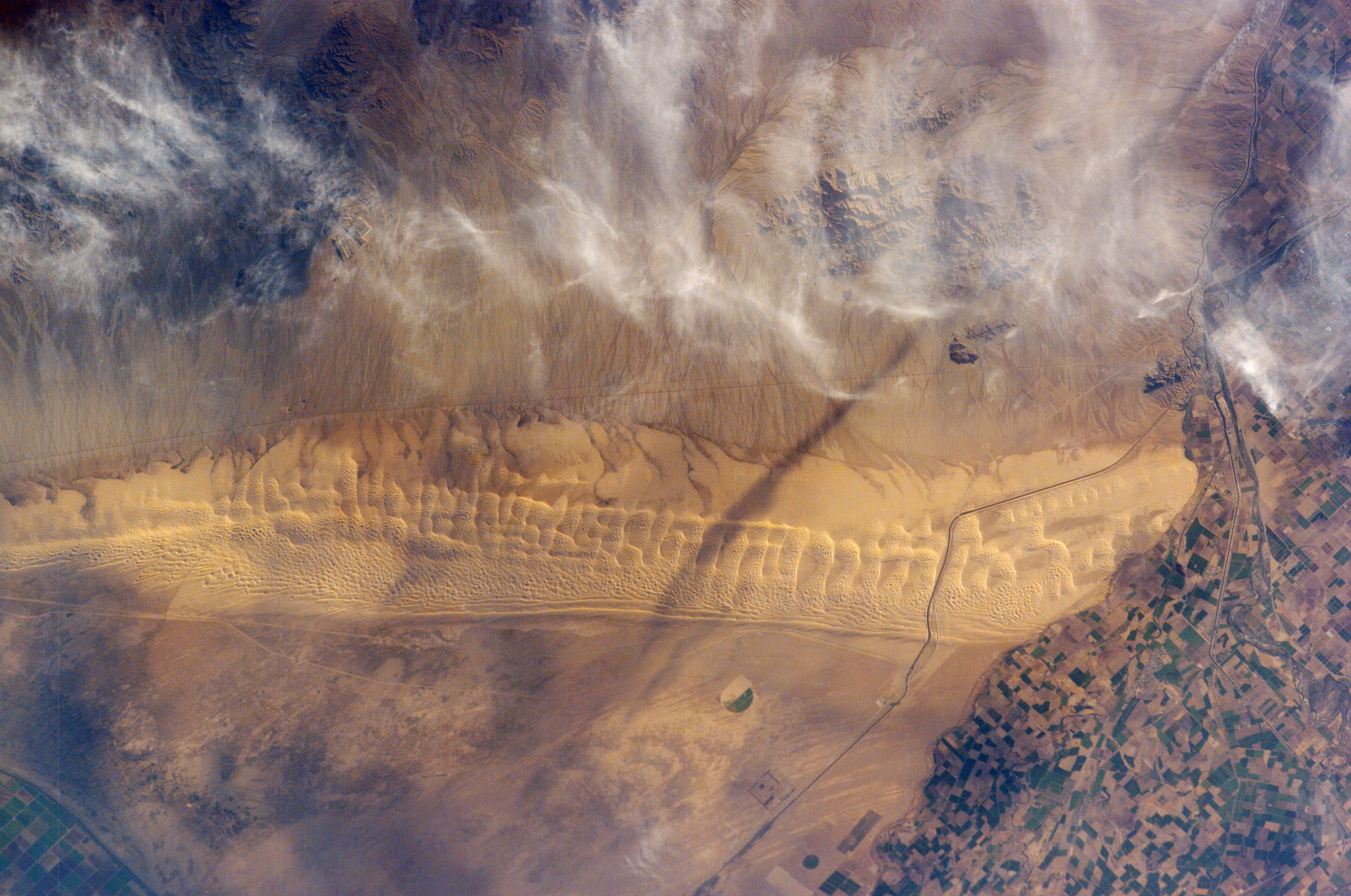
The Algodones dunes from space. Lake Cahuilla covered the bottom left part of the image

The Algodones Dunes, which border old Cahuilla shorelines, were formed by sand blown from Lake Cahuilla. This theory was first formulated in 1923. The process occurred either immediately after the lake reached modern highstands, or during earlier higher stands. Most likely, sand was transported to the dune field during times where the lake receded and its bed was exposed to wind. Various stages of Lake Cahuilla may correspond to waves of migrating dunes.

At first the Whitewater River and local washes were considered the primary source of these sands, which would have been transported to the Algodones area by longshore drift. This would imply a minimum age of 160,000 years. Later the Colorado River was identified as the main source of these sediments, but still potentially with some contribution from local drainages. At prevailing winds, most of the sediments from the Colorado would have been transported to the Cerro Prieto area and possibly carried by wind to the Gran Desierto de Altar.

Clay and fine silt, dominated by lutite, were deposited in the lake. Closer to the shore, sand was also emplaced. Deltaic deposits have been found as well. Minerals identified include biotite, chlorite, illite, kaolinite, montmorillonite and muscovite, with varying colors depending on the origin of the sediments. The material deposited by Lake Cahuilla is also known as the Cahuilla formation. The Miocene-Pliocene Imperial Formations, the Pliocene-Pleistocene Palm Springs Formations, and the Borrego and Brawley formations may also be linked to Lake Cahuilla or another precursor lake. These lacustrine materials bury the northern part of the Colorado River Delta, and they give the ground a grayish color. The clays left by the lake were used for the production of ceramic by the inhabitants of the region; likewise Lake Cahuilla is responsible for the fertile soils of the Coachella Valley and Imperial Valley, an important agricultural province of the United States. Halite deposits left by the lake were mined in the 19–20th century.

The weight of the water in Lake Cahuilla caused the surface beneath the lake to sink by about 0.4 metres (1 ft 4 in). Such ground depression has been observed at the ancient lakes Lake Bonneville, Lake Lahontan, Lake Minchin, and the modern reservoirs of Lake Mead, Three Gorges Reservoir in China, and La Grande in Quebec.

The genus Cahuillus of helminthoglyptid land snails is named after the lake. It contains the species Cahuillus indioensis with two subspecies indioensis and cathedralis, Cahuillus greggi and Cahuillus mexicanus.

== Archaeology ==
Cahuilla and Kumeyaay tribes

Numerous archeological sites of the Cahuilla have been found on the shores of the lake, including a number of campsites. On the northwest shore of Lake Cahuilla, remains of fish, shell middens and fishing weirs have been identified, indicating that early inhabitants of the region had relationships with Lake Cahuilla. Likewise, its recession probably influenced the local inhabitants. Patayan pottery and stone artifacts are among the archeological finds made at the Lake Cahuilla highstand shoreline, along with petroglyphs in the travertine. Four onshore campsites have been found at Bat Caves Butte, Myoma Dunes, Travertine Rock and Wadi Beadmaker.

Fish traps are commonly observed along the shorelines although they are also poorly researched and difficult to discern. About 650 fish weirs were found at the lake shores. They were probably built on an annual basis. This "industry" declined as waters receded, probably because of declining numbers of fish in the shrinking lake. Middens suggest that the lake was also a source of birds for local people.

Based on research on findings made there, the lake supported a substantial population that relied mostly on resources from the lake, including aquaculture and fishing. Estimated populations range from 20,000 to 100,000 people. When the lake dried up, the inhabitants switched to other economic activities. Agriculture did not play a major role in food supply.

The Elmore Site, discovered in 1990 during an archeological survey that accompanied work to improve State Route 86, lies close to the southwestern coast of Lake Cahuilla, about 67 metres (220 ft) beneath the highstand level. Archeological features found there include bones (mostly of birds), ceramics, charcoal from fires, pits from wood posts or storage pits, sandstone slabs, and shells of mostly marine origin. This archeological site was active after the waters of Lake Cahuilla had receded from the site, probably for a short time 1660–1680 AD.

It is likely that the repeated fillings and dryings had substantial effects on the communities around the lake. The relatively large size of Lake Cahuilla also meant that widespread "international" communities were affected by the lake. Indeed, evidence indicates that at least three different ethnic groups – Cahuilla, Kumeyaay and Cucapa – existed around the later history of the lake in its area. The effects of the lake's expansion most likely were dominantly positive on the communities concerned, unlike in the Colorado River Delta which lost part of its water supply. The distribution of the languages in the region may reflect the effects of fluctuations of Lake Cahuilla; population shifts caused by the drying and flooding of Lake Cahuilla may have favored exchanges between the Tepiman and River Yuman languages and the propagation of B2a mitochondrial haplogroups in the native people.

When Lake Cahuilla filled, it may have encouraged Quechan people to migrate to the area. This migration is considered to be a possible source for the spread of agriculture to the Peninsular Ranges. When Lake Cahuilla dried out after 1500 AD, these people would have migrated back south and west, a move possibly recorded in the oral traditions of the Quechan people and of people they mixed with. Legends have it that lost ships, sometimes described as pirate ships or galleons, sailed Lake Cahuilla and are now buried somewhere in the Colorado Desert.

== See also ==
- Laguna Salada - large seasonal lake near Lake Cahuilla
- Tulare Lake - large seasonal lake in the Central Valley of California
- Lake Cahuilla - a reservoir located in the Coachella Valley named after the prehistoric lake.
