= Patrick Halpen =

Irish engraver (1750–1790)

- Born: Ireland
- Known for: engraver

Patrick or Patt Halpen or Halpin (fl. 1750–1790) was an Irish engraver who is believed to have been the only line engraver in Dublin during his career.

== Life ==
Title page, Poems Ascribed to Robert Burns with portrait possibly by Halpen

Patrick Halpen was trained at the Dublin Society's School. In 1760, he was awarded a prize of 2 guineas for his engraving "Head of Mossop" and again for "an engraving in imitation of a chalk drawing" in 1763. He resided in Blackamoor Yard, off Anglesea Street, later moving to 35 Temple Bar in 1775.

Halpen worked in Dublin, and was principally engaged in engraving frontispieces and vignettes for booksellers there. He executed John Rocque's Survey of Dublin in Parishes, 1757 reducing it size to one sheet, and then to a smaller "pocket plan". Other works include the geometrical elevation of the parliament house, 1767 after Bernard Scalé, and also engraved a portrait of Dr. Charles Lucas, after Thomas Hickey published under subscription. The first Irish edition of Robert Burns' "Poems" published by James Magee in Belfast, carried a portrait of Burns by Halpen as its frontispiece.

He is believed to be the only line-engraver in Dublin during his career. His date of death is not known. With his wife Eleanor, he had a son, John Edmund Halpen or Halpin, studied to be a miniature painter, but was also an unsuccessful actor.
