= Patrick Halpin =

Patrick Halpin may refer to:

- Patrick G. Halpin, County Executive of Suffolk County, New York
- Patrick Halpin (engraver)
