= Lake Cahuilla (reservoir) =

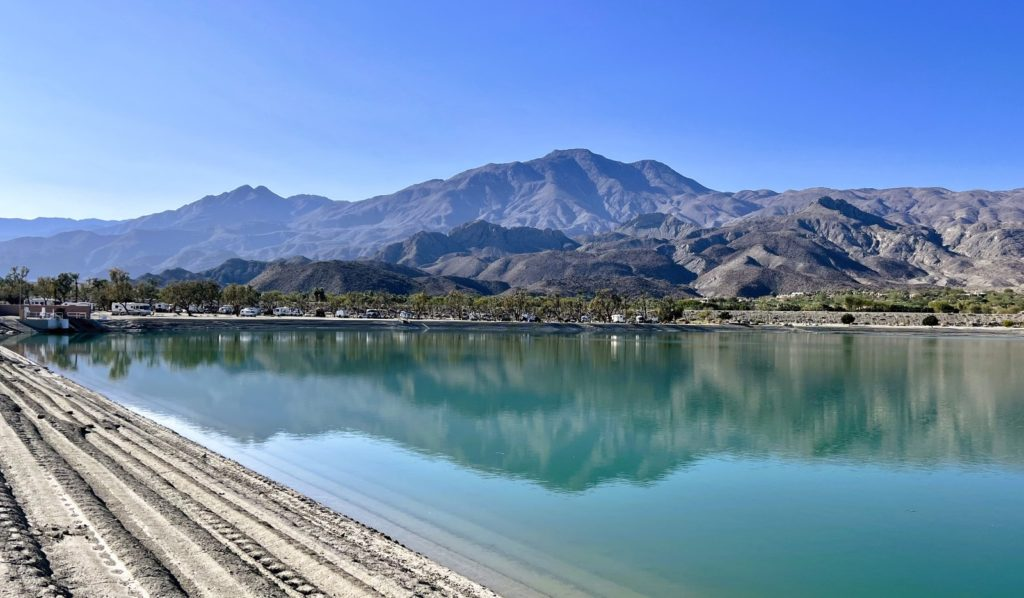
- Lake Cahuilla in the Coachella Valley

- Location within California Location within the United States
- Location: Coachella Valley; Riverside County, California
- Coordinates: 33°37′59″N 116°16′30″W
- Lake type: reservoir
- Primary inflows: Coachella Canal
- Basin countries: United States
- Surface area: 135 acres (55 ha)
- Average depth: 10 ft (0 m)
- Water volume: 1,300 acre-feet (1,600,000 m^{3})

Lake Cahuilla is a reservoir located in Southern California's Coachella Valley in Riverside County, California, with a capacity of 1,300 acre-feet (1,600,000 m^{3}) of water. The lake got its name from Ancient Lake Cahuilla that once covered surface areas of 5,700 km^{2} (2,200 sq mi) to a height of 12 m (39 ft) above sea level during the Holocene.

== See also ==
- Lake Cahuilla
- List of lakes of California
- List of lakes of the Colorado Desert
