= Mary Ann Rocque =

Cartographer

- Born: Mary Ann Scalé c. 1725; England
- Died: May 1774
- Other names: Mary Ann Scalé, M. A. Rocque, Mary Ann Bew, Ann Bew
- Years active: 1740s-1760s
- Spouse: John Rocque

Mary Ann Rocque, born Mary Ann Scalé, (c. 1725 - May 1774) was an English cartographer. Her booklet titled A Set of Plans and Forts of America (1765) included two of the earliest published maps of the city of Albany, New York and also celebrated British victories over the French in North America.

== Family ==
Mary Ann Scalé was born in England, the daughter of Bernard Scalé (who died in 1743) and niece of Peter Scalé. She was the older sister of Dublin-based surveyor and cartographer Peter Bernard Scalé. Rocque married apothecary Edward Bew sometime before 1743. In 1751 she married cartographer John Rocque, her brother's mentor, who held the titles "Chorographer to the Prince of Wales" and "Topographer to His Royal Highness the Duke of Glouchester". John Rocque died in 1762.

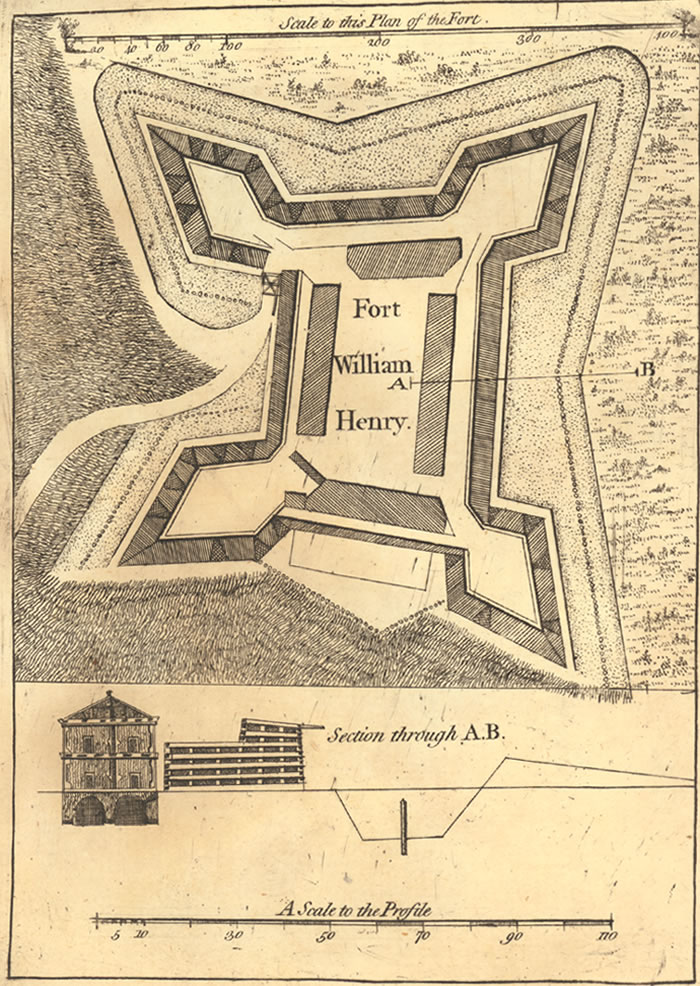
"Fort William Henry" in Mary Ann Rocque's A Set of Plans and Forts of America (1765), now at the Massachusetts Historical Society.

The Scalé and Rocque families were Huguenots. Another French cartographer in London, Louis Stanislaus de la Rochette, was married to her sister, Margaret.

== Career ==
In widowhood, Mary Ann Rocque took over her husband's Topographer title and carried on the family business in the Strand, going into partnership with Andrew Dury. In 1762, Rocque published her late husband's A survey of the County of Surrey, the first large-scale survey of the English county of Surrey.

Not content to maintain her late husband's business, Rocque published new and significant maps after his death. In 1763, she published a new edition of her husband's The Environs of London Reduced from an Actual Survey in 16 Sheets, with a dedication "to the Right Honorable George Montague Earl of Cardigan, Baron Brudenell &c."

In 1765, she published A Set of Plans and Forts of America, a compilation atlas booklet consisting of thirty plans of forts and locales that had played important roles in the recently concluded French and Indian War; the atlas also included a small Plan of the City of Albany, which among other things showed the location of Fort Frederick along the city’s northwest edge. Rocque's plan of Fort Federick and of the City of Albany are considered the two earliest published maps of the city of Albany, New York. A Set of Plans and Forts of America were described by academic researcher Will C. van den Hoonaard as "a paean to British victory and a celebration of the enlarged empire".

Around 1769, Rocque transferred most of her family cartography business to printer and publisher Carington Bowles (1723-1793).

Maps published by Mary Ann Rocque are in many libraries and archives, including the National Archives, the Massachusetts Historical Society, the United States Military Academy, the University of Virginia, the British Library, and the UK Hydrographic Office. Some of Rocque's maps were published under the name M. A. Rocque.

== Death ==
Rocque was buried 8 May 1774 at St James's Church, Paddington.
