= John Edmund Halpin =

Irish miniaturist and actor

- Born: 1764; Dublin, Ireland
- Died: unknown
- Known for: miniaturist

John Edmund Halpin or Halpen (born 1764) was an Irish miniaturist and actor.

== Life ==
Portrait of a gentleman by Halpin

John Edmund Halpin was born in 1764 in Dublin. His parents were the engraver, Patrick Halpen, and his wife, Eleanor. Possibly taught by his father, Halpin attended the Dublin Society's Schools, and was taught by Francis Robert West and John James Barralet. In 1780, he exhibited copies of their drawings in pastel at the Society of Artists on William Street. His father sent him to London for further study, and Halpin lived there for a number of years. On 29 July 1794, Halpin married Rebecca Woodriff (1770–1845). Rebecca was from Deptford.

While in London, he was encouraged to pursue acting, which he had wanted to do since he was young, by Charles Macklin. He resisted that, and instead returned to Dublin and began practising as a miniature painter. However, he eventually abandoned his painting career for acting, and in 1790 he made his first stage appearance at Crow Street Theatre. His debut was deemed a success, but ultimately he was unable to make a career of it and he returned to painting. In March 1790, his portrait of Pierre in Venice Preserved was reproduced in Hibernian Magazine. His miniature of William Macredy was engraved by W. Ridley for Parson's Minor Theatre, 1794.

Strickland records that he returned to London as a miniature painter, but there are no more details known about his life. Jeffares believed that he did not return to Dublin in the 1790s, and instead moved to Paris. In 1804, he received permission to remain in Paris following the resumption of war between France and England, and he continued to work for the Museé Napoléon copying works.
