= Salton Buttes =

Active volcanoes in Southern California

- Niland Field
- Location within southern California Location within California

Highest point
- Elevation: −40 m (−130 ft)
- Coordinates: 33.197°N 115.616°W

Geology
- Formed by: continental rifting
- Last eruption: ~3,000 years ago

The Salton Buttes are a group of volcanoes in Southern California, on the Salton Sea. They consist of a 7-kilometer-long (4.3 mi) row of five lava domes, named Mullet Island, North Red Hill, Obsidian Butte, Rock Hill, and South Red Hill. They are closely associated with a fumarolic field and a geothermal field, and there is evidence of buried volcanoes underground. In pre-modern times, Obsidian Butte was an important regional source of obsidian.

The Salton Buttes lie within the Salton Trough, a tectonic depression formed by the San Andreas Fault and the San Jacinto Faults. The depression forms the northward extension of the Gulf of California, and is separated from it by the Colorado River Delta. A number of geothermal and volcanic features are located in the area, which is a region of active seafloor spreading.

While the Salton Buttes were formerly considered to be of the late Pleistocene epoch (which ended with the end of the Last Glacial Maximum), newer dating efforts have determined that all of them formed more recently, during the current Holocene epoch, mostly through effusive eruptions. Future eruptions are possible and could endanger the surroundings.

== Geomorphology and geography ==
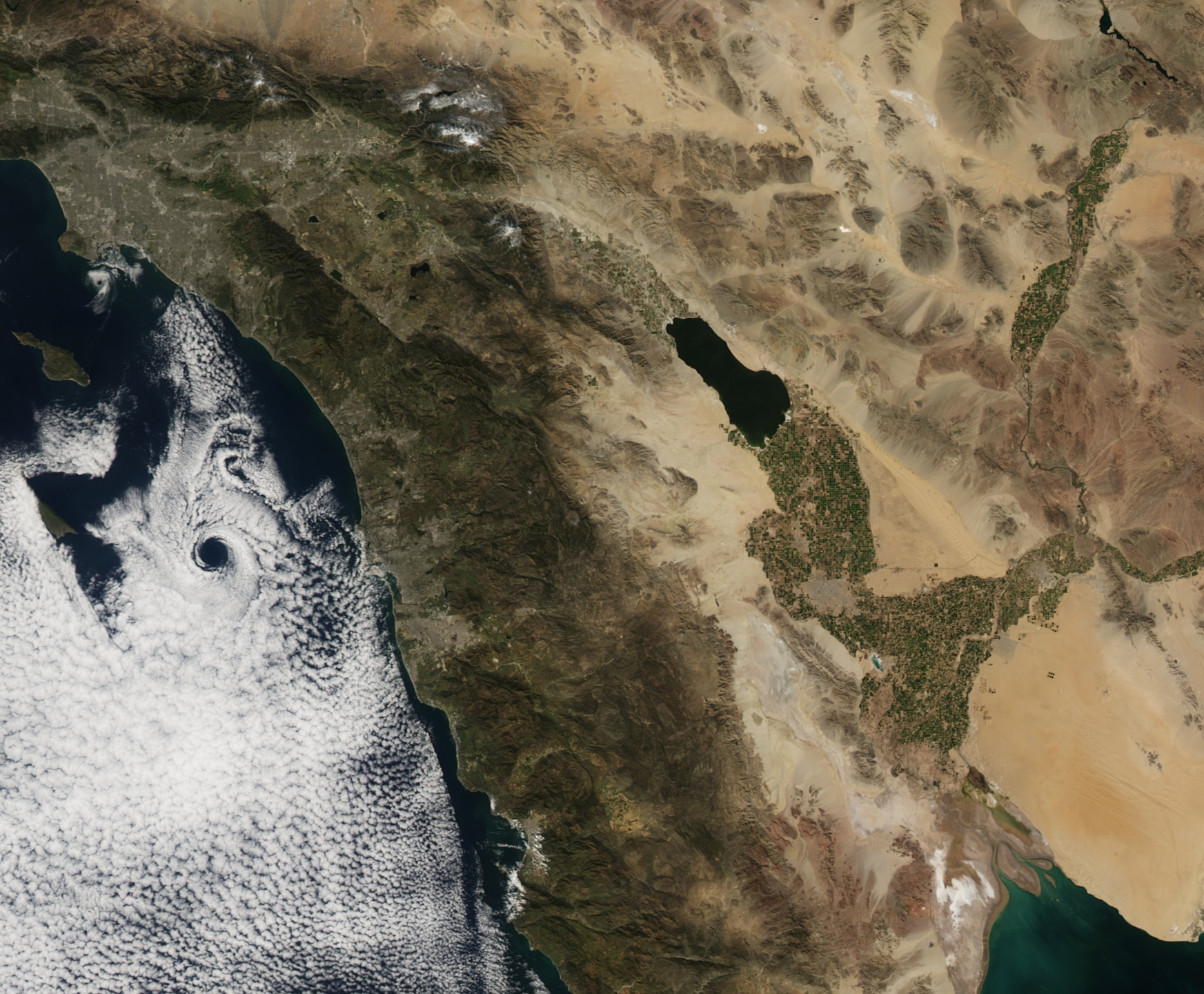
Salton Trough area. The red lines are simplified faults. Right-lateral direction of motion of the transform fault is shown (pink arrows). The red rhombs are pull-apart basins; the northern one is the site of the Niland geothermal field, the southern the Cerro Prieto geothermal field.

The Salton Buttes lie on the southeastern shores of the Salton Sea, with their peaks at an elevation of −40 m (−130 ft), in Imperial County, California. The towns of Niland and Calipatria lie northeast and southeast of the Salton Buttes, respectively, and Palm Springs is 140 kilometers (90 mi) northwest. The Alamo River enters the Salton Sea between the Salton Buttes. The name "Niland Field" has also been applied to the system.

The Salton Buttes are five lava domes that rise 30–40 m (98–131 ft) above the surrounding terrain. Each peak is no wider than 1 km (0.62 mi), but together they form a chain 7 km (4.3 mi) long. From north to south, they are named Mullet Island (33°13′32″N 115°36′30″W), North Red Hill (33°12′0″N 115°36′43″W), South Red Hill (33°11′46″N 115°36′42″W), Rock Hill (33°11′1″N 115°37′24″W), and Obsidian Butte (33°10′17″N 115°38′16″W).

Of the buttes, the Red Hills and Obsidian Butte are the largest. The Red Hills are a paired volcano, connected through pyroclastic deposits. The Red Hills are also known collectively as Red Island; Red Island and Mullet Island were both islands in 2005. As of 2018, Mullet Island is a peninsula. The other domes have also been islands at times, and waves have cut erosional terraces along the former shorelines.

The Salton Buttes are lava domes. They formed from viscous lava rising in a volcanic vent 250 m (820 ft) wide. Obsidian Butte is surrounded by a lava flow, and Mullet Island has a characteristic "onion-skin" foliation. On Red Hill, there is a quarry, a marina, and a trailer park, and Obsidian Butte has been extensively quarried, to the point that it has lost most of its original appearance. There are hot springs and mofettes on Mullet Island.

A fumarole field is associated with the Salton Buttes. The field is characterized by gryphons (Note: Gryphons are mud volcanoes less than 3 m (9.8 ft) high.) and salses. (Note: Salses are water-filled pools formed where gas seeps out, a variant form of mud volcano.) These exhale carbon dioxide and steam, as well as ammonia and hydrogen sulfide. Some of these fumarolic vents reach heights of 2 m (6.6 ft), and resemble the lava-erupting vents. Mud pots are also found. Parts of the field have recently emerged from the Salton Sea, due to dropping water levels, which have also caused the fumarolic vents to develop and grow noticeably, including an increased number of gryphons.

There is a geothermal field associated with the Salton Buttes. It is one of the largest and warmest on Earth, with temperatures of 360 °C (680 °F) at 1.5–2.5 km (0.93–1.55 mi) depth. Various volcanic rocks have been found in drill cores at the Salton Buttes. Rocks found include andesite, basalt, dacite, diabase, gabbro, and rhyolite. Some of these volcanic rocks bear traces of hydrothermal alteration. In some places the layers of volcanic rocks are as thick as 100 m (330 ft). There may be other volcanoes buried in the sediment pile; at least four separate aeromagnetic anomalies have been found at the Salton Buttes, and these may be signs of buried volcanoes. The field has been prospected for geothermal power generation, and presently eleven geothermal power plants in the Imperial Valley Geothermal Project have capacity to produce 432 megawatts of power.

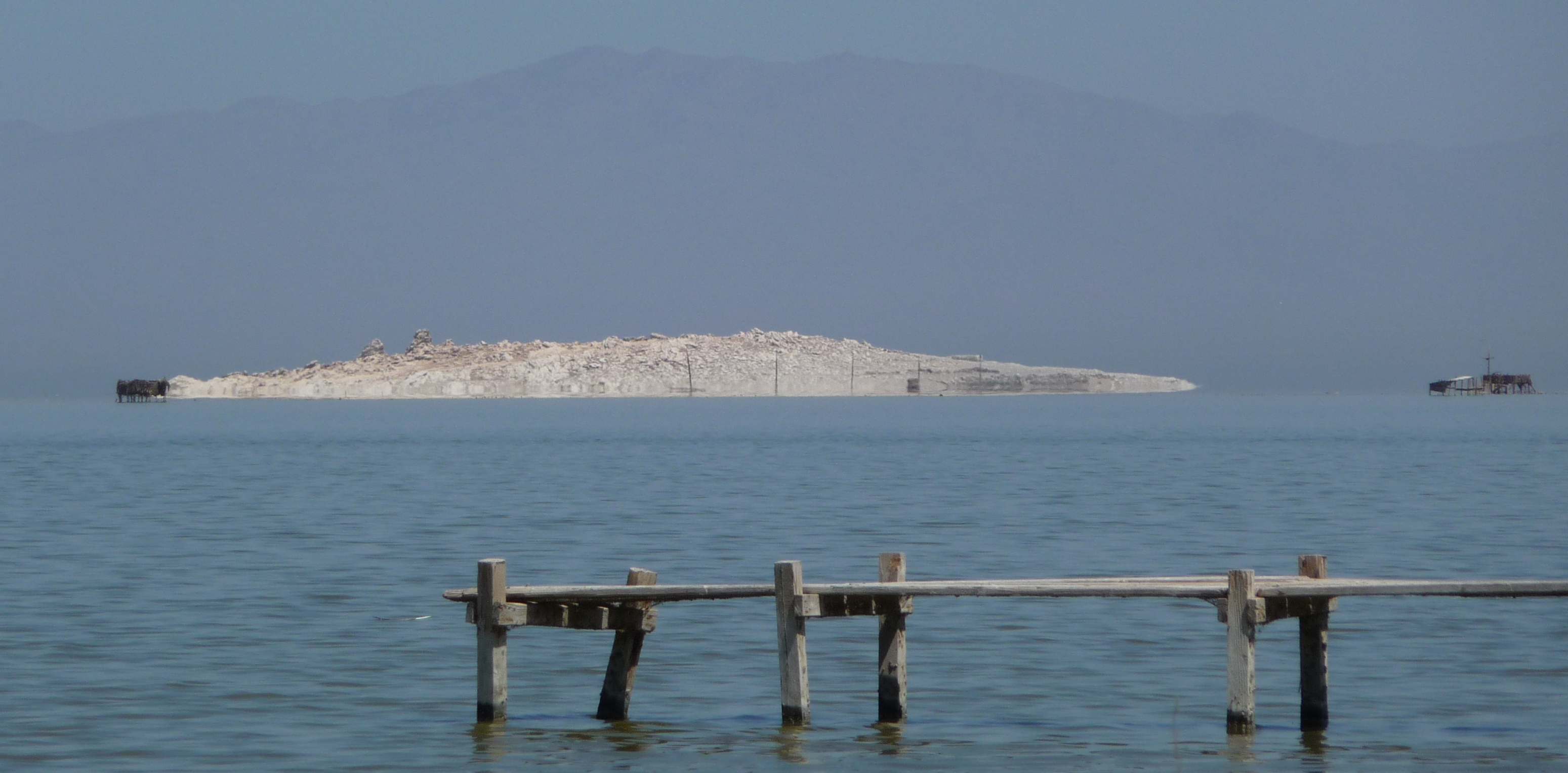
Mullet Island

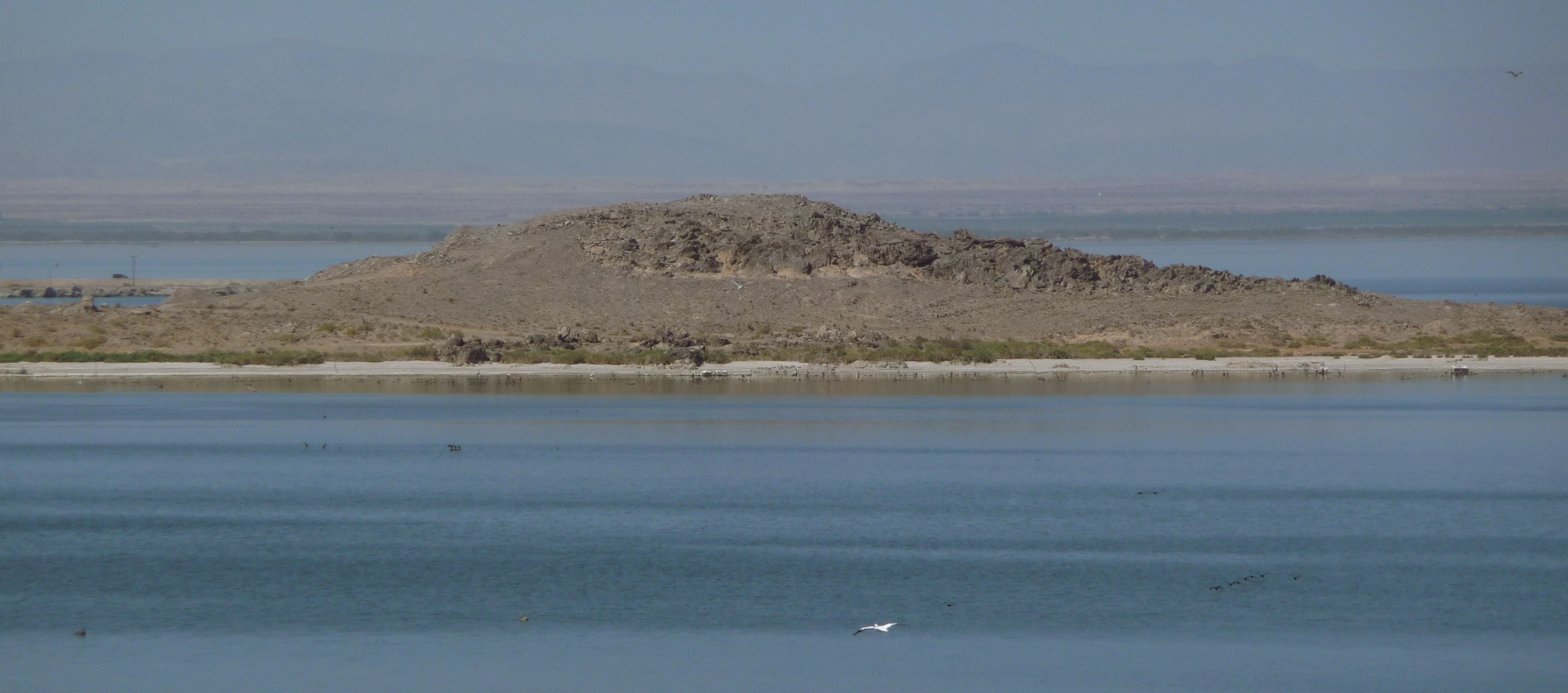
Obsidian Butte

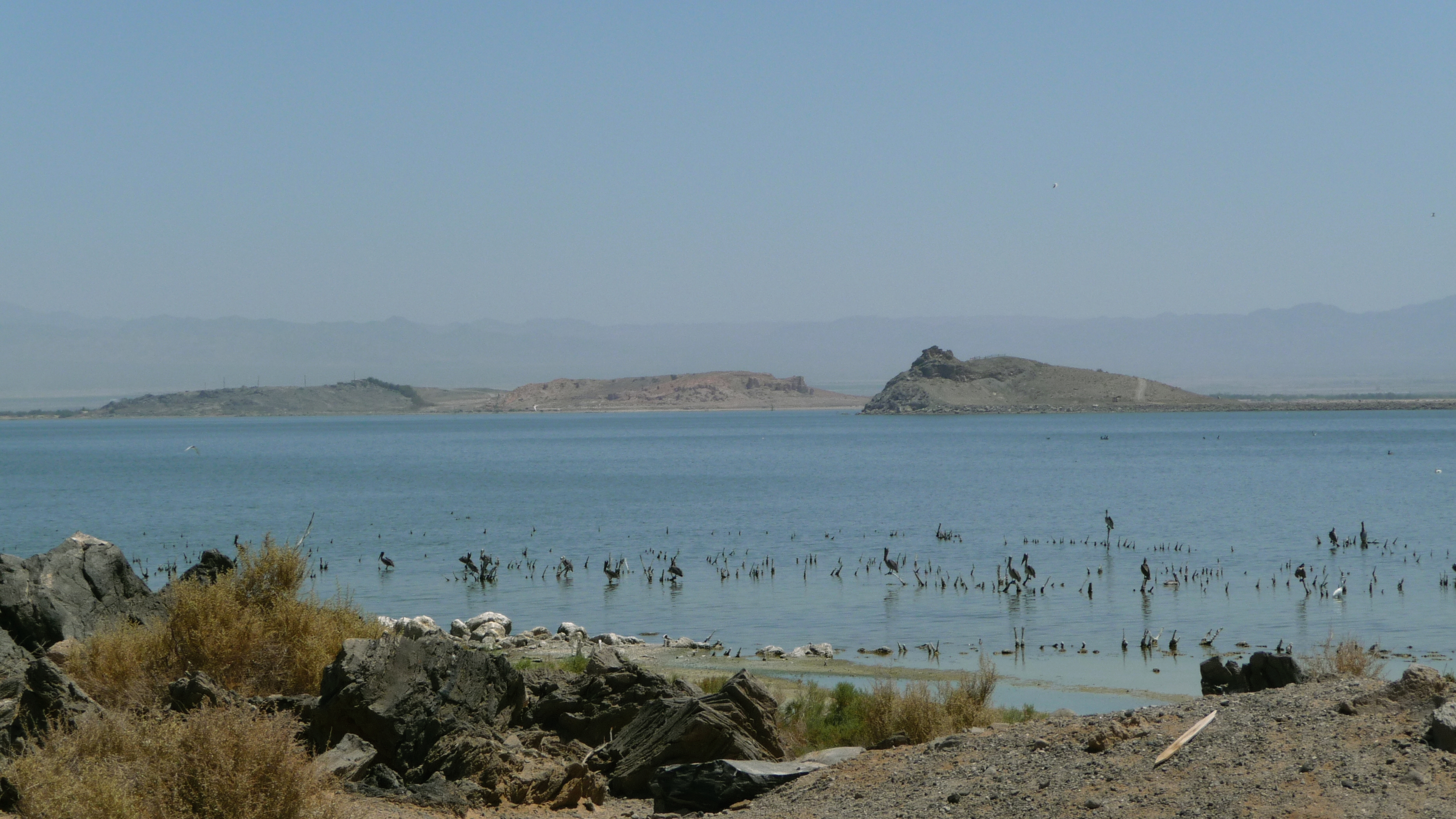
Red Island (center, reddish, low-lying) and Rock Hill (taller, steep dark knob at peak)

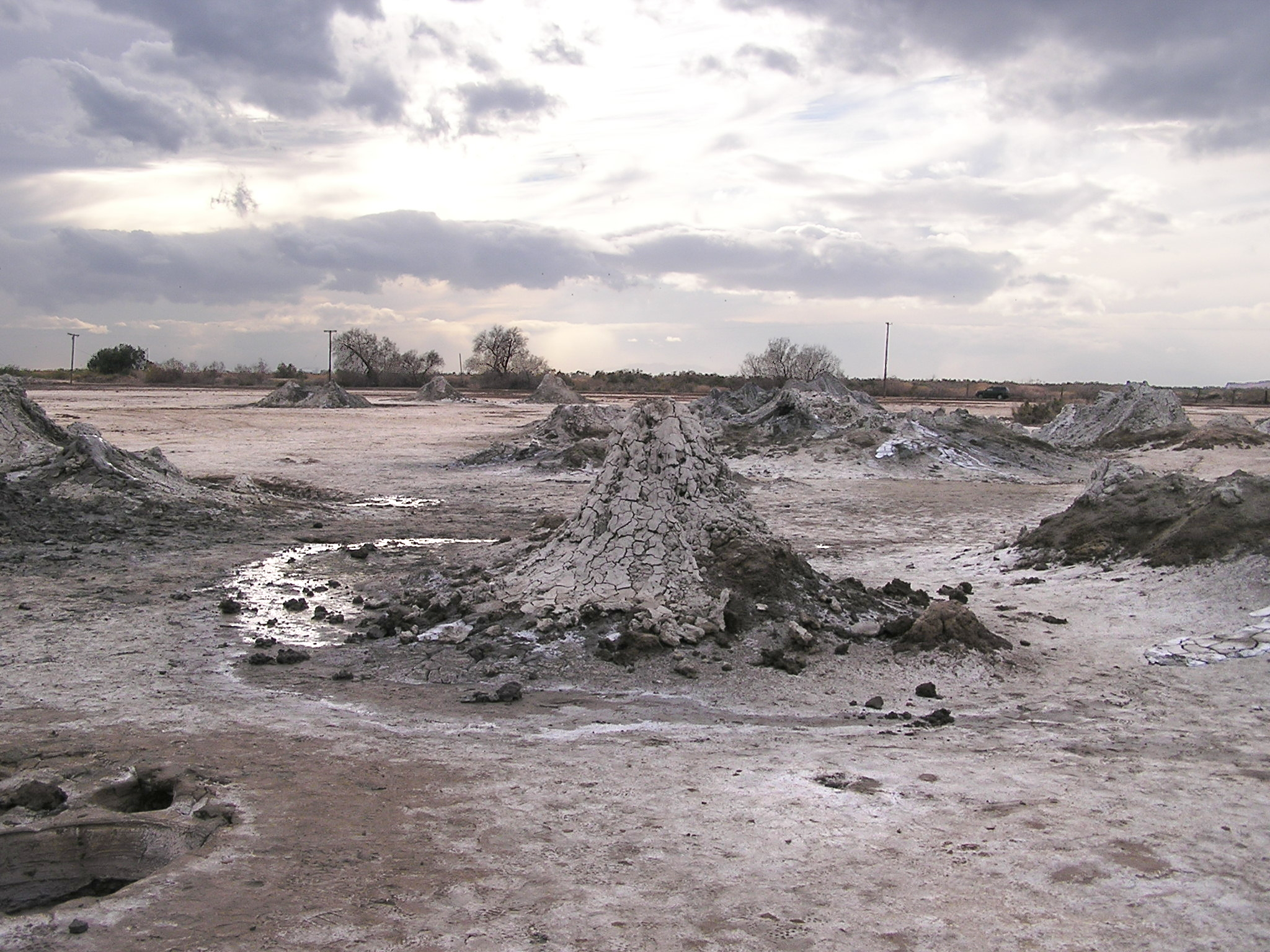
Mud volcanoes close to the Salton Buttes. Center, a gryphon; left foreground, part of a salse

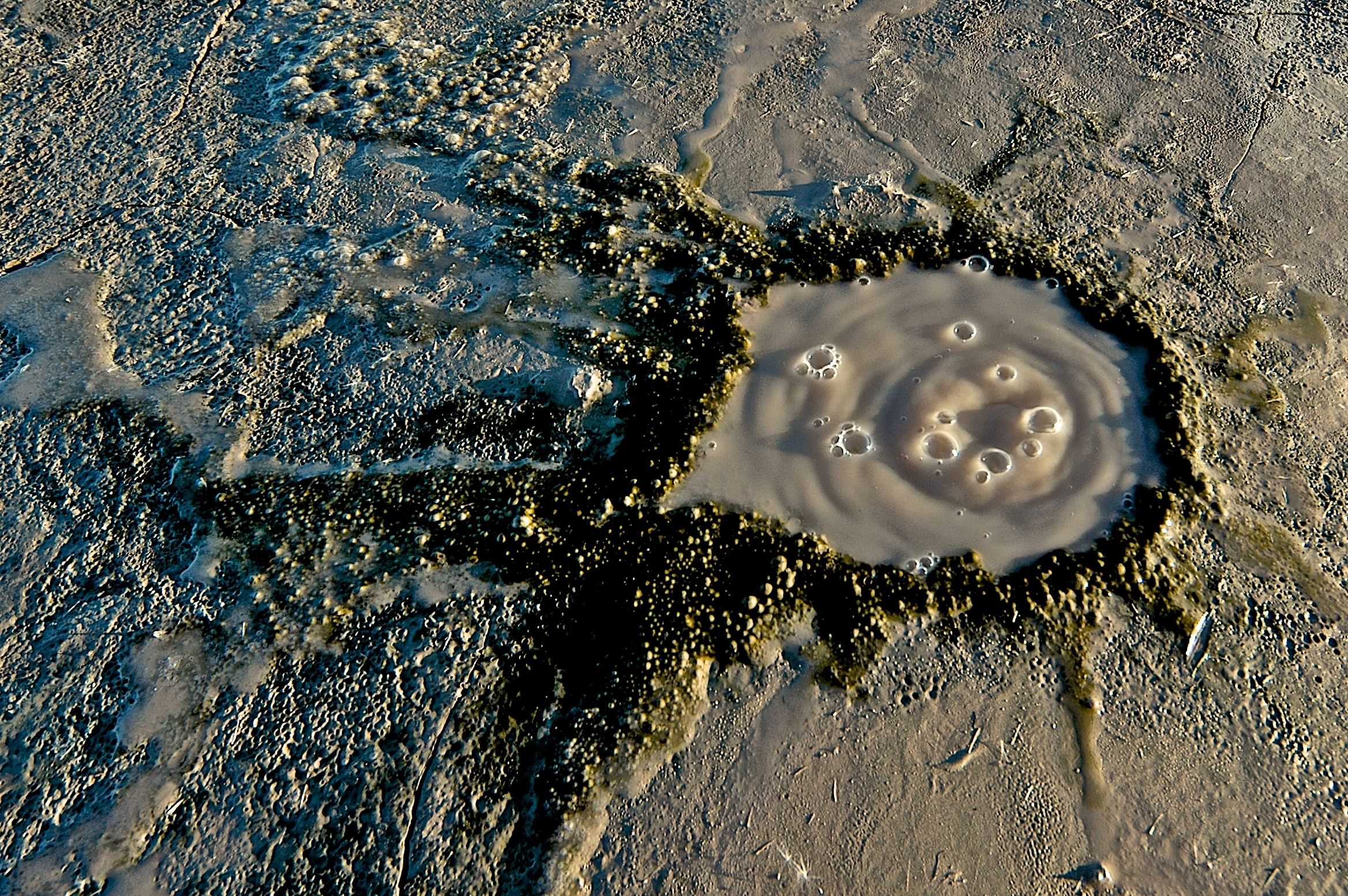
A salse bubbling carbon dioxide

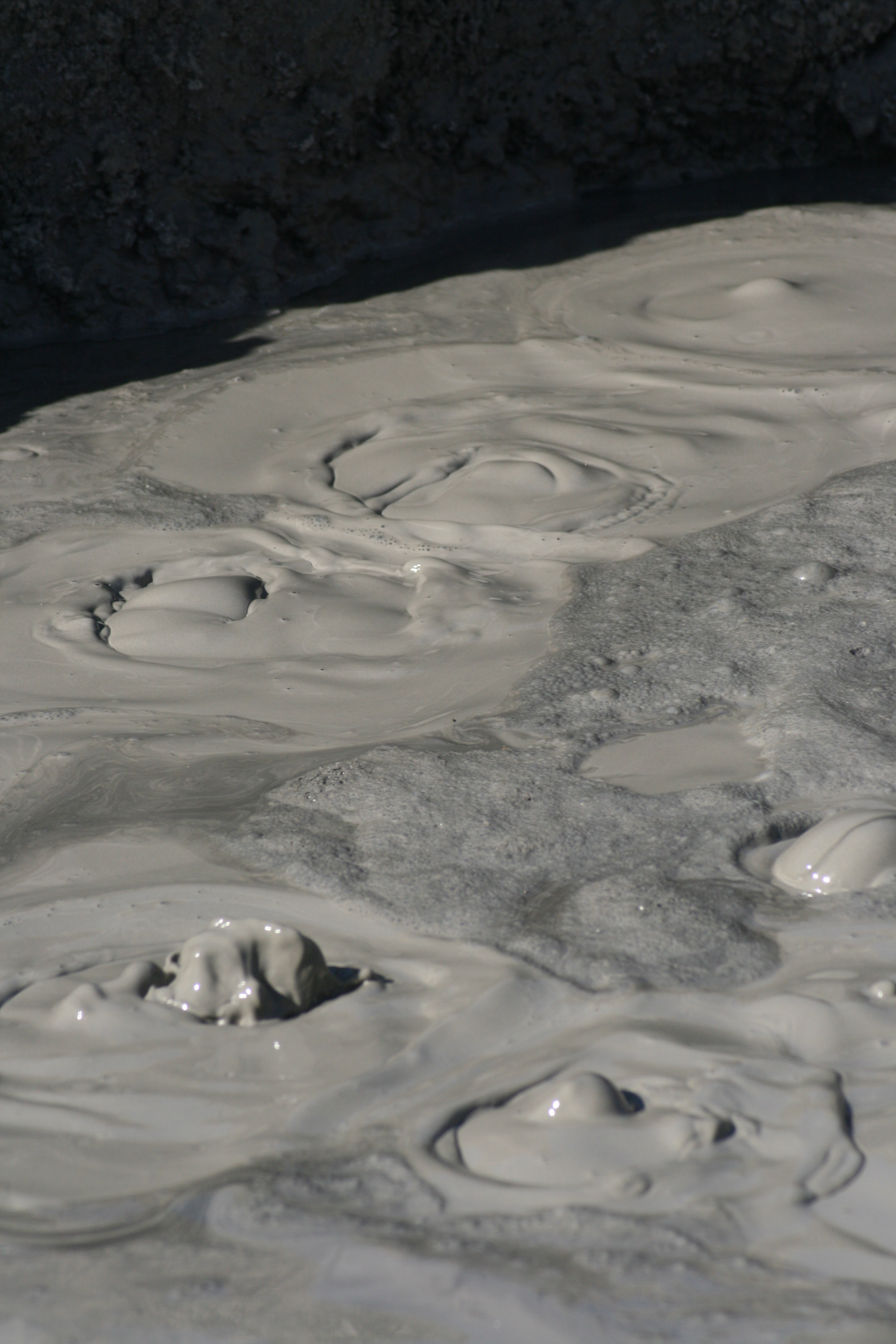
A mudpot bubbling hydrogen sulfide

== Geology ==
Since the Pliocene, the Salton Trough and the Gulf of California have formed an active rift zone south of the San Andreas Fault. In a rift zone, seafloor spreading is underway, accompanied by volcanic and geothermal activity, active faulting, (Note: Such as the Imperial Fault, the San Andreas Fault and the San Jacinto Fault) a thinned crust and rapid sedimentation.

Since five million years ago, the buildup of sediments in the Colorado River Delta separated the Salton Trough area from the actual Gulf of California, forming a large depression that currently reaches a depth of 40 m (130 ft) below sea level. This depression is a pull-apart basin. It has formed between various branches of the San Andreas Fault and the San Jacinto Fault (which are connected by the Brawley Seismic Zone) The Salton Trough is still actively subsiding at rates of 3 mm/a (0.12 in/year), increasing to 4–8 mm/a (0.16–0.31 in/year) in the central area of the Trough.

A number of Quaternary volcanic centers have formed in the region, including Cerro Prieto, Consag Rock, Isla San Luis, Isla Tortuga, the Salton Buttes, and Sierra Pinacate, which is the largest of these volcanoes. Strong geothermal activity has been observed as well, with the Salton Trough alone hosting five geothermal fields (Brawley-Mesquite, Cerro Prieto, East Mesa, Heber, and Salton Sea). These five fields have a total heat output of 1–10 GW. Part of this heat output is used to generate geothermal power, with annual production of 1–3 TWh/a (110–340 MW).

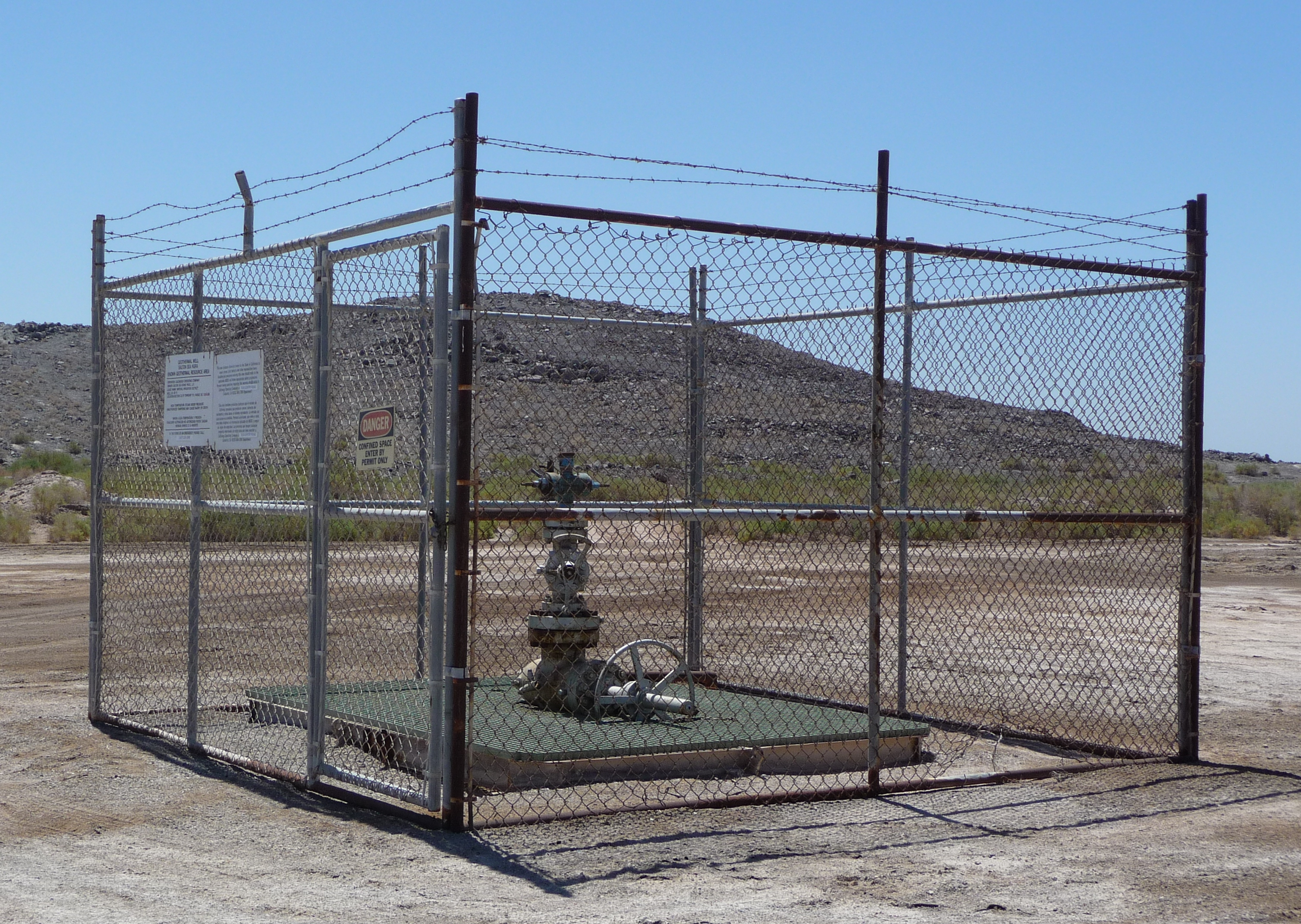
A geothermal well at Obsidian Butte

The Salton Buttes volcanoes were formed on Quaternary sediments of the Colorado River Delta. Below them, the basement is rock formed from sediments deposited in lakes and by rivers, such as mudstones, sandstones, and siltstones. Below this 5-kilometer-thick (3.1 mi) upper layer, there are metamorphic greenschist rocks formed by hydrothermal alteration and thermal metamorphism of sediments, and finally, below that, gabbroic rocks, at 18–10 km (11.2–6.2 mi) depth. Diabase and intruded rhyolites have also been identified in the sediments.

All of the Salton Buttes, except for Mullet Island, have developed on a lineament, a linear feature with a conspicuous magnetic anomaly. The volcanoes seem to share a common feeder dyke. This dyke may be connected to deep-seated extensional processes along a transform fault that links the San Andreas Fault to the Gulf of California. The source of heat for the volcanoes and geothermal field is unclear: both deep mafic and shallow felsic sources have been proposed. Seismic tomography of the area below the Salton Buttes has identified areas in the mantle with an anomalously low seismic velocities, which would be consistent with higher temperatures there.

=== Composition ===
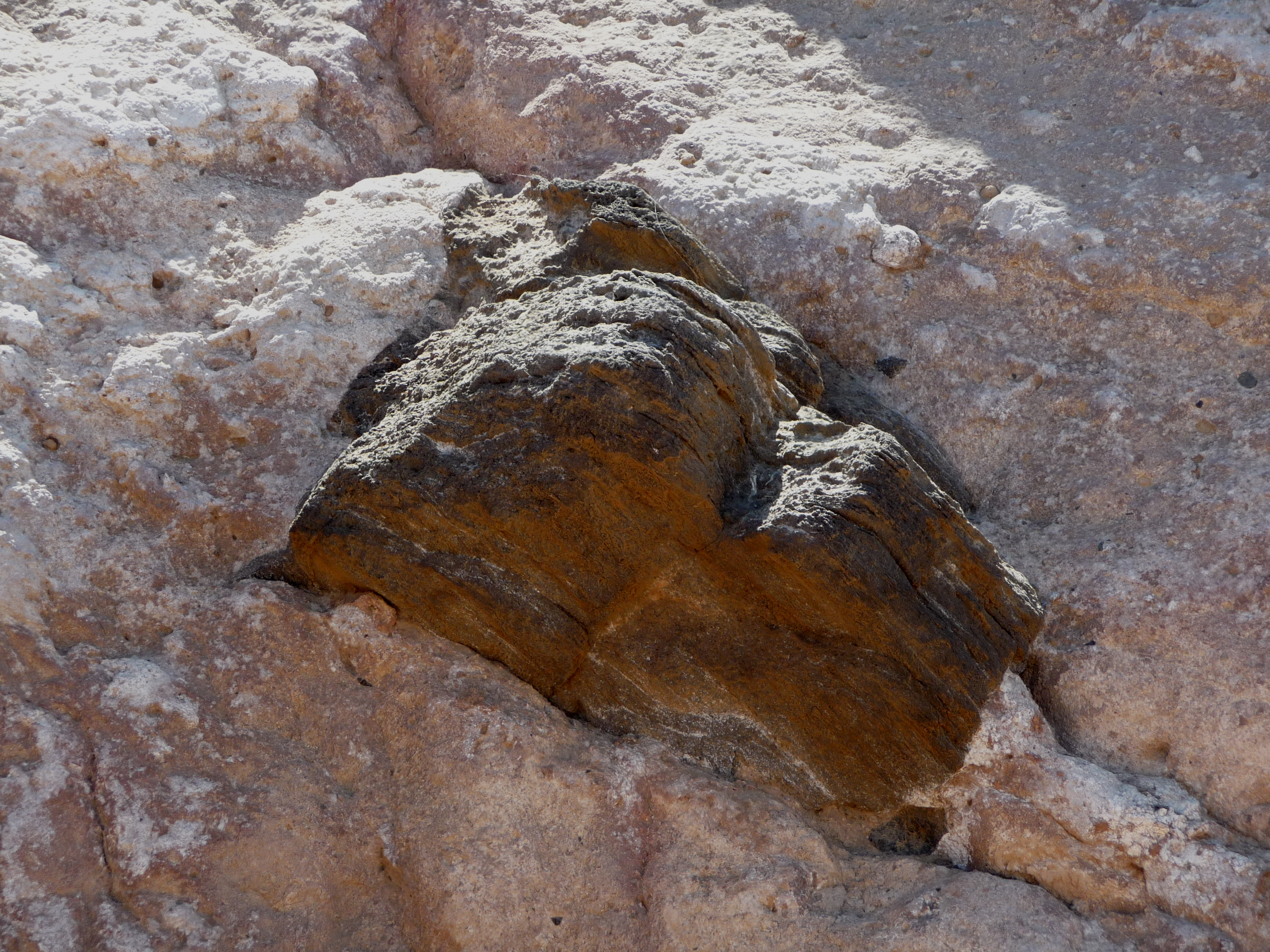
A xenolith on Red Island

The domes are formed by rhyolite, which has an alkaline and calcium-poor composition and defines a potassium-rich suite (see QAPF diagram). Scarce phenocrysts include amphibole, anorthoclase, apatite, clinopyroxene, ilmenite, magnetite, orthopyroxene, quartz, and zircon. The isotopic composition of these volcanic rocks differs from that of the Salton Trough sediments. The total volume of the domes is about 0.5 km^{3} (0.12 mi^{3}).

Obsidian from Obsidian Butte has been identified in distant archeological sites. It has been found in sites in the Colorado Desert, across San Diego County, and across northern Mexico and the Southwestern United States. Before Obsidian Butte was emplaced and thus became available for obsidian production, people in the region used obsidian from the Coso volcanic field; this trend away from Coso towards Obsidian Butte was recognized even before the exact timing of the Obsidian Butte eruption was known.

How the magmas are formed is controversial. Explanations have called on several different processes, including assimilation of hydrothermally altered rocks, fractional crystallization, and partial melting. One model presumes the existence of a continuously active deep magmatic reservoir, which generates precursor magmas and episodically delivers them to a shallower magmatic reservoir, where the rhyolites are formed. The zircon ages indicate that the magma system produced rhyolitic melts long before the Holocene eruptions.

Xenoliths found in the volcanic rocks include granite, granophyre, metasediments, and tholeiite, often heavily altered by interactions with the volcanic system. Some of these basalts resemble those from active rift zones in the Gulf of California and the East Pacific Rise. The northernmost segment of the East Pacific Rise appears to be identical to the Brawley Seismic Zone.

== Eruption history ==
Most of the Buttes formed between 1,800 and 2,300 years ago, although Mullet Island may be 5,000 years older. According to the Global Volcanism Program, Mullet Island formed 290 BCE ± 100 years, Obsidian Butte 10 CE ± 100 years, and the other Buttes 210 CE ± 100 years. If Mullet Island formed at the same time as the other Buttes, then the eruptive episode that formed the Salton Buttes lasted probably no more than 500 years. These eruptions might be just the last events in a more prolonged history, which at Mullet Island could go back 12,000 years. Presently, fumarolic activity occurs at the Buttes from cracks in the volcanic rocks of the Salton Buttes, and seismic activity has been recorded from the geothermal field.

=== Research history ===
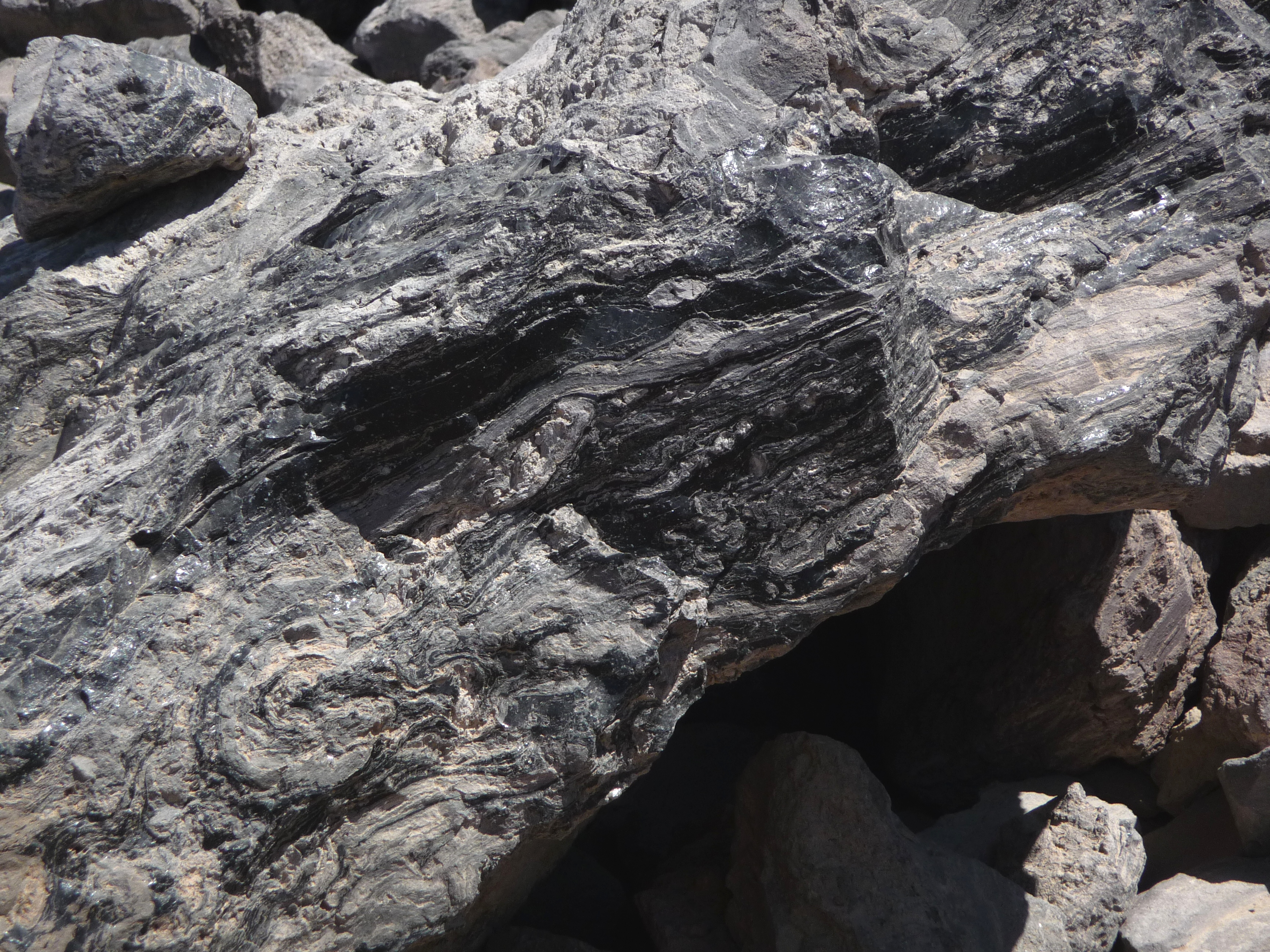
Obsidian, or volcanic glass, on Obsidian Butte. Obsidian quarried here was widely traded and used to make stone tools.

Various ages have been inferred for the Salton Buttes with various dating techniques. Early potassium-argon dating at Obsidian Butte yielded an age of 55,000–16,000 years before present, but this estimate was later supplanted by another age estimate of 33,000 ± 35,000 years ago. Other proposed ages were 33,000 ± 18,000 and less than 10,000 years ago, and archeomagnetic methods concluded that the Salton Buttes were not simultaneously active with Cerro Prieto or Crater Elegante in the Sierra Pinacate. Subsurface volcanic rocks at the Salton Buttes have been dated to 3.8 ± 0.4 million years ago, 960,000 ± 190,000 years ago, and 479,000–420,000 years ago, but some of the granites formed much more recently and are among the youngest known granites on Earth.

Radiometric dating of zircons found in the volcanic rocks and xenoliths as well as other methods, however, indicated that volcanic activity was much more recent, latest Pleistocene-Holocene. This recent conclusion was also supported by the fact that the small domes are located in a high-sedimentation-rate setting and would have been buried if they were too old and that obsidian from Obsidian Butte is only found in archaeological sites from the late Holocene. (Note: The absence of Obsidian Butte obsidian from older sites was previously explained as Obsidian Butte being submerged in Lake Cahuilla and thus unavailable for quarrying.) Obsidian hydration dating on the Salton Buttes yielded ages of 2,500-8,400 years ago, while thermoluminescence dating at Obsidian Butte has yielded an age of 3,300 ± 500 years ago, both implying recent ages. An even more recent age for Obsidian Butte is 490 BCE. The discovery of the exact age of Obsidian Butte is of archeological importance, as the presence of Obsidian Butte obsidians in an archaeological site would imply that the site must post-date the eruption of Obsidian Butte. The emplacements of Obsidian Butte and Red Hill probably occurred within a short time—less than five centuries apart. Based on carbon dating of present Obsidian Butte artifacts, it has been found that the interval from which these were harvested was between 510 BCE to 640 CE, further signifying at which time the Obsidian Butte was accessible.

=== Sequence of eruptive activity ===
The domes were formed by effusive eruptions, but at least Obsidian Butte and South Red Hill also experienced explosive eruptions, which at Obsidian Butte preceded the effusive eruption stage. These explosive eruptions deposited pumice and tephra, which were encountered in drill cores in the area, and have also been quarried. Tuffs found farther south, at Cerro Prieto, have been linked to the Salton Buttes, but the large distance makes such a link questionable.

After their emplacement, the Salton Buttes were at times submerged in Lake Cahuilla, (Note: A lake that existed in the region before the present-day Salton Sea. It covered much of the Salton Trough. This lake was formed by periodic diversions of the Colorado River into the Salton Trough, and the present-day Salton Sea formed between 1905 and 1907 from water spilling through a broken canal.) causing the formation of wave-cut terraces and rendering the obsidian of Obsidian Butte inaccessible. However, only South Red Hill appears to have erupted underwater. Pumice rafts formed on the lake and are now preserved on its former shorelines. Wind-borne and lacustrine sediments were also emplaced on the domes.

=== Hazards ===
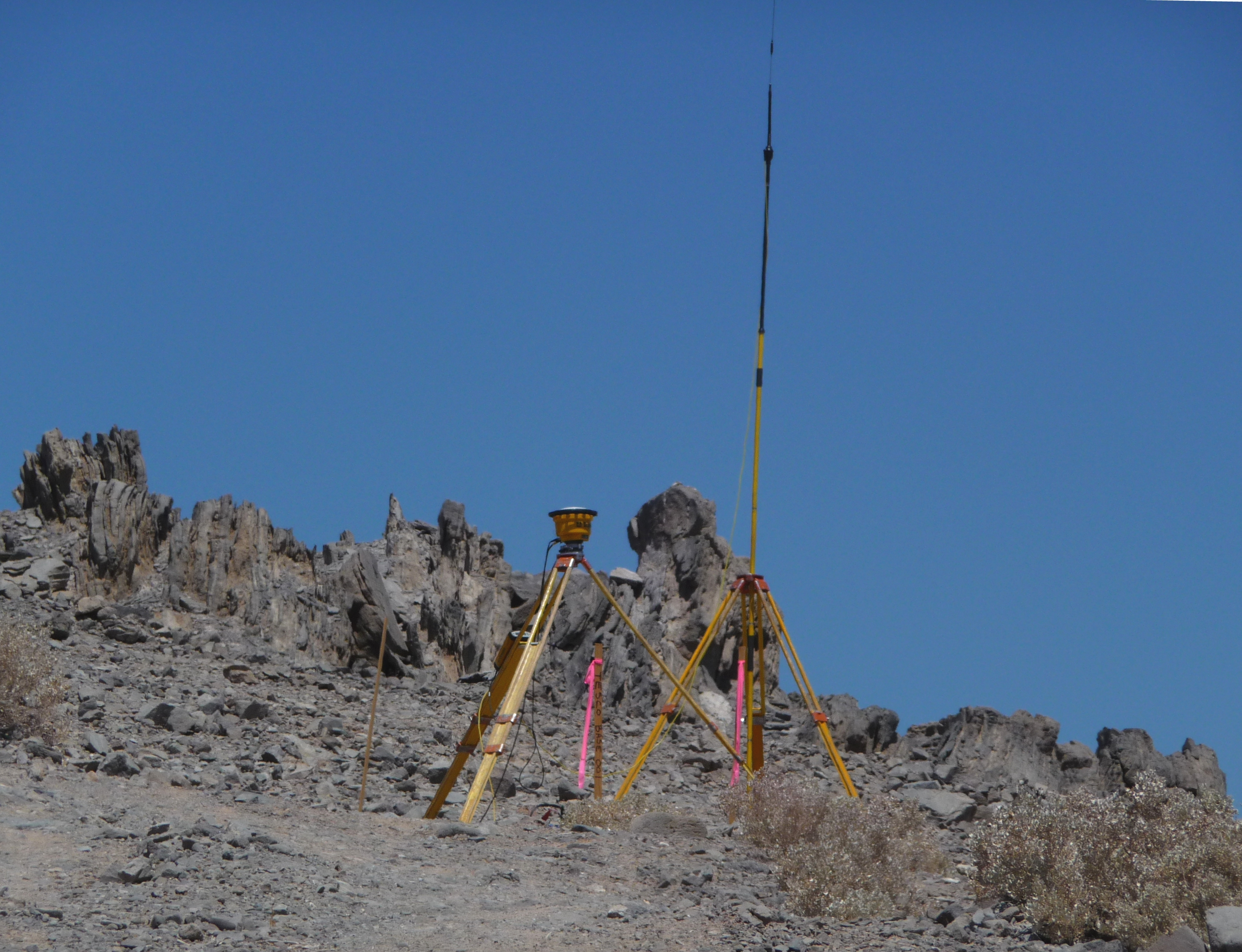
Monitoring devices on Obsidian Butte

The discovery of Holocene eruptions of the Salton Buttes have drawn attention to the volcanic hazards posed by the field. The Salton Buttes are monitored by the California Volcano Observatory for possible future volcanic activity. Geophysical evidence shows that liquid magma is still present underneath the Salton Buttes. Since the volcanoes have erupted in the past, since there is present-day unrest, and since there are areas of high population density nearby (about 2,518 people lived in the area in 2010), the Salton Buttes are considered high-hazard volcanoes. Future eruptions may generate pyroclastic flows and pyroclastic surges, which could endanger people within ten kilometers (6.2 mi) of the vents. The field is monitored with seismometers and periodic sampling of gas exhalations and hot springs; there is a volcano hazard map, but it is incomplete.

== See also ==
- Niland Geyser – Moving mudpot near Niland, California
