= Hardy River =

River in Baja California, Mexico

- Location of river mouth
- Native name: Río Hardy (Spanish)

Physical characteristics
- Source: Cerro Prieto
  - location: Near Nuevo León, Baja California
  - coordinates: 32°24′59″N 115°16′22″W
- Mouth: Colorado River
  - location: Baja California
  - coordinates: 32°08′52″N 115°17′19″W
- Length: 26 km (16 mi)

Basin features
- Major crossings: Baja California Highway 4

The Hardy River (Spanish: Río Hardy) is a 26-kilometer (16 mi)-long Mexican river formed by residual agricultural waters from the Mexicali Valley, and running into the Colorado River. The river is believed to have been an ancient channel of the Colorado, as well as the primary outflow for the prehistoric Lake Cahuilla.

== History ==
In prehistoric times, during the Holocene, the Colorado River periodically flowed north into the Salton Sink, forming a large lake called Lake Cahuilla. Eventually, this lake would fill, to about 30 feet above sea level, and at that point overflow its banks near Cerro Prieto, and run south to the Gulf of California; during those times, the Rio Hardy served as an overflow channel for Lake Cahuilla.

In the 19th century, an English lieutenant, R. W. H. Hardy, explored the Colorado River Delta, and noted that the main channel of the Colorado followed this course. Later, in the 1880s, sea captains noted that the main channel of the Colorado had moved east; this earlier channel became known as Hardy's Colorado.

== Hydrology ==
The watershed of the Hardy River includes runoff from the eastern foothills of Sierra de Los Cucapah to the west and the southern slope of Cerro Prieto.

Due the dynamic course of the Colorado River within Mexicali Valley, the Hardy River may have periodically become the primary watercourse of the Colorado as it flowed south to the Gulf of California.

== Wildlife ==
The Rio Hardy is home to a variety of wildlife, including the mosquitofish and the sailfin molly

The Hardy's wetlands are a nesting ground for the snowy egrets (Egretta thula), and with the bird habitat, are part of a protected Mexican biosphere reserve, the Reserva de la Biosfera del Alto Golfo de California y Delta del Rio Colorado.

== Water quality ==
In recent years, the Hardy has become a drain for agricultural waters polluted with pesticides and fertilizers from the Mexicali Valley. The water quality in the Hardy is being monitored at Mexicali by the Centro de Investigacion en Alimentacion y Desarrollo A.C. (Food and Development Research Center) to measure the effects of discharge from the Las Arenitas wastewater treatment plant.

== See also ==
- List of tributaries of the Colorado River

== Sources ==
- The State of Baja California: Hydrology
- Deciding About the Colorado River Delta, River Report, Water Education Foundation, Spring 1999, by S. Joshua Newcom
- E.P.A.: California-Baja California Regional Workgroup: California-Baja California Water
- Río Hardy: A tribe without a river, by Celia Rosario Rivas and Luis Carlos Romero-Davis, Tucson Citizen, June 20, 2006
- Contaminants in Potential Prey of the Yuma Clapper Rail, U.S. Fish and Wildlife Service
