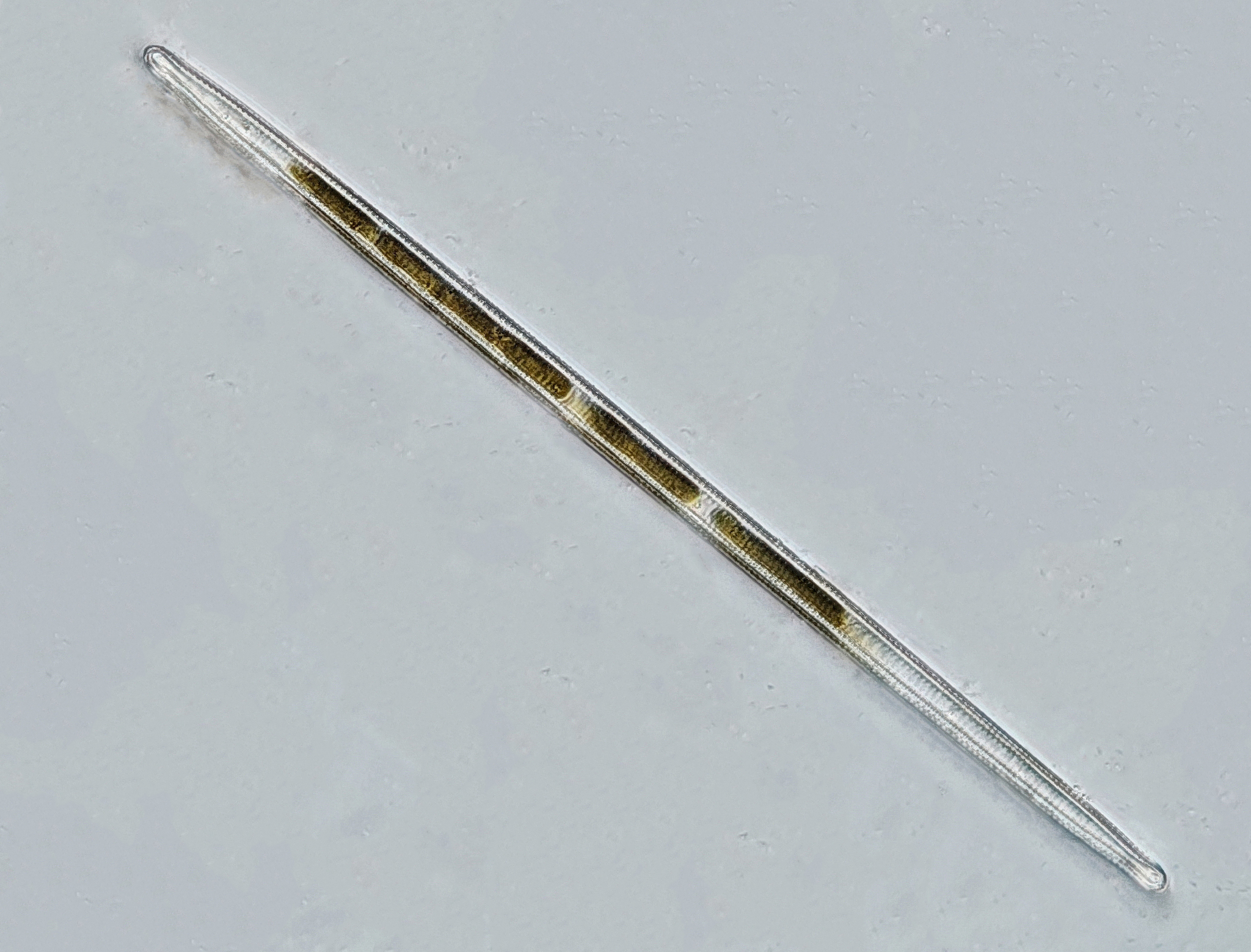

Scientific classification
- Domain: Eukaryota
- Clade: Sar
- Clade: Stramenopiles
- Division: Ochrophyta
- Clade: Bacillariophyta
- Class: Fragilariophyceae
- Order: Fragilariales
- Family: Fragilariaceae
- Genus: Ulnaria
- Species: U. ulna

Binomial name
- Ulnaria ulna Compère 2001

= Ulnaria ulna =

Species of single-celled organism

Ulnaria ulna is a species of diatom belonging to the family Ulnariaceae.

Synonym:

- Synedra ulna (Nitzsch) Ehrenberg 1832
