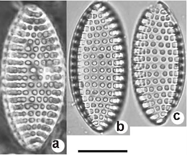

Scientific classification
- Domain: Eukaryota
- Clade: Sar
- Clade: Stramenopiles
- Division: Ochrophyta
- Clade: Bacillariophyta
- Class: Bacillariophyceae
- Order: Bacillariales
- Family: Bacillariaceae
- Genus: Tryblionella
- Species: T. granulata

Binomial name
- Tryblionella granulata (Grunow) D.G.Mann 1990

= Tryblionella granulata =

Species of single-celled organism

Tryblionella granulata is a species of diatom belonging to the family Bacillariaceae.

This species inhabits marine environments.
