= Superstition Hills =

Landform in Imperial County, California

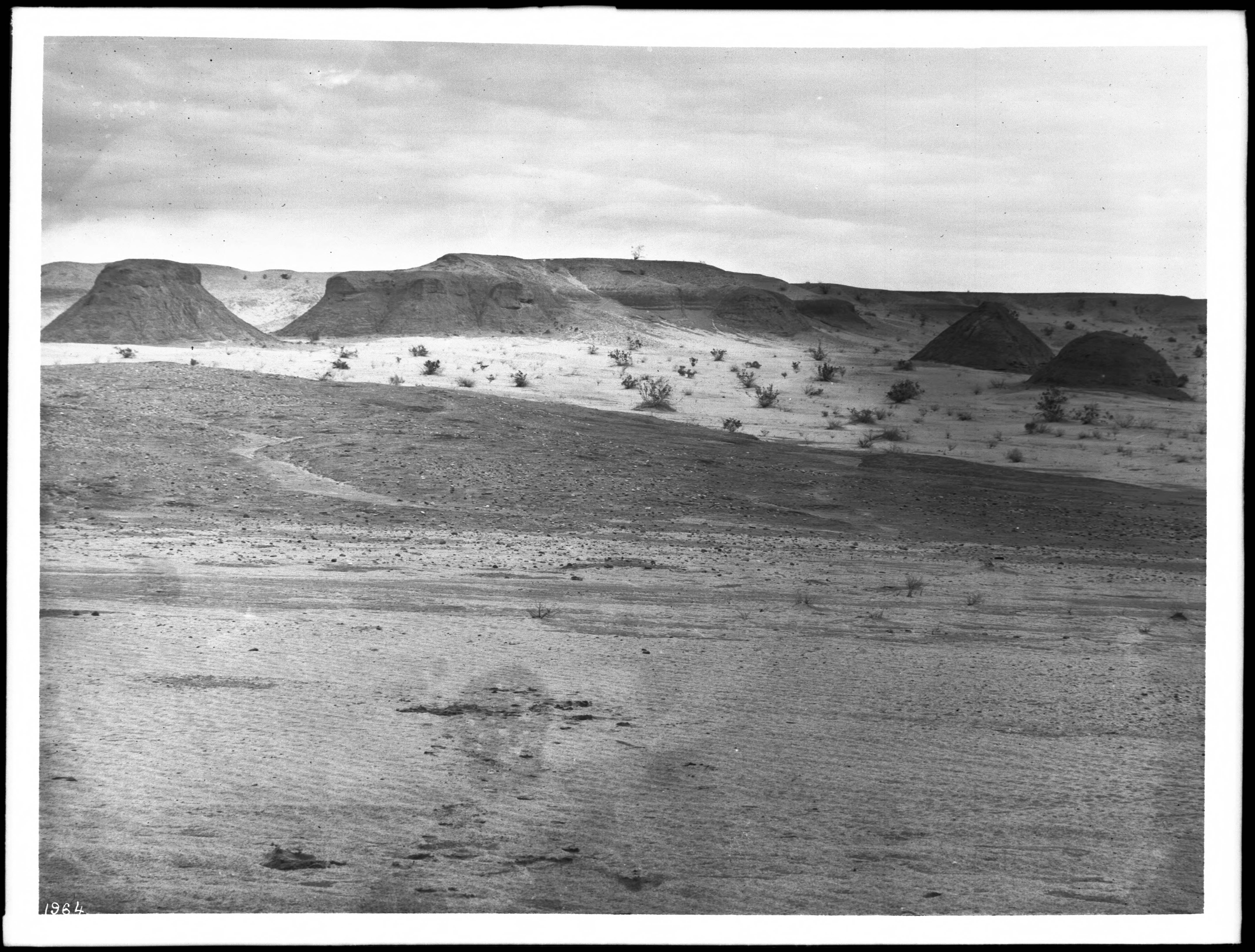
- 1900 photograph

Highest point
- Elevation: 141 ft (43 m)

Geography
- Location within California
- Country: United States
- State: California
- Region: Colorado Desert
- District: Imperial County
- Range coordinates: 33°1′15.179″N 115°48′47.005″W
- Topo map: USGS Kane Spring

The Superstition Hills are a low mountain range in the Colorado Desert, in western Imperial County, southern California.

They are located southwest of the Salton Sea, in the Lower Colorado River Valley.

== See also ==
- 1987 Superstition Hills earthquakes
