= Bernard Scalé =

Surveyor and cartographer

- Born: 1738; London, England
- Died: 1826 (aged 87–88); Essex, England
- Occupations: surveyor and cartographer

Bernard Scalé (1738–1826) was an English surveyor, cartographer and engraver known for his work in Ireland between 1754 and 1779.

== Life ==
Title page of An Hibernian Atlas (1776)

Peter Bernard Scalé was born in London in 1738. His father, Peter Scalé, was a Huguenot living in England. Scalé was a pupil of John Rocque, and Strickland states that he relocated to Dublin with Rocque to assist in the maps of Dublin in 1754, making Scalé 16 at the time.

Scalé married Rocque's sister, Henrietta, by late 1758, and was advertising to the public "That he surveys Counties, Cities, Gentlemen's Estates, &c. topographically, after the Manner of Mr. John Rocque his Brother-in-Law, by whom he was instructed." Scalé remained in Dublin after Rocque left in 1760, and established his own successful surveying practice. He exhibited at the Society of Artists in Ireland with Drawings of Surveys in 1766 and in 1770 with drawings of the demesnes of the Earl of Clanbrassil and of the Duke of Leinster. Among Scalé's pupils were James Asser, John Brownrigg, William Richards, and Thomas Sherrard, working in partnership with Brownrigg, Richards and Sherrard at different times. Scalé produced a large corpus of work in Ireland, including maps of many estates, towns, districts, and counties. In 1765, he charted the coast from Balbriggan, County Dublin to Wicklow Head. In 1767, he produced 5 engravings of the Parliament House after Rowland Omer.

The baptisms of 6 children of Scalé and Henrietta, and deaths of 4, between 1769 and 1773 in St Thomas's parish, Dublin.

In 1773 he produced a new edition of Rocque's map with Richards. From 1774, it appears that Scalé moved back to England, with an advertisement in September 1774 stating "instructions from persons residing in England or Foreign parts, will be received by Mr Scalé, at Mangrove near Burnwood [Brentwood], Essex; Domestic Commands as usual by Mssrs Brownrigg and Sherrard at their house, Lower Abbey-Street." Between 1763 and 1767, Scalé lived at George's Lane, Dublin, between 1768 and 1776 at Lower Abbey Street and 123 Lower Abbey Street in 1777, and finally 2 Essex Bridge between 1778 and 1779.

Samuel Bryon was an apprentice of Scalé, who then moved to Ireland in 1779 living at 123 Lower Abbey Street, Scalé's former home. Scalé ceases to appear in Dublin directories after 1779, living in Essex. Scalé died in 1826 at North Hill, Colchester. He was buried in Colchester.

An Hibernian Atlas was first published in 1776 by Robert Sayer and John Bennet, London, and was wholly based on Scalé's work.

== Gallery ==
Map of Ireland as published in An Hibernian Atlas (1776)

Map of the province of Ulster as published in An Hibernian Atlas (1776)

Map of the province of Munster as published in An Hibernian Atlas (1776)

Map of the province of Leinster as published in An Hibernian Atlas (1776)

Map of the province of Connaught as published in An Hibernian Atlas (1776)
