= John Rocque =

Surveyor and cartographer (c. 1704–1762)

- Jean Rocque
- Rocque's landmark 1746 map of London, Westminster, and Southwark
- Born: c. 1704; Kingdom of France
- Died: 27 January 1762 (aged 57–58); London, Great Britain
- Occupations: Surveyor, cartographer, engraver, landscape designer, map seller
- Years active: 1734–1762
- Known for: Map of London (1746); Map of Dublin (1756)
- Spouse(s): Martha (m. c. 1728) Mary Ann Bew (m. 1751)
- Family: Bartholomew Rocque (brother)

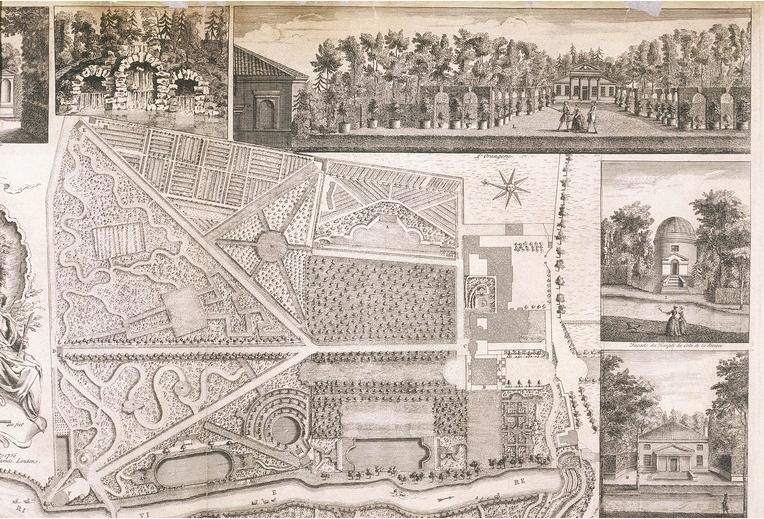
Rocque's plan of Chiswick House and gardens, 1736

John Rocque (originally Jean; c. 1704–1762) was a British surveyor, cartographer, engraver, landscape designer, and map seller. His detailed map of London was published in 1746, and his map of Dublin published in 1756.

== Early life and career ==
Rocque was born in France in about 1704, one of four children of a Huguenot family who subsequently fled first to Geneva, and then, probably in 1709, to England. He became a godfather in 1728, which suggests he was at least twenty-one years old by that time.

In addition to his work as a surveyor and mapmaker, Rocque was an engraver and map seller. He was also involved in some way in gardening as a young man, living with his brother Bartholomew, who was a landscape gardener, and producing plans for parterres, perhaps recording pre-existing designs, but few details of this work are known. Rocque produced engraved plans of the gardens at Wrest Park (1735), Claremont (1738), Charles Hamilton's naturalistic landscape garden at Painshill Park, Surrey (1744), Wanstead House (1745) and Wilton House (1746).

By 1734, Rocque was working from Great Windmill Street, St. James's, London, "at ye Canister and Sugar Loaf". From 1743 to 1748, he was established near Hyde Park.

One of Rocque's most famous works is his map of London. He began work on this in 1737 and it was published in 24 printed sheets in 1746. It was by far the most detailed map of London published up to that time and remains an important historical resource. Details included in this map are the locations of all the Huguenot churches.

The map of London and his other maps brought him an appointment as cartographer to Frederick, Prince of Wales in 1751. A fire in 1750 destroyed his premises and stock, but by 1753, he was employing ten draughtsmen, and The Small British Atlas: Being a New set of Maps of all the Counties of England and Wales appeared. There was a second edition in 1762.

He also surveyed and published maps of Middlesex, Oxford, Berkshire, and Buckinghamshire in 1760.

Rocque's Map of London, 1746

== Time in Dublin ==
Rocque spent six years visiting Dublin from August 1754 to 1760, where he produced a number of maps of the Irish capital, as well as county maps of Dublin and Armagh, city maps of Kilkenny and Cork, and a series of elaborately illustrated manuscript surveys of the estates of James FitzGerald, 1st Duke of Leinster. He lived at the Golden Hart, Dame Street initially, later moving to Ormond Quay in August 1755, and then Bachelor's Walk in June 1756. He began selling his survey of Dublin Bay in November 1754, and advertised for subscriptions to a full map of the city in September of the same year.

In 1756, he published the first detailed printed map of Dublin, the 4-sheet Exact Survey of Dublin (officially entitled An Exact Survey of the City and Suburbs of Dublin in Which is Express'd the Ground Plot of all Publick Buildings Dwelling Houses Ware Houses Stables Courts Yards &c by John Rocque Chorographer to their Royal Highnesses The Late & Present Prince of Wales - 1756). George II hung a print of The city and suburbs of Dublin (1757) in his apartments. A detail from this map later featured on the Irish Series B ten pound banknote (1976–1993).

He also published The city and suburbs of Dublin with divisions of the parishes, reduced from the large plan in four sheets (1757), The city, harbour, bay and environs of Dublin (1757), and Pocket plan of the city of Dublin (1757). It appears he intended to survey Cork and Kinsale harbours, but these projects did not come to fruition. He sold many of his maps in French, and imported maps to sell.

Rocque also covered the hinterland of Dublin in A Survey of the City Harbour Bay and Environs of Dublin, published in four sheets in 1758. These extended as far as Skerries and Cardy Rocks to the north, Carton House to the west, Blessington to the south-west and Enniskerry to the south. In 1760 the Irish engraver John Dixon engraved Rocque's map of County Dublin. He took on pupils in Ireland, with his influence on their estate maps is well documented. These pupils included Samuel Andrews, John Powell, and Matthew Wren.

== Personal life ==
Rocque married twice, firstly to Martha (circa 1728), and secondly, Mary Ann Bew. Mary was the older sister of one of Rocque's apprentices, Bernard Scalé. Mary continued the business after Rocque's death, in collaboration with her brother. Rocque died in London on 27 January 1762.
