= 1968 Borrego Mountain earthquake =

Earthquake in California

- UTC time: 1968-04-09 02:28:58
- ISC event: 823631
- USGS-ANSS: ComCat
- Local date: April 8, 1968; 58 years ago
- Local time: 6:28 p.m. PST
- Magnitude: 6.6 M_{w}
- Depth: 11.1 km (6.9 mi)
- Epicenter: 33.180°N 116.103°W
- Type: Strike-slip
- Areas affected: Southern California
- Total damage: Minor
- Max. intensity: MMI VII (Very strong)
- Casualties: None

The 1968 Borrego Mountain earthquake occurred on April 8, at 18:28 PST in the geologically active Salton Trough of Southern California. The Salton Trough represents a pull-apart basin formed by movements along major faults. This region is dominated by major strike-slip faults one of them being the San Jacinto Fault which produced the 1968 earthquake. The mainshock's epicenter was near the unincorporated community of Ocotillo Wells in San Diego County. The moment magnitude (M_{w}) 6.6 strike-slip earthquake struck with a focal depth of 11.1 km (6.9 mi). The zone of surface rupture was assigned a maximum Modified Mercalli intensity (MMI) of VII (Very strong).

Despite being the largest earthquake to strike California since the 1952 Kern County earthquake, structural damage was limited due to the region being sparsely populated. Damage mostly comprised fallen plaster from building facades and material losses. Rockfalls were widely reported in the epicenter region. There was also no deaths or injuries as a result, but minor damage occurred in Arizona and Baja California. In the aftermath, many nearby faults displayed afterslip which became the subject of scientific interest.

== Tectonic setting ==
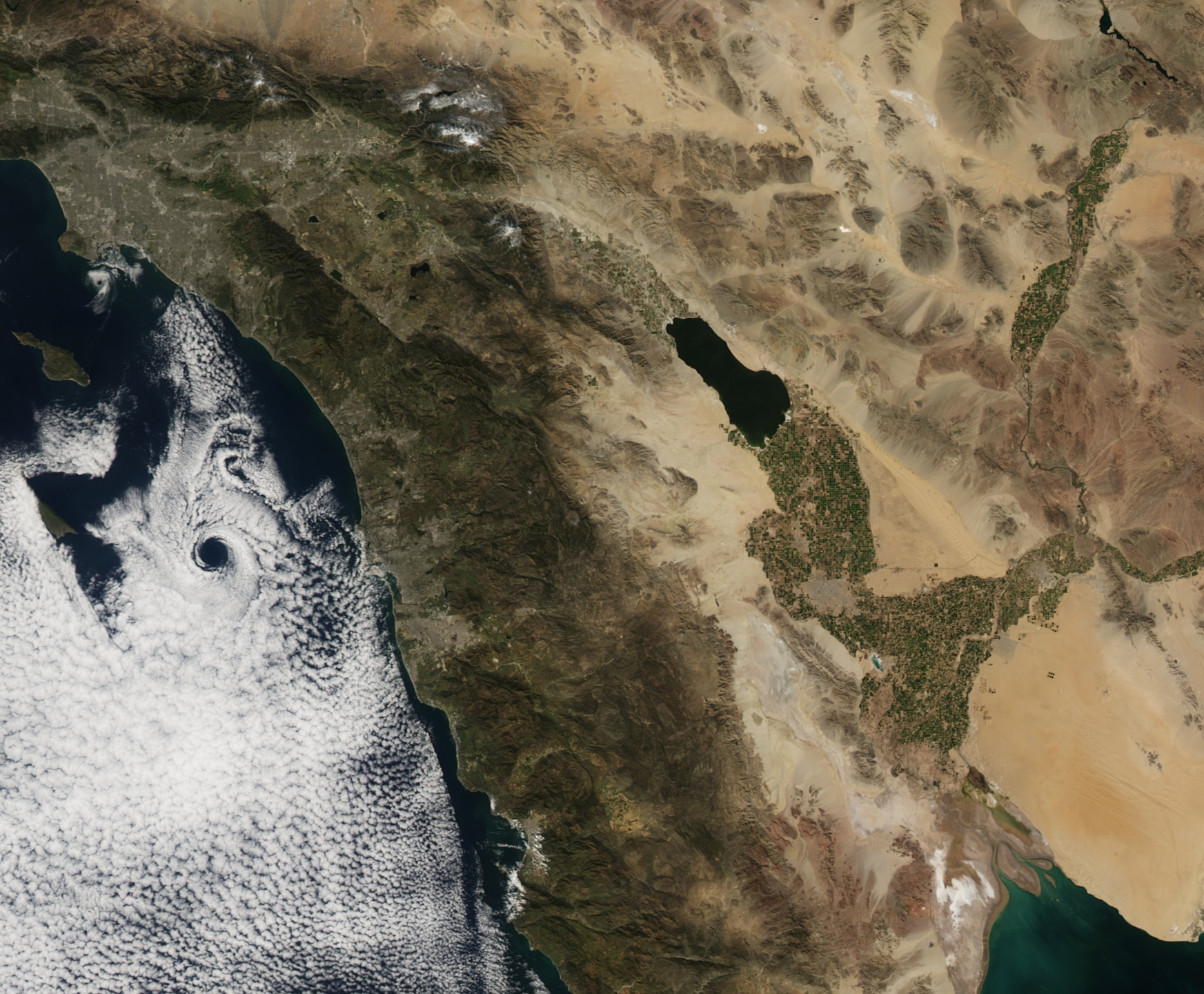
A simplified tectonic boundary map of the Salton Trough area. Red lines show major faults and arrows indicate fault motion.

The San Andreas Fault (SAF) is the main plate boundary that defines the margin between the Pacific and North American plates in California. It is believed to have formed during the Oligocene. The fault has a length of 1,200 km (750 mi), of which, it is visible for 1,005 km (624 mi) from the Salton Sea to Point Arena. Divided into four distinct segments, it displays right-lateral strike-slip movement. It accommodates 20–75 percent of plate motion between the Pacific and North American plates its segments. The tectonic boundary in Southern California is complex—plate motion is accommodated by the SAF and a network of subparallel faults. The SAF terminates at the Salton Trough, a transtensional zone (pull-apart basin) that separates it from the Imperial Fault in the south. The exact measurement of slip across faults in this zone is poorly understood.

=== California Borderland ===
West of the Salton Trough is a largely offshore fault system that accommodates approximately 20 percent of the plate motion. Faults such as the Rose Canyon Fault and the Newport-Inglewood Fault pose large risks to unprepared coastal communities such as San Diego and Los Angeles.

=== San Jacinto Fault Zone ===
East of the California Borderland, the plate boundary is a complex zone of faults that run parallel to the SAF. The two main faults are the San Jacinto Fault Zone (SJFZ) and Elsinore Fault Zone. The SJFZ is a complex, highly segmented, and overlapped fault zone that runs parallel to the San Andreas Fault, but separated by the San Jacinto Mountains. It is located on the eastern Salton Trough, and runs 290 km (180 mi) directly beneath the cities of San Bernardino, Colton, San Jacinto and Hemet. Segments of the SJFZ are given names despite being one fault system. These segments include the Coyote Creek (CCF), Superstition Hills (SHF), and Superstition Mountain (SMF) faults. The CCF is estimated to be 44 km (27 mi)-long and displays right-lateral strike-slip displacement. Considered the most active fault in Southern California, 36 notable earthquakes have been associated with it since 1857. Between 1915 and 1954, five earthquakes of magnitude 6.0 or greater were damaging. Seismic activity on the SJFZ is greater than on the SAF.

=== Eastern California Shear Zone ===
Further east, near the border with Nevada and Arizona, the Eastern California Shear Zone (ECSZ) takes up to 25 percent of the plate motion. The ECSZ consists of north–west trending right-lateral faults in the Mojave Desert, and Walker Lane, which lies at the western margin of the Basin and Range Province. Large earthquakes associated with the ECSZ occurred in 1872, 1992, 1999 and 2019.

== Earthquake ==
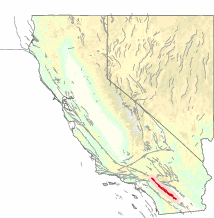
The San Jacinto Fault Zone was involved in the earthquake.

The only recorded foreshock had a magnitude of 3.7, occurring one minute before the mainshock. There was no foreshock activity recorded in the hours to weeks before the mainshock; seismic activity in the area was lower than usual in the four months before April 1968. The mainshock which measured 6.6 M_{w}, was the result of shallow strike-slip faulting which initiated from the hypocenter at 11.1 km (6.9 mi) depth. It ruptured bilaterally along the CCF and displayed an almost pure right-lateral focal mechanism. A focal mechanism analysis indicated the rupture plane had a northwest strike and dipped steeply (80°) to the south.

=== Surface rupture ===
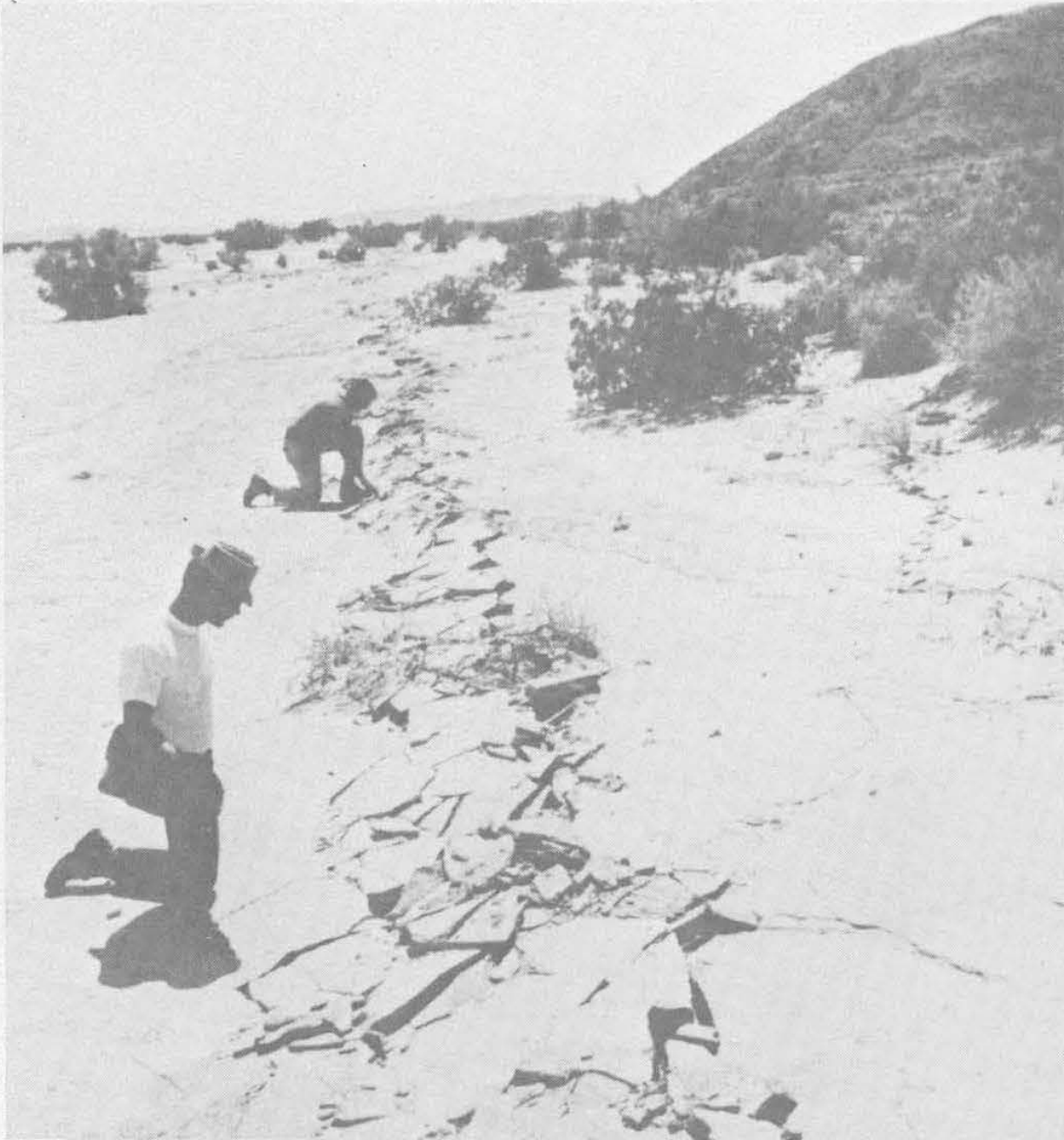
Surface rupture at the base of Borrego Mountain

A 33 km (21 mi)-long surface rupture appeared in the Quaternary alluvium and lake bed sediments. At its northern extreme, the rupture sliced through the Palm Spring Formation. The rupture zone consisted of two northwest-oriented segments, separated by a 2 km (1.2 mi)-wide discontinuity. Smaller, isolated ruptures were found 3 km (1.9 mi) away from the main trace. A maximum horizontal offset of 38 cm (15 in) was measured along the northern rupture located 5 km (3.1 mi) northwest of Ocotillo Wells, at the foothills of Borrego Mountain. Along the southern rupture, the maximum offset was 20 cm (7.9 in), measured 10 km (6.2 mi) southeast of Ocotillo Wells. Vertical offsets of up to 20 cm (7.9 in) were also recorded.

There were also left-lateral displacements 1–2 km (0.62–1.24 mi) from Ocotillo Badlands north of Highway 78 and at the northern base of Borrego Mountain. Whether these left-lateral offsets were part of the rupture mechanism or environmental changes unrelated to tectonic processes could not be determined.

=== Aftershocks ===
A year-long aftershock sequence followed; at least 135 aftershocks measuring 3.0 or greater was recorded. Most aftershocks were located 2–3 km (1.2–1.9 mi) away and subparallel to the northwest–southeast trending rupture. The mainshock epicenter was located in the middle of the aftershock zone. The concentration of aftershocks was greater southeast of the mainshock than to the northwest. These aftershocks were predominantly right-lateral strike-slip events. Several aftershocks had dip-slip focal mechanisms. There were aftershocks reported close to the SMF and SHF at the southeastern extremity of the rupture. On the day of the mainshock, a magnitude 5.2 aftershock occurred at 19:03. Forty-five minutes later, a magnitude 4.7 aftershock caused minor damage in Calexico. Nearly a year later, a 5.8 aftershock was recorded. This shock had its own sequence of aftershocks.

== Impact ==
Modified Mercalli intensities in selected locations
MMI	Locations
MMI VII (Very strong)	Ocotillo Wells, Borrego Mountain, Brea, Chula Vista, Desert Center
MMI VI (Strong)	Yuma, Mexicali, Homeland, Holtville
MMI V (Moderate)	Huntington Beach, North Hollywood, Beverly Hills, Ehrenberg, Quartzsite
MMI IV (Light)	Glendale, Tehachapi, Anaheim, Las Vegas
MMI III (Weak)–MMI II (Weak)	Fresno, Yosemite Valley, Santa Barbara, Goleta
Coffman & Cloud 1984, pp. 33–42

The maximum peak ground acceleration (pga) recorded by a seismometer at El Centro was 0.14 g. A maximum MMI of VII (Very strong) was assigned in the Borrego Mountain–Ocotillo Wells area (northeastern San Diego County) where surface rupturing occurred. Based on the study of ground effects alone, the MMI could have been IX (Violent). Severe damage was restricted to a 2,331 km^{2} (900 sq mi) area, but the earthquake was felt for 160,000 km^{2} (62,000 sq mi). In the meizoseismal area, small offsets occurred along the Coyote Creek Fault and Highway 78 near Ocotillo Wells cracked. Boulders toppled at Anza-Borrego Desert State Park and falling rocks at Split Mountain damaged many vehicles. Rockfalls also blocked the Montezuma-Borrego Highway. Rockfalls, slumps and liquefaction took place in response to the strong ground motion.

Some concrete bridge piers were cracked and fragmented. At Ocotillo Wells, a house had its walls split apart and bedroom detached from the main structure. Damage in the community was relatively minor; ground cracks appeared at the airport and roads. Residents were temporarily without water because of a damaged community well pump. A motel 4.8 km (3.0 mi) west of Ocotillo Wells sustained broken water and sewerage pipes, and cracked tiles. Large transformers 5.1 km (3.2 mi) from Ocotillo Wells were displaced, snapping their anchor bolts and X-bracings. In El Centro, plaster broke off the walls and ceilings on the second level of the Balboa Hotel. In Calexico, the ceiling at a Safeway supermarket partially collapsed. The upper brick wall of a laundromat in Westmorland collapsed while another building was cracked.

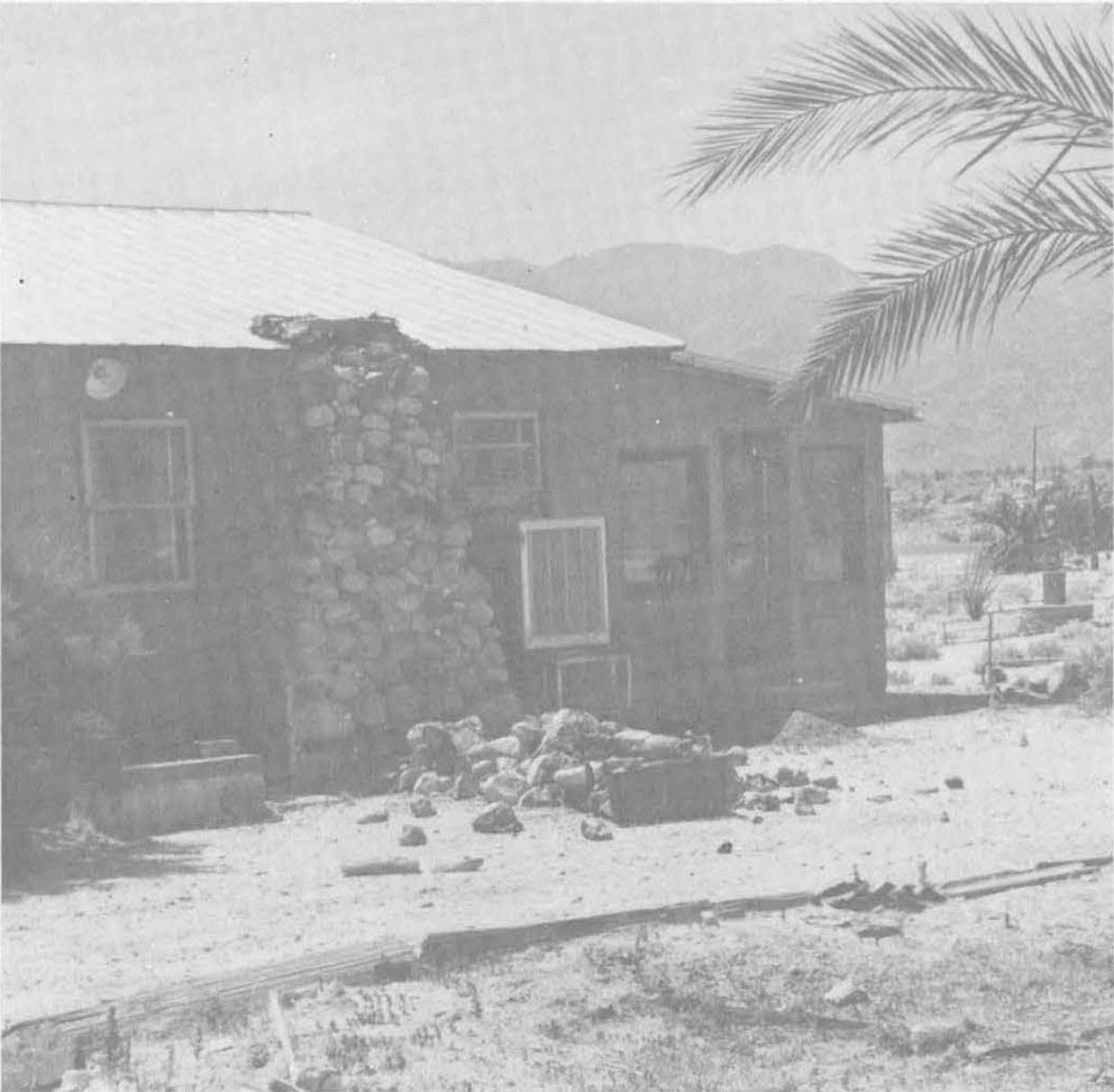
Partially collapsed chimney in Ocotillo Wells

In areas assigned MMI VI (Strong), damage was minimal due to the limited urban development. Shifting furnitures; falling objects; rocking vehicles, trees and bushes; and minor cracks were reported. Minor rockslides occurred, including some at Barrett Dam. At Borrego Springs, minor cracks appeared in a church façade, the ground, and on windows. Furniture moved several inches while and items fell off shelves in stores, forcing some to shut down. In Mecca, several concrete pipelines ruptured and a truck nearly overturned. In Anza concrete floorings cracked and plaster fell from buildings. Cracked concrete pavements and driveways occurred in Yuma and Horn, Arizona.

At San Diego, a small crack appeared in a concrete retaining wall; about 3.2 km (2.0 mi) north of downtown, furnitures were displaced. Broken windows and severed powerlines were widely reported. Cracks appeared along Sunset Cliffs Boulevard and plaster broke off buildings. Some broken windows were reported in Mexicali, Baja California. Landslides occurred at Sage while grocery stores in Riverside suffered losses from fallen bottled products. The RMS Queen Mary, which was docked at Long Beach rocked for five minutes. Cracks or broken plasters were reported in several buildings in Los Angeles.

== Post-earthquake slips ==
After the earthquake, the fault displayed a phenomenon known as aseismic creep, observed only along the central and southernmost section of the rupture. It was discovered on June 9 by the manager of a motel at Ocotillo Wells. Aseismic creep increased the total horizontal displacement from 18 cm (7.1 in) to 25–30 cm (9.8–11.8 in), and vertical displacement from 10 cm (3.9 in) to 15–23 cm (5.9–9.1 in), two months after the mainshock.

Movement along the southernmost rupture was detected from January 1969 to December 1970. There was no feasible way of measuring these new offsets as tire tracks, used for measuring, had disappeared. The post-earthquake slip produced an estimated 3–6 cm (1.2–2.4 in) of additional displacement, in addition to the 8 cm (3.1 in) during the earthquake. After a pair of earthquakes in 1987, new surface ruptures with 1.5 cm (0.59 in) of displacement were observed for 3 km (1.9 mi).

=== Triggered slips ===
Slip was also observed along faults located far from the epicenter area. The SAF, Imperial, and Superstition Hills faults displayed this phenomenon. Field observations revealed 1–2.5 cm (0.39–0.98 in) of right-lateral displacement along these faults. Triggered slip was not observed on other prominent faults such as segments of the SJFZ north of the CCF, the SMF that lies parallel to the SHF, and the Elsinore Fault Zone. Geologists postulated the slip was shaking-induced, ruling out stress transfer as a cause. Slip continued until 1972.

Evidence of movement along the Imperial Fault (70 km (43 mi) from epicenter) was discovered on April 13 on Interstate 8 when cracks appeared. However, these cracks were not well determined as there were already cracks to the road from an earthquake in March 1966 (the magnitude 3.6 earthquake is the smallest earthquake associated with a surface rupture). The Imperial Fault was the first to be discovered creeping which prompted checks on other faults. Creep occurred for 22 km (14 mi), although its actual length is unknown as dunes and urban developments obstructed any possible rupture trace. It produced an estimated 0.3 cm (0.12 in) of right-lateral slip.

Along the SHF, 2.5 cm (0.98 in) of displacement was measured at Imler Road (45 km (28 mi) from epicenter). A 23 km (14 mi) section of the SHF moved. The SHF also produced creep after the 1987 earthquakes. Movement along the Southern California segment of the SAF (50 km (31 mi) northeast of the epicenter) was documented on April 24. Right-lateral displacement of 1.3 cm (0.51 in) and vertical scarps as high as 50 cm (20 in) were measured. Slip occurred for 30 km (19 mi). The last major earthquake on this section of the SAF occurred in 1680, with an estimated magnitude of 7.8.

== See also ==
- List of earthquakes in 1968
- List of earthquakes in California
- List of earthquakes in the United States
