= 1899 San Jacinto earthquake =

Earthquake in Southern California

- UTC time: 1899-12-25 12:25:00
- USGS-ANSS: ComCat
- Local date: December 25, 1899
- Local time: 04:25
- Duration: 30 seconds
- Magnitude: 6.7 M_{w}
- Epicenter: 33.8°N 117.0°W
- Fault: San Jacinto Fault Zone
- Total damage: $50,000
- Max. intensity: MMI IX (Violent)
- Aftershocks: Yes
- Casualties: 6 dead, 8 injured

The 1899 San Jacinto earthquake occurred on Christmas morning (December 25) at 04:25 local time in Southern California. The estimated moment magnitude 6.7 earthquake had an epicenter located 10 miles southeast of San Jacinto. The earthquake had a maximum Mercalli intensity of IX (Violent). Severe damage occurred, amounting to US$50,000 (1899 rate), as well as six fatalities.

== Tectonic setting ==
The mainshock occurred on a segment of the San Jacinto Fault Zone. This highly segmented, 210-km-long strike-slip fault that forms part of the boundary between the North American and Pacific plates. The fault is part of a complex plate boundary system known as the San Andreas Fault System. It runs parallel to the San Andreas Fault, west of the Salton Sea, and is separated from the San Andreas Fault by the San Jacinto Mountains to its east. It cuts under cities including Hemet, Colton, and San Bernardino along the way, before joining the San Andreas Fault at Devore. Because the fault is so segmented, some branches have their own names, although they are considered part of the system of faults. The San Jacinto Fault is thought to be the most active fault in California. It is the source of at least 11 earthquakes measuring M_{w} 6.0 or greater since the late 19th century. The most recent earthquakes were the doublet event of 1987. The 1987 pair of temblors inflicted heavy damage to Westmorland, and indirectly killed two people outside Mexicali. Another strong earthquake struck nearby in 1968.

== Earthquake ==
The 1899 earthquake occurred on a segment of the San Jacinto Fault that also ruptured in a similar-sized quake in 1918. A study on earthquakes on the San Jacinto Fault found that the earthquakes had lowered the coulomb stress on the southern segment of the San Andreas Fault, delaying the occurrence of a large rupture. The last San Andreas Fault rupture in the region was in 1680. The San Jacinto Valley segment is believed to be the source of the 1899 earthquake. The rupture is located within the valley area, possibly on the Casa Loma strand.

== Damage ==
Lasting 30 seconds, damage was severe. Many, but not all brick buildings in the Hemet and San Jacinto were demolished. Every brick building on Main Street was extensively damaged, littering the road with bricks. Two-storey buildings lost their second floors and power lines were down. The San Jacinto County Hospital was completely unrecognizable after many of its brick walls were torn off. Despite the extent of damage, the occupants were unharmed.

In Hemet, the quake knocked off all but two chimneys. The Hemet Hotel suffered extensive damage and a veranda on the west wall was completely torn. Many bricks fell from the building and it was eventually unsafe for use. Every high school in the city was damaged, delaying school reopenings after the Christmas holidays. Brick structures suffered partial collapses while wood-constructed buildings shifted off their foundations. A 150-foot-long fissure formed beneath a house, twisting and wrenching its wooden frame. This fissure is thought to be a surface rupture of the fault. In Riverside, chimneys toppled and brick buildings suffered cracks.

In the Soboba Indian Reservation, Riverside County, six elders of the Soboba Band of Luiseño Indians were killed. A further eight were seriously injured when an adobe wall fell.

At Murrieta, the quake destroyed an adobe home. Two-thirds of the city's homes were slightly damaged. Damage was also reported in the San Bernardino-Banning area. There was some minimal damage as far away as Los Angeles and San Diego. A major landslide occurred in the San Jacinto Mountains and a rockslide at Escondido. Increased flow of water at a spring was observed at Murrieta Hot Springs and Sage, and hot springs formed at Jacumba.

The San Bernardino Transcript reported that large dust clouds formed on the San Jacinto Mountains. The forest patrol thought the clouds were from a fire but when they arrived, a large fissure six feet wide and was formed.

== See also ==
- List of earthquakes in California
- List of earthquakes in the United States
