= 1915 Imperial Valley earthquakes =

Earthquakes in California

- UTC time: 1915-06-23 03:59:00; 1915-06-23 04:56:00
- ISC event: n/a
- USGS-ANSS: ComCat; ComCat
- Local date: June 22, 1915
- Local time: 19:59 PST; 20:57 PST
- Duration: 11 seconds
- Magnitude: 6.25 M_{s}; 6.25 M_{s}
- Epicenter: 32.8°N 115.5°W
- Type: Strike-slip
- Areas affected: United States, Mexico
- Total damage: $900,000
- Max. intensity: MMI VIII (Severe)
- Foreshocks: 1 recorded
- Aftershocks: until August 1915
- Casualties: 6 dead, several injured

The 1915 Imperial Valley earthquakes were two destructive shocks centered near El Centro, California on June 22. The earthquakes measured M_{s} 6.25 and occurred nearly one hour apart at 19:59 and 20:57 PST. Both shocks were assigned VIII (Severe) on the Modified Mercalli intensity scale. Heavy damage occurred in the areas of Mexicali and El Centro, amounting to $900,000. At least six people were killed in the earthquakes.

In November, the area was struck by another larger shock, measuring M_{w} 7.0 centered in Cerro Prieto, Baja California, Mexico.

== Tectonic setting ==
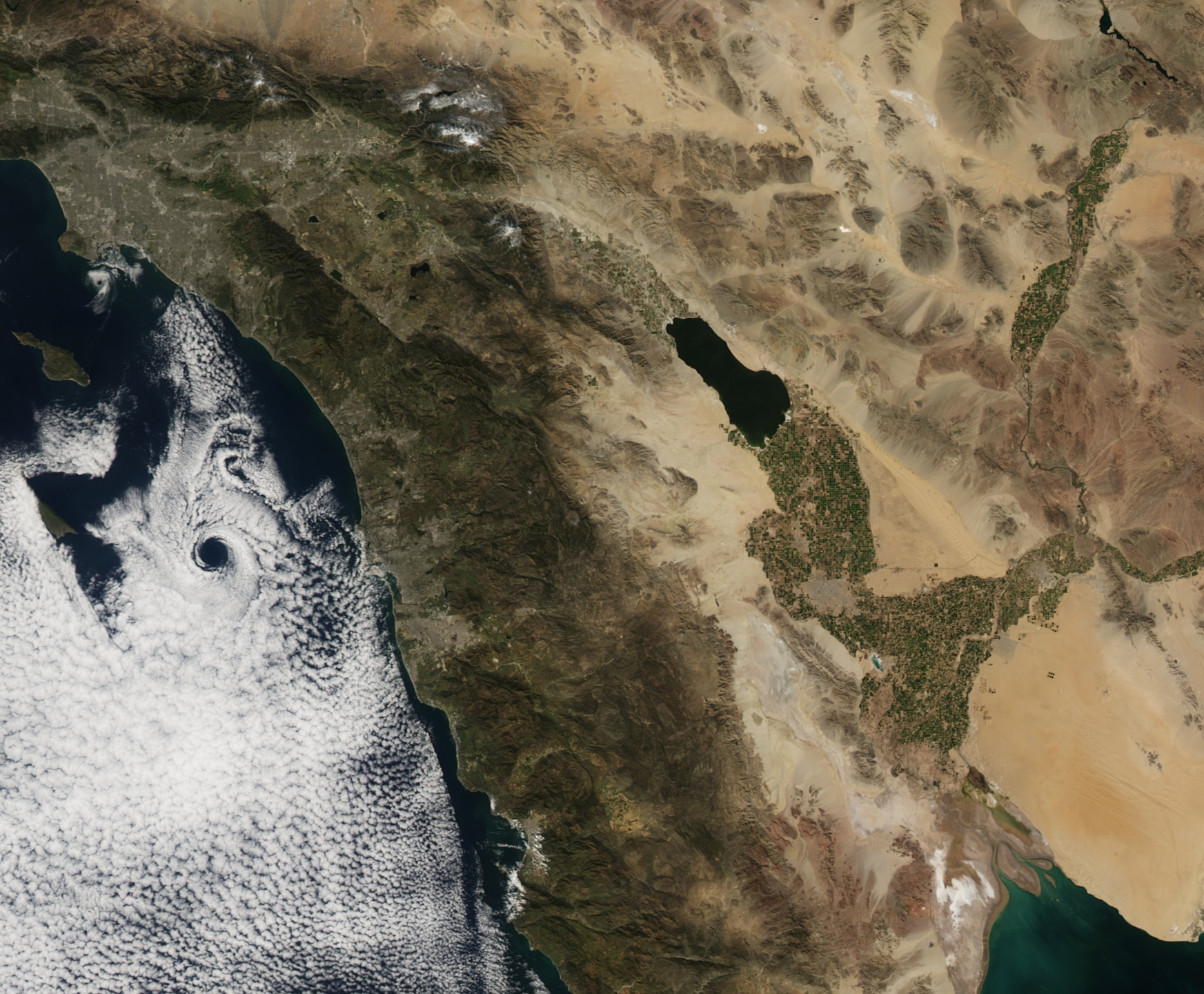
Brawley Seismic Zone and surrounding area. The red lines are simplified faults. Right-lateral direction of motion of the transform fault is shown (pink arrows). The red rhombs are pull-apart basins; the northern one is the site of the Niland geothermal field, the southern the Cerro Prieto geothermal field.

The Salton Trough is an active pull-apart basin forming due to offsets between the numerous strike-slip faults along its edges. It is a component of the much bigger San Andreas Fault System, joining the San Andreas Fault with the Imperial Fault Zone via the Brawley seismic zone. The San Andreas Fault is the main plate boundary that defines the margin between the Pacific and North American plates in California. However, the plate boundary is slightly more complex; rather than a single fault structure that makes up the boundary, the region is straddled and crisscrossed with numerous shorter faults to accommodate the movement of these two plates.

The Imperial Fault Zone is a 69-km-long right-lateral strike-slip fault located near the cities of Brawley, Imperial, El Centro, Calexico and Mexicali. The fault is seismically active and was responsible for two damaging earthquakes in 1940 and 1979. In 1966, it produced a magnitude 3.6 earthquake that caused a surface rupture, making it the smallest earthquake associated with such a feature. Earthquakes on the Imperial Fault Zone have a recurrence interval of ~30 years, but larger events like the 1940 M_{w} 6.9 earthquake occur every 700 years.

== June events ==
The earthquakes may have ruptured the northern segment of the Imperial Fault Zone. No surface ruptures have been associated with the earthquakes, and very little is known about the seismic activity of the fault prior to 1940.

=== Damage ===
Both shocks were equally severe; around the areas of El Centro and Calexico, buildings were heavily damaged, chimneys collapsed, and walls fell over. The first shock lasted 11 seconds and was strong enough to stop clocks and weaken many buildings in the Imperial Valley. Many people evacuated from their homes and other buildings to stay in the streets. When the second shock came, it caused unreinforced masonry structures to partially collapse, injuring some inhabitants. People who reentered structurally weakened buildings after the first shock were injured during the second. In Mexicali, night entertainment was at its peak hour, so people continued to be entertained even after the first shock. The collapse of walls and falling debris killed six people when the second quake struck.

The worst damage occurred at El Centro at an estimated $600,000. Serious damage was reported in Calexico, Heber, and Mexicali, but the economic losses were fewer because El Centro was a much bigger community. Nearly every brick building in the area were damaged, due to poor construction methods which could not withstand the earthquakes' intensity. The two mainshocks were felt as far as San Bernardino and Los Angeles in the north, to Parker and Yuma, Arizona in the east, and south; in Ensenada, and likely beyond.

Some fissures were observed in an alluvium fan. Water irrigation installations had minor damage. Riverbanks of the Alamo and New rivers slumped into the stream. At a marsh on the New River, cracks formed. Residents in Mexico reported plumes of steam emitted from a group of mud volcanoes. Sounds of explosions were also heard. Many aftershocks were felt; continuing into August 1915.

== November event ==
The November 21 M_{w} 7.0 earthquake occurred in Baja California, Mexico. The earthquake was assigned IX (Violent) on the Modified Mercalli intensity scale. It was associated with a rupture on the Cerro Prieto Fault near a volcano of the same name. Widespread ground slumping, landslides, and liquefaction was reported around Cerro Prieto volcano, 20 km south of the epicenter. The rupture initiated on the fault and propagated bilaterally for a total length of 32 km.

The earthquake caused little damage and no casualties. Plumes of steam up to 200 meters in height were reported in Laguna de los Volcanoes, an uninhabitated area. A massive fissure was reported on both sides of the New River for a length of 3 km. Two individuals at Laguna de los Volcanoes recounted that it was difficult to stand during the earthquake. A levee was damaged.

== See also ==
- List of earthquakes in 1915
- List of earthquakes in California
- List of earthquakes in the United States
