= Brawley Seismic Zone =

North American extensional tectonic zone

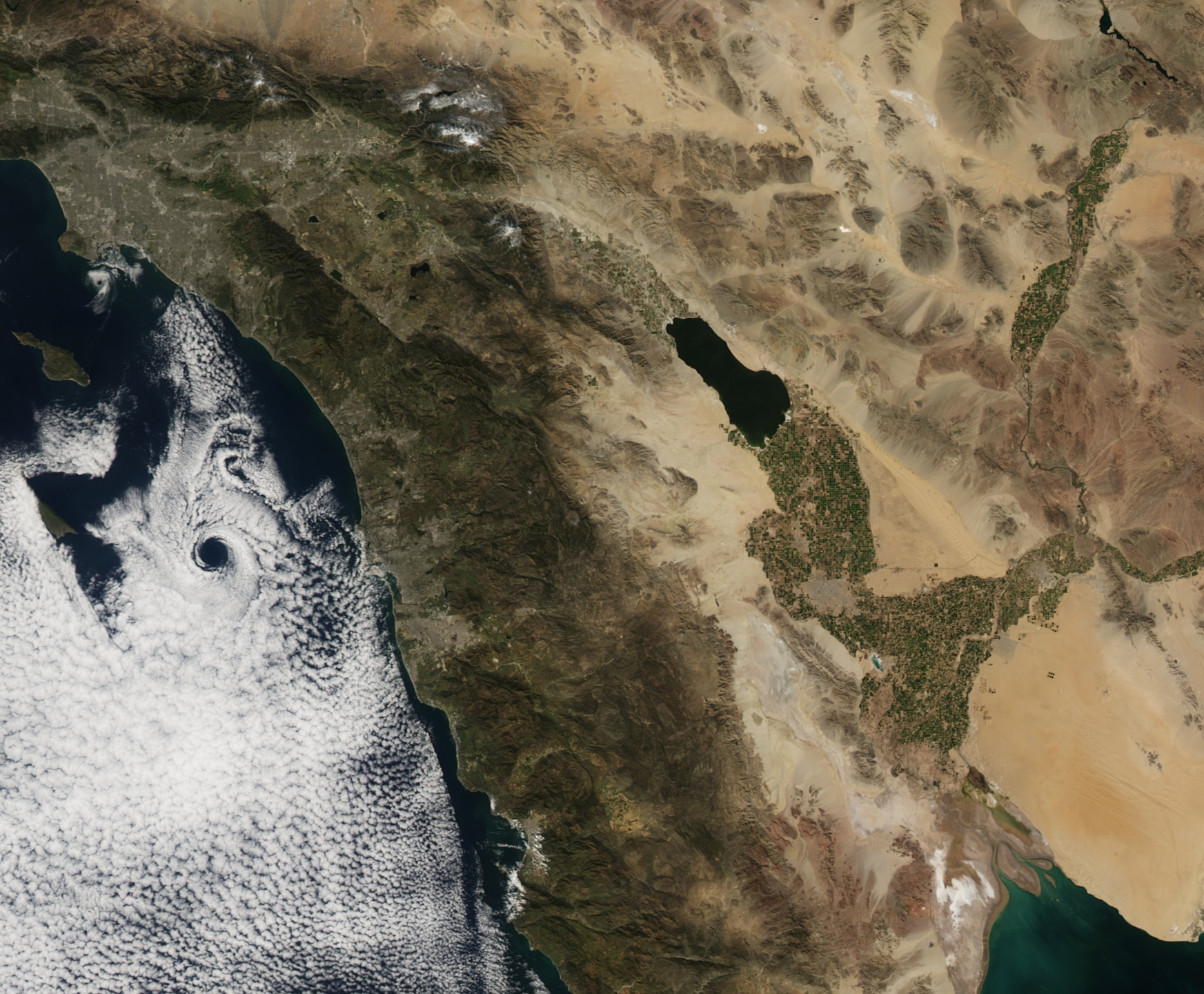
Brawley Seismic Zone and surrounding area. The red lines are simplified faults. Right-lateral direction of motion of the transform fault is shown (pink arrows). The red rhombs are pull-apart basins; the northern one is the site of the Niland geothermal field, the southern the Cerro Prieto geothermal field.

The Brawley Seismic Zone (BSZ), also known as the Brawley fault zone, is a predominantly extensional tectonic zone that connects the southern terminus of the San Andreas Fault with the Imperial Fault in Southern California. The BSZ is named for the nearby town of Brawley in Imperial County, California, and the seismicity there is characterized by earthquake swarms.

== Geology ==
The Brawley Seismic Zone represents the northernmost extension of the spreading center axis associated with the East Pacific Rise which runs up the axis of the Gulf of California and is in the process of rifting the Baja California peninsula away from the mainland of Mexico, with significant subsidence taking place at southern California's Salton Sea and at Laguna Salada in Baja California. Other major locations along the axis include the Cerro Prieto spreading center located south of Mexicali, and Wagner Basin (a submarine depression in the Gulf of California).

The Salton Buttes on the south shore of the Salton Sea are on the north margin of the Brawley Seismic Zone and are linked to volcanic and geothermal activity within the zone. The Brawley Seismic Zone has been interpreted as an "onshore spreading center" which runs diagonally across the Salton Trough.

== Earthquake swarms ==
On August 26, 2012, near Brawley, a swarm of more than 300 small to moderate earthquakes occurred with the largest two reaching a maximum of 5.3 and 5.5. Some light cosmetic damage was found on some older buildings in downtown Brawley. Earthquake swarms are not unusual for the area. In 2005, also near Brawley, there was a swarm with a peak magnitude of 5.1, while in 1981 a swarm included one quake which was measured at 5.8. The swarm activity is not understood completely, but the new restlessness could generate data that will help scientists to gain a better understanding of the region. According to a geologist at the United States Geological Survey (USGS), such swarms are typical for the Brawley zone: "The area sees lots of events at once, with many close to the largest magnitude, rather than one main shock with several much smaller aftershocks."

== Other activity ==
The Imperial Valley of southern California experiences high rates of seismicity with a pronounced portion of the activity occurring within the Brawley Seismic Zone that separates the San Andreas fault to the north and the Imperial fault to the south. The Imperial fault was the source of the 1940 El Centro earthquake and the 1979 Imperial Valley earthquake. There was more than 30 km (19 mi) of surface rupture associated with the 1979 event along the northwest trending Imperial fault from just north of the Mexico–United States border to an area south of Brawley and the BSZ was found to have ruptured, with surface cracks, for a length of 13 km (8.1 mi). The 1940 and 1979 mainshocks were of similar size and both were followed by damaging aftershocks near Brawley.
