= San Jacinto Fault Zone =

Southern Californian fault zone

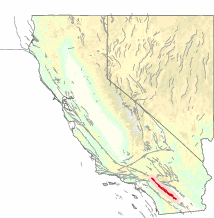
Map showing the San Jacinto Fault Zone outlined in red

The San Jacinto Fault Zone (SJFZ) is a major strike-slip fault zone that runs through San Bernardino, Riverside, San Diego, and Imperial Counties in Southern California. The SJFZ is a component of the larger San Andreas transform system and is considered to be the most seismically active fault zone in the area. Together they relieve the majority of the stress between the Pacific and North American tectonic plates.

The SJFZ itself consists of many individual fault segments, some of which have only been individualized as recently as the 1980s, but activity along the line of faults has been documented since the 1890s. One segment of the SJFZ, the Anza seismic gap, has not experienced any major activity since instrumental records have been kept. Each segment was evaluated for its seismic risk and was assigned a probability for the occurrence of a large rupture for the thirty-year period starting in 1995.

While several of the large earthquakes along the SJFZ have not resulted in significant property damage or loss of life (due to their remote location) the cities of Hemet and San Jacinto were both heavily damaged in two significant events in 1899 and 1918. The recurrence interval for a series of large earthquakes starting in 1899 (including the 5.9 1937 Terwilliger Valley earthquake) was 18, 5, 14, 5, 12, 14, and 19 years, yet there has not been a strong earthquake for 38 years (since the 1987 Superstition Hills and Elmore Ranch sequence).

== Characteristics ==
The San Jacinto Fault Zone and the San Andreas Fault (SAF) accommodate up to 80% of the slip rate between the North American and Pacific plates. The extreme southern portion of the SAF has experienced two moderate events in historical times, while the SJFZ is one of California's most active fault zones and has repeatedly produced both moderate and large events. The locations of earthquakes before the 1954 Arroyo Salada earthquake are not precisely known, but the events' effects place them on the SJFZ and not on the SAF. The 1923 North San Jacinto Fault earthquake struck the Inland Empire area of southern California at a time of relatively low population, and a repeat event in modern times would result in heavy property damage and loss of life.

Segment	Length	Last rupture
San Bernardino	35 km	1890
San Jacinto	42 km	1918
Anza	90 km	1750
Coyote Creek	40 km	1892
Borrego Mtn	29 km	1968
Superstition Mtn	23 km	1430
Superstition Hills	22 km	1987
WGCEP 1995, pp. 386, 387

=== Segments ===
A 1995 report by the Working Group on California Earthquake Probabilities identified seven individual segments of the SJFZ. The group consisted of more than three dozen seismologists, including Keiiti Aki and C. Allin Cornell, and was organized by the Southern California Earthquake Center for the USGS and the California Office of Emergency Services. The 1995 paper was the third in a series of reports that was set in motion following the 1992 Landers earthquake in southern California with the intention of updating the data and the approach for calculating the probabilities for large earthquakes along the southern San Andreas and San Jacinto Fault zones. Both these fault zones were grouped together as having adequate paleoseismic data to assign conditional probabilities for future damaging earthquakes.

The original Working Group in 1988 had identified five segments of the fault zone. From north to south, the segments were labeled the San Bernardino Valley, San Jacinto Valley, Anza, Borrego Mountain, and Superstition Hills. The 1995 group then added the Coyote Creek and Superstition Mountain segments, defined the Anza segment to include the Clark and Casa Loma faults, and updated the slip rates for each segment. The three northern sections (San Bernardino, San Jacinto, and Anza) were assigned 12 mm per year of slip and the four remaining sections were given 4 mm of slip, and error rates were half the total estimated slip for each segment (±6 mm and ±2 mm respectively) with the exception of the Anza segment which had slightly exaggerated rates of +7 mm and −5 mm.

Thirty year probabilities for segment-rupturing earthquakes were estimated using three separate models then a preferred weighted result was presented for each segment. While the San Bernardino (37%) and San Jacinto (43%) segments both saw large increases since the 1988 report, due in part to increased estimates for slip rates and decreased estimates for inherent displacement, the Anza segment (17%) was determined to have a decreased probability, based on an increased segment length. The Coyote Creek (18%), Superstition Mountain (9%), and Superstition Hills (2%) segments received first time estimates (none were assigned in 1988) and the Borrego Mountain segment received a more specific value of 6%.

==== San Bernardino Valley ====
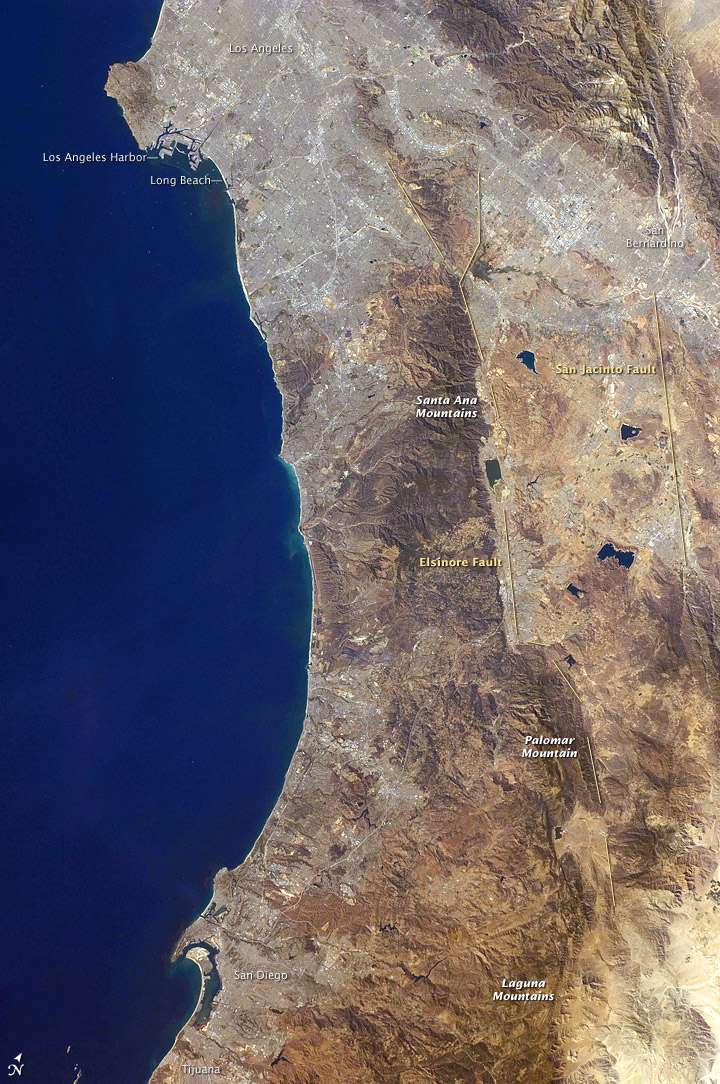
California Coast, Los Angeles to San Diego Bay. Overlaid lines on this NASA photo (2008) identify the San Jacinto Fault Zone (right) parallel to the Elsinore Fault (left)

The northernmost primary strand of the SJFZ is the Claremont strand (though subsidiary parallel strands exist). It spans a total of 75 km (47 mi), from its northern endpoint in Cajon Pass to its southern endpoint in the San Jacinto Valley. Within the San Bernardino Valley itself, the SJFZ approaches or intersects the right-lateral strike-slip San Andreas Fault to the north, the oblique normal Crafton Hills Fault Zone to the east, and the Cucamonga Thrust to the west. A series of moderate earthquakes affected this area in the 1890s, though it is uncertain how many of these occurred specifically on the SJFZ. The Claremont strand has not had a major earthquake in the instrumental period, but paleoseismology indicates that its last surface rupturing event occurred in the early 19th century, and that comparable earthquakes occur on average of every 160 to 220 years.

==== San Jacinto Valley ====
The San Jacinto Valley is a 25 km long, ~4 km wide valley that was formed by extension in a region of overlap between two major parallel strands of the SJFZ. The valley is bounded by the Claremont strand to the northwest (see above) and the 25 km long Casa Loma strand to the southeast. The Clark strand, which is separated from the Casa Loma by a small compressional step in the city of Hemet, continues southeastward out of the valley. This area was heavily damaged by the historic earthquakes of 1899 and 1918. The 1899 event is thought to have occurred within the valley, likely on the Casa Loma strand, while the 1918 event has been identified on the Clark strand between Hemet and Anza.

==== Anza ====
While the 1988 Working Group included the Clark, Coyote Creek, and Buck Ridge faults, the 1995 Working Group limited the segment to just the 90 km (56 mi) Clark fault. A paleoseismic investigation on this segment at Hog Lake indicated three historical surface-rupturing events occurred around 1210, 1530, and 1750 with an average recurrence period for a magnitude 7.0–7.5 earthquake of 250 years.

==== Coyote Creek ====
With a recurrence period of 175 (+158 / -95) years, no surface-rupturing event has occurred on this 40 km (25 mi) segment since 1892.

==== Borrego Mountain ====
The extent of this segment is based on the surface rupture of the 1968 Borrego Mountain earthquake and shares a recurrence interval of 175 years.

==== Superstition Hills ====
The 1988 Working Group defined the segment as two parallel strands, the Superstition Hills and Superstition Mountain faults, though no slip rate or recurrence interval was known. On November 23, 1987, the Working Group determined that the available information was still not adequate to assign 30-year probabilities. On November 24, 1987, the fault ruptured, along with an unknown fault (later named the Elmore Ranch fault). Kenneth W. Hudnut and Kerry Sieh examined the surface rupture (along with a trench investigation) in 1989 and estimated the slip rate for the prior 330 years to be 2 – 6 mm/yr (±1 mm). The Working Group used these new figures to assign a slip rate of 4 ±2 mm/yr with an average recurrence interval of 250 (+400 / -133) years for the segment.

==== Superstition Mountains ====
Three surface-faulting events were found to have occurred along this newly added segment. A trench investigation by Larry Gurrola and Thomas Rockwell near the north shore of ancient Lake Cahuilla dated the events to 885–1440. The slip rate for the Borrego mountain segment (4 ± 2mm/yr) was extrapolated for use along the segment and a recurrence interval of 340 years was established.

=== Anza seismic gap ===
With at least six and as many as ten large events since 1890, the right-lateral strike-slip SJFZ is southern California's most restless fault, with the exception of several sections which have seen less frequent activity. In a 1975 study, one of these (a 40 km (25 mi) stretch) was labeled the "Anza to Coyote Mountain slip gap", and was further refined in a 1984 paper by seismologists Christopher Sanders and Hiroo Kanamori to include only a smaller 20 km (12 mi) section near the town of Anza. By studying several moderate events (and their aftershocks) that occurred in 1967 (4.7_{L}), 1975 (4.8_{L}), and 1980 (5.5_{L}), Sanders and Kanamori determined the seismogenic but locked nature of the gap. Were the entire fault segment to rupture in a single event, this newly modified length limited the potential of the segment to generate a magnitude 6.5 earthquake, similar in size to previous events along the SJFZ. However, if the slip were to extend out of the Anza area, the earthquake could be up to, but not larger than 7.0 in magnitude.

=== Link to San Andreas Fault ===
At least six large ruptures of the San Jacinto Fault Zone are known to have followed the 1857 Fort Tejon earthquake that ruptured the central segment of the San Andreas Fault. These events began with the 1899 San Jacinto earthquake and occurred at intermittent intervals culminating with the 1987 Superstition Hills and Elmore Ranch events. The 1857 rupture spanned a total of 360 kilometers (220 mi) and terminated on the southeast end near the point where the San Jacinto Fault Zone branches away from the San Andreas Fault Zone at the Cajon Pass. In a paper published in the journal Science, Christopher Sanders plotted the earthquakes of the SJFZ by time and location and found that a uniform pattern became apparent. Moving southeastward from the Cajon Pass, the large SJFZ events appear on a line with a slope of 1.7 km per year and Sanders hypothesized that the 1857 earthquake introduced a strain pulse that migrated southeast and triggered large earthquakes as it traversed the SJFZ at that rate.

== Earthquakes ==
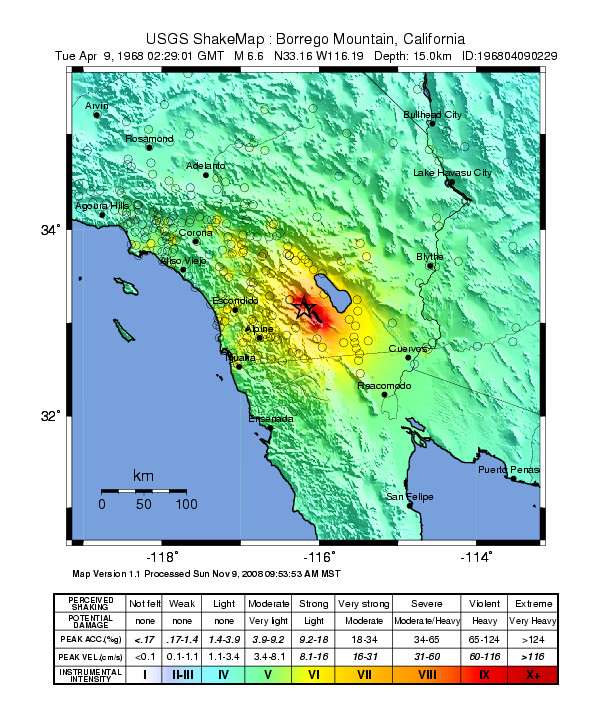
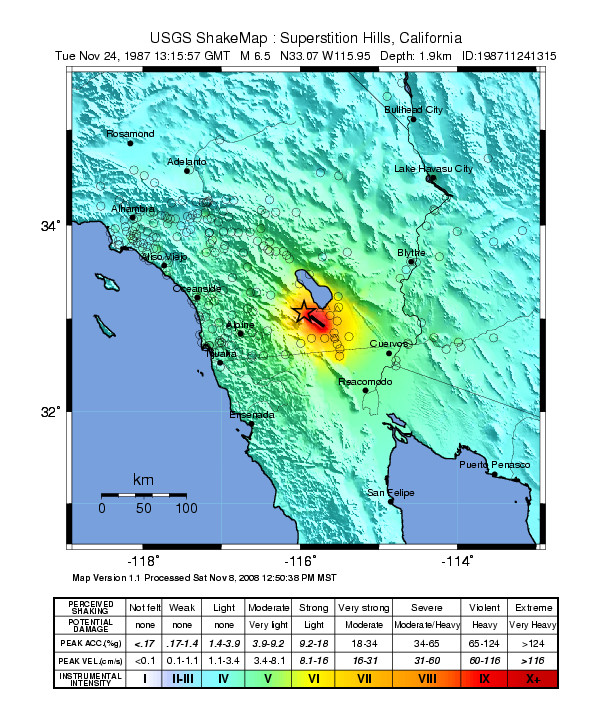
USGS ShakeMaps for the 1968 Borrego Mountain earthquake (left) and the second (stronger) mainshock in the November 1987 sequence

=== 1812 San Juan Capistrano earthquake ===
Uncertainty surrounds the details of this earthquake but recent studies suggest that a joint rupture of both the SAF and the San Jacinto Fault Zone to the southeast more closely match the damage pattern recorded about this event.

=== 1899 San Jacinto earthquake ===
On December 25, with a maximum intensity of MM IX, this magnitude 6.6 earthquake destroyed San Jacinto and Hemet and six were killed by adobe walls that collapsed at Soboba (just east of San Jacinto). A 46 m (151 ft) fissure, which may have been surface rupture of the San Jacinto Fault, ran under a house that was severely damaged near Hemet. The effects of the early morning earthquake were severe. Not all the buildings in San Jacinto were completely destroyed by the thirty seconds of shaking, but most of the brick buildings' second floors were heavily damaged. (33.8°N 117.0°W)

=== 1968 Borrego Mountain earthquake ===
On April 9, a magnitude 6.4 M_{L} earthquake with a maximum perceived intensity of MM VII hit the extreme eastern San Diego County area and created a 31 km (19 mi) surface break along the Coyote Creek Fault. California State Route 78 was damaged with cracks near Ocotillo Wells and large boulders blocked the Montezuma-Borrego Springs Highway. Other rockslides occurred at Palm Canyon and Split Mountain in Anza-Borrego Desert State Park. One house was split apart in Ocotillo Wells with one bedroom becoming detached from the rest of the home. The mainshock was felt in Arizona and Nevada and the largest aftershock damaged a theater's walls in Calexico near the Mexico–United States border.

According to a report in the Los Angeles Times, this was the strongest earthquake to affect southern California since the Tehachapi earthquake fifteen years earlier. Taller buildings swayed in both Los Angeles and San Diego and power outages affected numerous areas, primarily in the cities of Imperial Valley. Power failures along with disruption to telephone service caused problems in the Hemet Valley area, and smaller power outages in Los Angeles and Orange Counties also occurred. A brick wall collapsed at a laundromat in Westmorland (in the El Centro Metropolitan Area) but no one was injured, and in the seaside neighborhoods of San Diego county several hundred windows were broken. Charles Richter, a Caltech seismologist, stated that the earthquake was centered near Ocotillo Wells about 120 mi (190 km) southeast of Los Angeles. The mainshock occurred at 6:28 pm and aftershocks continued through the evening, but were tapering off by 10 pm. (33.2°N 116.1°W)

=== 1987 Superstition Hills earthquakes ===
Two earthquakes in late November caused property damage totaling three million in Imperial County. The two events were separated by eleven hours and were located in the western Imperial Valley on the Superstition Hills Fault and a previously unknown fault. Damage in Westmoreland, Imperial, and El Centro consisted of collapsed chimneys, broken windows, and damaged highways. The Worthington Road bridge, at the New River, failed due to liquefaction and at the Desert Test Range Control Center, water tanks toppled into the building and other equipment crashed through a window. Activities were suspended there for several days due to the damage. The Southern California Irrigation District estimated damage to be $600,000 – $750,000. The initial shock produced a small amount of deformation in the canal's liner while the second main shock caused considerable damage to thousands of feet of canal lining in the northwest section of the valley.

Several foreshocks preceded the main shocks and a series of aftershocks included two in the range of magnitude five. On the Mexican side of the border, 50 injuries and two deaths were reported, and 44 were treated for their injuries in California. According to the spokesperson for the state of Baja California, a motor vehicle accident east of Mexicali that claimed the lives of a mother and her four-year-old son was blamed on the earthquake. Thomas H. Heaton, a USGS seismologist, stated that the faults in the area are difficult to track down because of the sediment deposited in the valley, which had been an intermittent drainage basin of the Colorado River.

The Superstition Hills fault (SHF) lies between the Coyote Creek fault that ruptured during the 1968 event and the Imperial Fault that ruptured during the 1940 El Centro earthquake and the 1979 Imperial Valley earthquake. To the northeast are several cross faults that trend northeast. One of these faults ruptured during a large aftershock of the 1979 event and another slipped as the smaller of the two shocks during the November 1987 sequence. The first shock (on what became known as the Elmore Ranch fault) measured 6.2 M_{s} and the shock 11.4 hours later on the SHF measured 6.6 M_{s}. (33.1°N 115.8°W & 33.0°N 115.8°W)

== See also ==
- List of earthquakes in California
