= Steven Kilston =

Steven D. Kilston (born 1944) is an American astronomer.

Kilston received a B.A. from Harvard University in 1965 and a Ph.D. from UCLA in 1973. He was Carl Sagan's first undergraduate research student at Harvard, co-authoring "A Search for Life on Earth at Kilometer Resolution". Kilston worked for the Hughes Aircraft Company, the Lockheed Corporation, and Ball Aerospace. He was the principal designer of the Ikonos satellite.

In 1966, he discovered the Comet Kilston at Lick Observatory.

In 1983, Kilston published a paper in Nature with Leon Knopoff, suggesting that earthquakes were linked to an "alignment of the sun and moon on opposite sides of the Earth that tugged the opposite sides of faults in opposing directions". They successfully predicted the 1987 Superstition Hills earthquakes.

Kilston has envisioned a "Plausible Path to the Stars", in which a spaceship carrying a million inhabitants could reach the few dozen nearest stars in 10,000 years' time.
