= Leon Knopoff =

American geophysicist and musicologist

Leon Knopoff (July 1, 1925 – January 20, 2011) was an American geophysicist and musicologist. He received his education at Caltech, graduating in 1949 with a PhD in physics, and came to UCLA the following year. He served on the UCLA faculty for 60 years. His research interests spanned a wide variety of fields and included the physics and statistics of earthquakes, earthquake prediction, the interior structure of the Earth, plate tectonics, pattern recognition, non-linear earthquake dynamics and several other areas of solid Earth geophysics. He also made contributions to the fields of musical perception and archaeology.

In 1983, Knopoff published a paper in Nature with Steven Kilston, suggesting that earthquakes were linked to an "alignment of the sun and moon on opposite sides of the Earth that tugged the opposite sides of faults in opposing directions". They successfully predicted the 1987 Superstition Hills earthquakes.

== Honors and awards ==
- Fellow of the American Geophysical Union, 1962.
- Elected to the National Academy of Sciences, 1963.
- Fellow of the American Association for the Advancement of Science, 1964.
- Fellow of the American Academy of Arts and Sciences, 1965.
- Fellow of the Guggenheim Foundation, 1976.
- Recipient of the Gold Medal of the Royal Astronomical Society, 1979.
- Medal of the Seismological Society of America, 1990.
- Member of the American Philosophical Society, 1992.
