= 1987 Superstition Hills earthquakes =

Earthquakes in California and Baja California

- UTC time: 1987-11-24 01:54:14; 1987-11-24 13:15:56
- ISC event: 453653; 453722
- USGS-ANSS: ComCat; ComCat
- Local date: November 23, 1987; November 24, 1987
- Local time: 17:54 PST; 05:15 PST
- Magnitude: 6.0 M_{w}; 6.5 M_{w}
- Depth: 2.3 km (1.4 mi); 7.5 km (4.7 mi)
- Epicenter: 33.090°N 115.792°W
- Type: Strike-slip
- Areas affected: California and Mexico
- Total damage: US$3 million
- Max. intensity: MMI VI (Strong) MMI VII (Very strong)
- Casualties: 2 dead, 94 injured

The 1987 Superstition Hills earthquake affected the Imperial Valley of California and Baja California on November 24, nearly 12 hours after a M_{w} 6.0 foreshock, called the Elmore Ranch earthquake. The mainshock, measuring M_{w} 6.5, struck at 17:54 PST, along the Superstition Hills segment of the San Jacinto Fault Zone. The earthquake generated a 27 km (17 mi) surface rupture with additional postseismic slip continuing for a year.

The earthquake caused damage amounting to US$3 million. Damage was considerable in Mexicali, where two people died and 50 were injured. Another 44 people were injured in the Imperial Valley. Buildings in El Centro, Imperial, and Westmorland sustained collapsed chimneys, ruptured pipes, and shattered windows. The rebuilt Imperial County services building, which replaced an originally five-story structure, remained structurally intact. Damage to canal infrastructure cost over US$600 thousand.

== Geology ==
The Imperial Valley is a seismically active area in California where the San Andreas Fault and San Jacinto Fault Zone (SJFZ) discontinues. This region represents a transition zone between continental transform faulting and oceanic rifting in the Gulf of California. South of the San Andreas Fault and between the Imperial Fault is the Brawley seismic zone—the northernmost ridge feature in the ridge–transform boundary. Faults in the Brawley Seismic Zone typically trend northeast, perpendicular to the plate boundary faults. Labeled "cross-faults", these are oriented perpendicular to the direction of rifting and were previously interpreted to be normal faults. However, recent seismic activity shows that these faults produce left-lateral strike-slip motion.

The SJFZ is a 244 km (152 mi)-long right-lateral structure that runs parallel to the San Andreas Fault. The SJFZ is southern California's most seismically active fault zone. It was responsible for a large surface-rupturing earthquake in 1968. The fault zone is highly segmented, consisting of seven individually named segments. Although part of one fault system, these segments are assigned names such as the Coyote Creek, Superstition Hills, and Superstition Mountain faults. The Superstition Hills Fault (SHF) is a vertically dipping, 38 km (24 mi)-long section. In 1956, it produced a small surface rupture during a M_{L} 5.6 earthquake. Triggered slip also occurred during earthquakes in 1968 and 1979. The SHF was not known to be capable of producing large earthquakes prior to 1987 although it may have been the source of earthquakes in 1906 and 1915. However, other faults were also candidates for producing these earthquakes.

== Earthquakes ==
=== Elmore Ranch earthquake ===
The M_{w} 6.0 foreshock struck at a depth of 2.3 km (1.4 mi), at 17:54 PST. The epicenter was located 22.5 km (14.0 mi) southwest of Westmorland, in a sparsely populated area. It occurred on a previously unmapped fault, later called the Elmore Ranch Fault Zone (ERFZ). The aftershocks from this event implied that rupture occurred along a northeast striking fault based on its distribution. The fault ruptured bilaterally for 20–25 km (12–16 mi) in a northeast towards the Brawley Seismic Zone and southwest, where it joined the SHF. A surface rupture was only observed for half the rupture length and was associated with left-lateral slip with a maximum offset of nearly 20 cm (7.9 in). Between 2.8 cm (1.1 in) and 4.8 cm (1.9 in) of slip was measured on the Lone Tree, Kane Springs, and Eastern Kane Springs segments of the ERFZ, while the main ERFZ strand had a measured displacement of 13 cm (5.1 in).

=== Superstition Hills earthquake ===
A M_{w} 6.5 occurred at 7.5 km (4.7 mi) depth, 12 hours later, with an epicenter at the northwestern termination of the SHF, where it intersects the ERFZ. Its aftershocks illuminated a zone roughly parallel to the SHF, although situated several kilometers southwest of the main rupture trace. The shock caused 27 km (17 mi) of surface rupture running southeastward from the epicenter. Right-lateral offsets were observed along two sections of the SHF and on 4 km (2.5 mi) of the Wienert Fault.

Over 339 days, the SHF continued to produce aseismic slip, increasing the ground displacements. By August 1988, up to 80.2 cm (31.6 in) of offset was measured along the SHF, with much of the slip occurring within the first five days of the mainshock. At the time of observation in 1988, the Wienert Fault's southern portion produced vertical offsets of 25 cm (9.8 in) and was actively increasing.

The mainshock also triggered slip on the central section of the Coyote Creek Fault, north of the SHF. The 3 km (1.9 mi) rupture comprised two semi-continuous segments. It had a maximum right-lateral slip of 1.5 cm (0.59 in), and minor vertical offsets were also recorded. Installed creepmeters indicated several millimeters of slip occurred on the San Andreas Fault, but this was insufficient to create a surface rupture. One of these instrument recorded 0.69–0.76 cm (0.27–0.30 in) of slip. Triggered slip was also measured on the Imperial Fault. Movements on these faults may have initiated less than three minutes after the two large earthquakes. The Imperial Fault also produced motion about three hours following the mainshock.

=== Ground motion ===
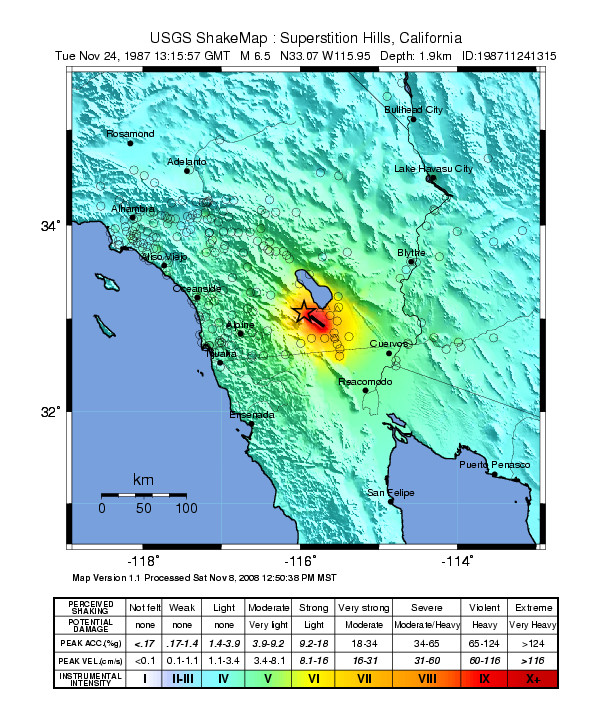
A USGS ShakeMap for the November 24 mainshock

A strong motion network was established by the United States Coast and Geodetic Survey in 1932 to record strong-motion data across the western United States. In the Imperial Valley, an accelerograph was installed at El Centro recorded data for the earthquakes of 1940 and 1987. By 1979, the network expanded to 30 stations in the valley, and nearly 700 strong motion accelerograms were gathered from earthquakes by 1987.

The 1987 events produced 65 recordings from 40 stations across the valley. The horizontal peak ground accelerations (pga) during the foreshock exceeded 0.1 g at six stations. The nearest station at Superstition Mountain was 13 km (8.1 mi) away, recording a pga of 0.13 g. Meanwhile, the highest pga was 0.22 g, measured at Calipatria, 26 km (16 mi) away.

Twenty-five stations recorded had pga readings exceeding 0.1 g within 60 km (37 mi) of the mainshock's epicenter: all showed at least 0.3 g. The pga at the Superstition Mountain station was the largest and longest ever observed in its 55-year records: 0.9 g and 0.7 g in the horizontal and 0.6 g in the vertical directions. The site also recorded 16 seconds of intense ground motion.

Damage from the M_{w} 6.0 shock in Calipatria, El Centro, Heber, and Westmorland corresponded to VI (Strong) on the Modified Mercalli intensity scale (MMI). The M_{w} 6.5 shock had a maximum MMI of VI–VII (Strong–Very strong) at El Centro and Westmorland. Intensity VI was felt at Brawley, Calexico, Calipatria, Heber, Holtville, Imperial, and Seeley. It was widely felt across southern California. The shaking was also felt more than 300 km (190 mi) away in Las Vegas, Nevada, and Tempe, Arizona, and in Mexico's Tijuana and Ensenada.

== Impact ==
Although both earthquakes were larger than the Whittier Narrows earthquake of October, damage was moderate because they occurred in a sparsely populated area, estimated at US$3 million. At least 94 people were injured: 50 in Mexicali and 44 in Imperial County. In Mexicali, two people died after an oncoming vehicle crashed into them while evacuating a factory while some people had broken bones, sprains, cuts and some heart attacks. Thirty-five buildings were damaged, including three hospitals and the city hall. Some 650 people were evacuated from these buildings. An Immigration and Naturalization Service station between the city and Calexico experienced heavy interior damage. Fires also broke out in other buildings.

The M_{w} 6.0 shock cut power in parts of Niland but the town was undamaged. In a Westmorland grocery store, merchandise fell and a window cracked. Damage to telephone lines temporarily disrupted communication services in the valley. At the San Onofre Nuclear Plant, there was an "unusual event" declaration. A runway at the Naval Air Facility El Centro was closed for inspections, later revealing small cracks.

Collapsed chimneys, severed pipes, shattered windows, and highways were offset in El Centro, Imperial, and Westmorland. Liquefaction damage rendered a bridge across the New River a complete loss. Near Westmorland, operations at the Desert Test Range Control Center ceased because of a damaged water tank and equipment. Several buildings in Calexico's business district sustained damage, and a brick wall toppled onto some cars. The two-story Imperial County services building, a steel frame structure, only received nonstructural damage. County buildings in El Centro were structurally resilient but had material destruction. The Southern California Irrigation District estimated the damage to its facilities at US$600–750 thousand. The foreshock caused minor buckling of the canal's concrete reinforcement, while the mainshock collapsed much of the concrete. Concrete channels and pipe siphons had significant damage, and cracking was extensive along the aqueduct.

== Response ==
The mainshock immediately disrupted power to 65,000 homes and businesses, but it was restored within 20 minutes. Telecommunications, power, and gas services were interrupted throughout Westmorland, El Centro, Calexico and Mexicali. Despite the damage to canal facilities, officials said it did not affect the flow of water. In El Centro, detainees of the Immigration and Naturalization Service were relocated to the courtyard due to damage at the station. Law enforcement officers were on high alert for looters in Calexico. California 86 between Westmorland and El Centro was damaged and closed off. A buckled road near the junction with Interstate 8 also forced California 98 to close. Aircraft from the United States Customs Service and Mexico were flown to inspect the damage.

In Orange County, residents stocked up on their earthquake preparedness kits. One store also saw a rise in sales for bottled water, water purification devices, and propane tanks. In La Habra, four households called for a home inspection. The California Department of Transportation dispatched 150 personnel to inspect freeways in the county for damage. The San Diego Fire-Rescue Department reported small cracks in the walls and ceilings at five stations.

== See also ==
- List of earthquakes in the United States
- List of earthquakes in California
- List of earthquakes in Mexico
