= 1981 Westmorland earthquake =

1981 earthquake in southern California, United States

- Location within California
- UTC time: 1981-04-26 12:09:31
- ISC event: 628772
- USGS-ANSS: ComCat
- Local date: April 26, 1981; 45 years ago
- Local time: 5:09 a.m. PDT
- Magnitude: 5.9 M_{w}^{(ISC)}
- Depth: 10 km (6.2 mi)
- Epicenter: 33.02°N 115.68°W
- Type: Strike-slip
- Areas affected: Imperial Valley; Southern California; United States
- Total damage: US$1–3 million
- Max. intensity: MMI VII (Very strong)

The 1981 Westmorland earthquake occurred at 05:09 Pacific Daylight Time (12:09 UTC) on April 26. The moderate strike-slip shock took place in the Imperial Valley of Southern California, just north of the Mexico–United States border. No injuries or deaths occurred, but damage was estimated at $1–3 million. With a Mercalli intensity of VII (Very strong), this was one of fifteen intensity VII or greater shocks in the Imperial Valley that were observed in the 20th century up until April 1981. The region experiences large stand-alone events and earthquake swarms due to its position in an area of complex conditions where faulting transitions from strike-slip movement to the north and divergence to the south.

== Preface ==
The Imperial Valley of Southern California is very active seismically and has been subject to numerous destructive earthquakes since communities began to form in this desert area in the late 19th and early 20th centuries. Records of events prior to this period do not exist due to a lack of settlers in the area. Fifteen shocks of intensity VII or higher were recorded prior to April 1981 and beginning with the intensity VIII shock of April 18, 1906, which was a triggered event following the 1906 San Francisco earthquake.

== Tectonic setting ==
The Gulf of California Rift Zone underlies the Gulf of California from the mouth of the Colorado River in Baja California and stretching to the southeast. It contains numerous right-lateral transform faults and rift zones that make up the Pacific–North American plate boundary. The southern portion has matured into seafloor spreading, and at the northern end of the province is the Salton Trough, which is considered to be an onshore spreading center. The rift zone is covered by thick layers of sediment from the Colorado River drainage basin.

The region experiences large stand-alone events and earthquake swarms due to its position in an area of complex faulting where it transitions from the strike-slip movement of the San Andreas Fault system to that of the divergent Gulf of California Rift Zone, which is an area of active seafloor spreading.

== Earthquake ==
The Global Centroid Moment Tensor Database shows a NNW strike on a nearly vertical fault, with a rake angle that is within 45 degrees of being pure strike-slip.

=== Intensity ===
Calipatria and Westmorland both experienced intensity VII shaking (Very strong), which was the maximum observed intensity for the event. At these locations, roads and house foundations were cracked, interior and exterior walls experienced partial collapse, chimneys fell, windows were broken, and underground water pipes burst. The shock was felt over an area of 73,500 km^{2}, and the communities of Encino and Cedar Glen in California, and Bouse in Arizona were at the outermost extremity of the felt area in the United States.

== See also ==
- List of earthquakes in California
- List of earthquakes in the United States
