= Westmorland, California =

City in California, United States

City of Westmorland
- City
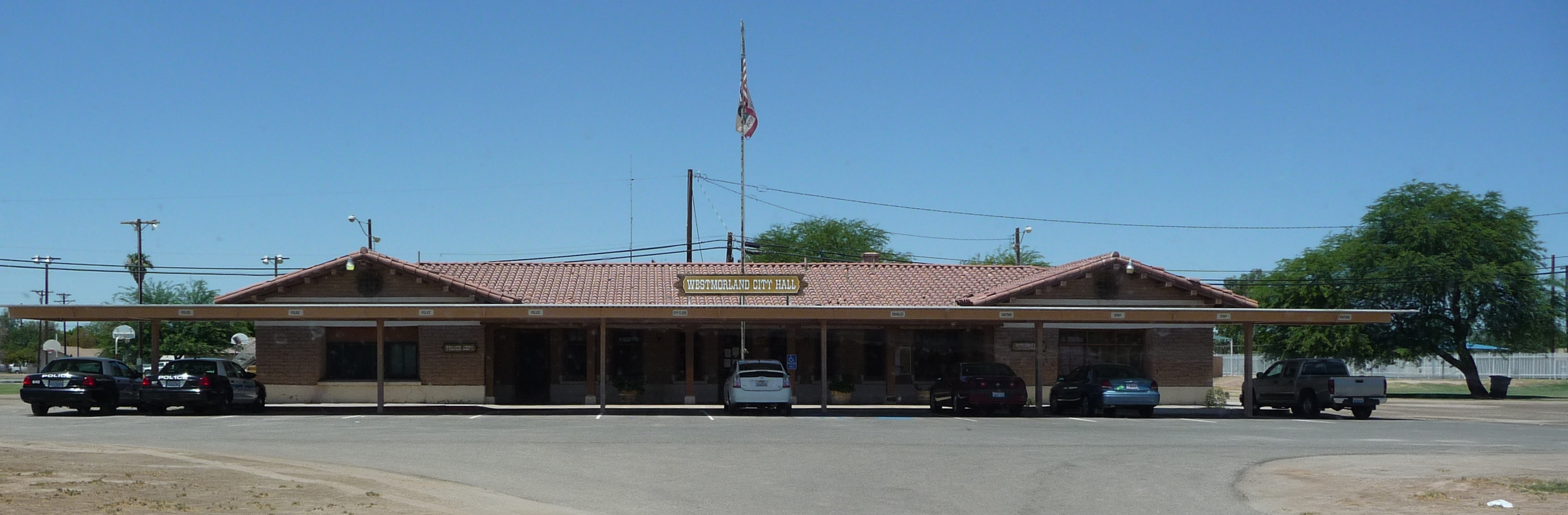
- City Hall of Westmorland

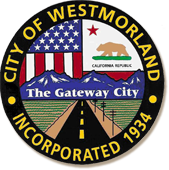
- Seal
- Motto: "Today's Roadrunners Tomorrow's Leaders"
- Interactive map of City of Westmorland
- Location within California Location within the United States
- Coordinates: 33°02′14″N 115°37′17″W
- Country: United States
- State: California
- County: Imperial
- Incorporated: June 30, 1934

Government
  - Mayor: Judith Rivera

Area
  - Total: 0.59 sq mi (1.53 km^{2})
  - Land: 0.59 sq mi (1.53 km^{2})
  - Water: 0 sq mi (0.00 km^{2}) 0%
- Elevation: −164 ft (−50 m)

Population (2020)
  - Total: 2,014
  - Density: 3,819.8/sq mi (1,474.85/km^{2})
- Time zone: UTC-08:00 (PST)
  - Summer (DST): UTC-07:00 (PDT)
- ZIP code: 92281
- Area codes: 442/760
- FIPS code: 06-84606
- GNIS feature IDs: 1652812, 2412239
- Website: www.cityofwestmorland.net

Westmorland (formerly Westmoreland) is a city in Imperial County, California. Westmorland is located 8.5 miles (14 km) southwest of Calipatria. The population was 2,014 at the 2020 census, down from 2,225 at the 2010 census, up from 2,131 in 2000. It is part of the El Centro Metropolitan Area. The mayor of Westmorland is Judith Rivera.

Westmorland is on State Route 86, which was upgraded to a new six-lane highway to reduce its infamous auto accident and fatality risk, while it connects with Brawley, El Centro and Mexicali, Baja California, Mexico.

The post office, originally called Westmoreland, opened in 1909; it closed in 1912 and re-opened in 1919. It was renamed to Westmorland in 1936. Westmorland incorporated in 1934.

From the 1920s through the 1950s Westmorland was the site of illegal gaming establishments and many brothels, but these were later destroyed in an attempt to improve the town's image.

Westmorland has dealt with the image of high poverty rates, and prior to the 1990s North American Free Trade Agreement (NAFTA) economic boom, a nearly dormant farm food shipping industry.

== Geography ==
According to the United States Census Bureau, the city has a total area of 0.6 square miles (1.6 km^{2}), all land.

Westmorland is below sea level and sits behind a number of active faults. Seismic activity has been recorded several times during the 20th century, with tremors occurring in 1907, 1916, 1925, 1940, 1948, 1965, and 1979. The 1987 Superstition Hills event caused serious damage in Westmorland and the Imperial Valley.

== Demographics ==
Historical population
| Census | Pop. | Note | %± |
|---|---|---|---|
| 1940 | 1,010 | | — |
| 1950 | 1,213 | | 20.1% |
| 1960 | 1,404 | | 15.7% |
| 1970 | 1,175 | | −16.3% |
| 1980 | 1,590 | | 35.3% |
| 1990 | 1,380 | | −13.2% |
| 2000 | 2,131 | | 54.4% |
| 2010 | 2,225 | | 4.4% |
| 2020 | 2,014 | | −9.5% |
U.S. Decennial Census

=== 2020 census ===
As of the 2020 census, Westmorland had a population of 2,014, all of whom lived in households. The population density was 3,413.6 inhabitants per square mile (1,318.0/km^{2}). The median age was 32.5 years. The age distribution was 656 people (32.6%) under the age of 18, 165 people (8.2%) aged 18 to 24, 466 people (23.1%) aged 25 to 44, 445 people (22.1%) aged 45 to 64, and 282 people (14.0%) who were 65 years of age or older. For every 100 females there were 92.0 males, and for every 100 females age 18 and over there were 87.1 males age 18 and over.

0.0% of residents lived in urban areas, while 100.0% lived in rural areas.

There were 631 households, out of which 309 (49.0%) had children under the age of 18 living in them. Of all households, 278 (44.1%) were married-couple households, 45 (7.1%) were cohabiting couple households, 210 (33.3%) had a female householder with no spouse or partner present, and 98 (15.5%) had a male householder with no spouse or partner present. About 106 households (16.8%) were made up of individuals, and 51 (8.1%) had someone living alone who was 65 years of age or older. The average household size was 3.19. There were 484 families (76.7% of all households).

There were 655 housing units at an average density of 1,110.2 units per square mile (428.7 units/km^{2}), of which 631 (96.3%) were occupied. Of these, 299 (47.4%) were owner-occupied, and 332 (52.6%) were occupied by renters. The remaining 3.7% were vacant housing units. The homeowner vacancy rate was 0.0% and the rental vacancy rate was 3.2%.

Racial composition as of the 2020 census
| Race | Number | Percent |
|---|---|---|
| White | 640 | 31.8% |
| Black or African American | 23 | 1.1% |
| American Indian and Alaska Native | 30 | 1.5% |
| Asian | 11 | 0.5% |
| Native Hawaiian and Other Pacific Islander | 0 | 0.0% |
| Some other race | 683 | 33.9% |
| Two or more races | 627 | 31.1% |
| Hispanic or Latino (of any race) | 1,786 | 88.7% |

=== Income and poverty ===
In 2023, the US Census Bureau estimated that the median household income was $28,929, and the per capita income was $14,375. About 47.7% of families and 49.3% of the population were below the poverty line.

=== 2010 census ===
At the 2010 census Westmorland had a population of 2,225. The population density was 3,769.7 inhabitants per square mile (1,455.5/km^{2}). The racial makeup of Westmorland was 1,038 (46.7%) White, 21 (0.9%) African American, 38 (1.7%) Native American, 11 (0.5%) Asian, 0 (0.0%) Pacific Islander, 1,042 (46.8%) from other races, and 75 (3.4%) from two or more races. Hispanic or Latino of any race were 1,938 persons (87.1%).

The whole population lived in households, no one lived in non-institutionalized group quarters and no one was institutionalized.

There were 631 households, 336 (53.2%) had children under the age of 18 living in them, 299 (47.4%) were opposite-sex married couples living together, 174 (27.6%) had a female householder with no husband present, 61 (9.7%) had a male householder with no wife present. There were 61 (9.7%) unmarried opposite-sex partnerships, and 4 (0.6%) same-sex married couples or partnerships. 89 households (14.1%) were one person and 42 (6.7%) had someone living alone who was 65 or older. The average household size was 3.53. There were 534 families (84.6% of households); the average family size was 3.82.

The age distribution was 765 people (34.4%) under the age of 18, 234 people (10.5%) aged 18 to 24, 527 people (23.7%) aged 25 to 44, 449 people (20.2%) aged 45 to 64, and 250 people (11.2%) who were 65 or older. The median age was 29.2 years. For every 100 females, there were 87.8 males. For every 100 females age 18 and over, there were 86.9 males.

There were 678 housing units at an average density of 1,148.7 per square mile (443.5/km^{2}), of which 631 were occupied, 299 (47.4%) by the owners and 332 (52.6%) by renters. The homeowner vacancy rate was 1.6%; the rental vacancy rate was 5.9%. 1,066 people (47.9% of the population) lived in owner-occupied housing units and 1,159 people (52.1%) lived in rental housing units.

== Politics ==
In the state legislature, Westmorland is in the 18th senatorial district, represented by Democrat Steve Padilla, and the 36th Assembly district, represented by Republican Jeff Gonzalez.

Federally, Westmorland is in California's 25th congressional district, represented by Democrat Raul Ruiz.

== Schools ==
Westmorland children (grades K-8) are part of the Westmorland Elementary School District, while high-school age students are members of the neighboring Brawley Union High School District.

== Infrastructure ==
=== Public safety ===
Westmorland has one of the smallest police departments in California, with a chief and five full-time officers with only five patrol cars. The Imperial County Fire Department provides fire and paramedic services.

== Utilities ==
The city's public works department operates its own water and wastewater system.

== See also ==
- 1981 Westmorland earthquake
- San Diego–Imperial, California
- El Centro Metropolitan Area
