= 1940 El Centro earthquake =

Earthquake affecting Southern California and Baja California

- UTC time: 1940-05-19 04:36:47
- ISC event: 901341
- USGS-ANSS: ComCat
- Local date: May 18, 1940; 86 years ago
- Local time: 21:35 PST
- Magnitude: 6.9 M_{w}
- Depth: 16 km (9.9 mi)
- Epicenter: 32.733°N 115.5°W
- Type: Strike-slip
- Areas affected: United States, Mexico
- Total damage: $6 million
- Max. intensity: MMI X (Extreme)
- Casualties: 9 dead 20 injured

The 1940 El Centro earthquake (or 1940 Imperial Valley earthquake) occurred at 21:35 Pacific Standard Time on May 18 (05:35 UTC on May 19) in the Imperial Valley in southeastern Southern California near the international border of the United States and Mexico. It had a moment magnitude of 6.9 and a maximum perceived intensity of X (Extreme) on the Mercalli intensity scale. It was the first major earthquake to be recorded by a strong-motion seismograph located next to a fault rupture. The earthquake was characterized as a typical moderate-sized destructive event with a complex energy release signature. It was the strongest recorded earthquake in the Imperial Valley, causing widespread damage to irrigation systems and killing nine people.

== Tectonic setting ==
The Salton Trough is part of the complex plate boundary between the Pacific plate and the North American plate where it undergoes a transition from the continental transform of the San Andreas Fault system to the series of short spreading centers of the East Pacific Rise linked by oceanic transforms in the Gulf of California. The two main right lateral strike-slip fault strands that extend across the southern part of the trough are the Elsinore Fault Zone/Laguna Salada Fault to the western side of the trough and the Imperial Fault to the east. The Imperial Fault is linked to the San Andreas Fault through the Brawley seismic zone, which is a spreading center beneath the southern end of the Salton Sea.

With the San Jacinto Fault Zone to the west, the Elsinore fault to the south-southwest, and the Imperial fault centered directly under the Imperial Valley, the area frequently encounters seismic activity, including moderate and damaging earthquakes. Other events in 1852, 1892, 1915, 1942, 1979, and 1987 have impacted the region in varying degrees.

== Earthquake ==
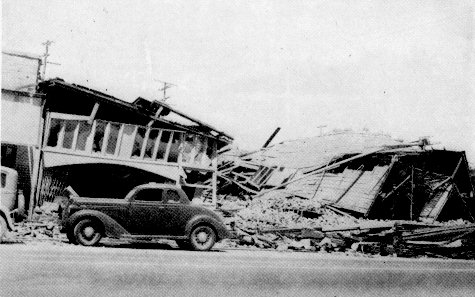
Collapsed buildings in Imperial, California, in which four people died

The earthquake was the result of a rupture along the Imperial Fault, with its epicenter 5 miles (8.0 km) north of Calexico, California. A strong secondary earthquake with a magnitude of 5.5 followed a little more than an hour after the mainshock and was centered near Brawley.

In an interview with the Los Angeles Times shortly after the earthquake, Dr. Beno Gutenberg, a geophysicist and professor at the Caltech Seismological Laboratory in Pasadena, prematurely reported that the source of the earthquake was the San Jacinto Fault and compared the earthquake to the 1933 Long Beach earthquake saying "The energy of the Imperial Vally shock was less, and it should have done less damage, than the one of 1933, even had it occurred in an area of greater population." The Imperial Fault had not been previously differentiated from the other faults in the area by geologists until after the earthquake occurred.

=== Damage ===
The event caused significant damage in the towns of Brawley, Imperial, El Centro, Calexico and Mexicali and was responsible for nine fatalities. Imperial appeared to receive the most damage and was described as "razed" with at least 80 percent of its buildings damaged and at least two people killed. It was felt as far afield as Los Angeles and Tucson, Arizona.

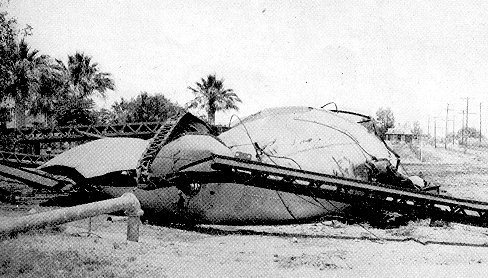
Imperial's 100,000 gallon water tank that collapsed in the earthquake

The earthquake also caused substantial damage to irrigation systems over a very wide area of the valley, with the canals of the Imperial Irrigation District being breached in multiple locations. With ninety percent of the damage done to the canals south of the international border, water rationing became necessary in Brawley and Imperial during the days following the earthquake spanning the restoration period. The canals brought water from the Mexican side of the border to the United States and supplied 3000 miles of irrigation waterways and ditches in the Imperial Valley. The primary trunkline was the Alamo Canal and it sustained nine breaks, each several hundred feet in length, along a twenty-mile stretch between Sharp's heading and Cudahy check.

In Mexico, a 427 m (1,401 ft) long wooden flume was completely destroyed south of Mexicali where the Solfatara canal crossed the New River, and water storage tanks were destroyed at Imperial and Holtville. The railroad system also suffered damage, with bent rails and damage to several bridges. The heaviest damage in Mexicali, the capital of the State of Baja California, was a fire which destroyed a hotel there. The fire was blamed on a short circuit.

=== Strong motion ===
A strong-motion seismograph at El Centro recorded the earthquake and provided the first example of such a recording made very close to a fault rupture in a major earthquake. This gave a detailed record of the different types of shaking associated with the earthquake. It is often used in design of earthquake-proof structures today, particularly for the time history analysis method.

The recording showed that the earthquake consisted of several sub-events, with a total of 13 being recorded in just over five minutes. A 1970 report on the earthquake in the Bulletin of the Seismological Society of America defined an event as "any occurrence of energy release which generates seismic phases that can be resolved and identified" then stated that the size of those discrete events were abnormally strong for regular aftershocks. The majority of the energy released during the earthquake occurred in the first fifteen seconds, although significant energy was released as late as the last of those events, near the 5:20 mark on the seismograph record.

=== Surface rupture ===
A surface rupture was formed during the earthquake of 40–60 km (25–37 mi), with a maximum recorded displacement of 4.5 m (15 ft) close to the border. The sense of movement along the rupture was almost pure strike-slip, with no vertical displacement seen. During the 1979 Imperial Valley earthquake the same section of the fault ruptured on the US side of the border, but this time there was no sign of rupture on the Mexican side. The displacement pattern of the two earthquakes was very similar on the US side, suggesting that the Imperial Fault slips in discrete patches. Two of these patches are thought to have ruptured in 1940 but only the northern one in 1979.

== Aftermath ==
Soon after the earthquake, reconstruction efforts were concentrated on repairing the Alamo and Solfatara irrigation canals to save the cantaloupe crop, and the water supply was restored in less than four days.

== See also ==
- 1892 Laguna Salada earthquake
- List of earthquakes in 1940
- List of earthquakes in California
- List of earthquakes in Mexico
- List of earthquakes in the United States
