= Wagner Basin =

Wagner Basin is a submarine depression in the far northern part of the Gulf of California. The basin is currently tectonically active. It is the northernmost underwater depression associated with the East Pacific Rise and is located near the southern end of the Cerro Prieto fault. The depression is a result of subsidence caused by the extensional forces imparted by a spreading center. The Wagner Basin is bounded on its eastern side by the Wagner Fault, a primarily normal (vertical motion) fault which dips approximately 60 degrees to the northwest. The western side of the basin is bounded by another normal fault, the Consag Fault which dips in a direction opposite the Wagner Fault. The seabed between these faults is sinking. The basin is linked to the dextral (right lateral-moving) Cerro Prieto Fault at its north end.

== See also ==
- Gulf of California Rift Zone
