= Cerro Prieto =

Volcano in Baja California, Mexico

Coordinates: 32.418°N 115.308°W

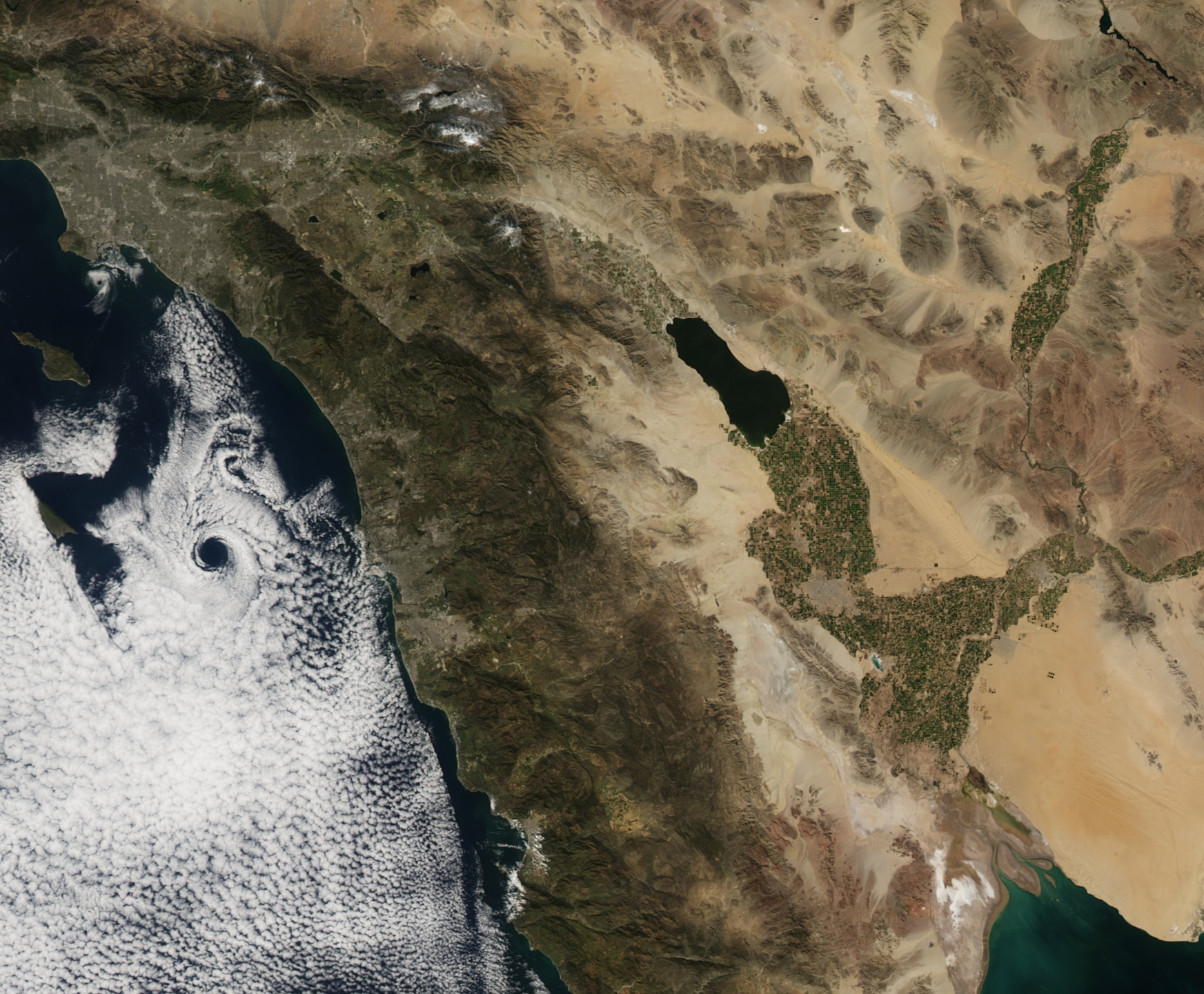
Cerro Prieto area. The red lines are simplified faults. Right-lateral direction of motion of the transform fault is shown (pink arrows). The red rhombs are pull-apart basins; the northern one is the site of the Niland geothermal field, the southern the Cerro Prieto geothermal field.

Cerro Prieto (Cocopah: Wee Ñaay, lit. 'Dark Hill') is a volcano located approximately 29 km (18 mi) SSE of Mexicali in the Mexican state of Baja California. The volcano lies astride a spreading center associated with the East Pacific Rise. This spreading center is also responsible for a large geothermal field, which has been harnessed to generate electric power by the Cerro Prieto Geothermal Power Station.

The Cerro Prieto spreading center intersects the southern end of the Imperial Fault and the northern end of the Cerro Prieto Fault. Both of these are transform faults in the northern leg of the East Pacific Rise system that runs the length of the Gulf of California and is steadily rifting the Baja California peninsula away from the mainland of Mexico.
