= Imperial Fault Zone =

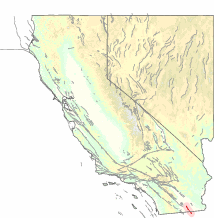
United States Geological Survey map with the Imperial Fault Zone outlined in red

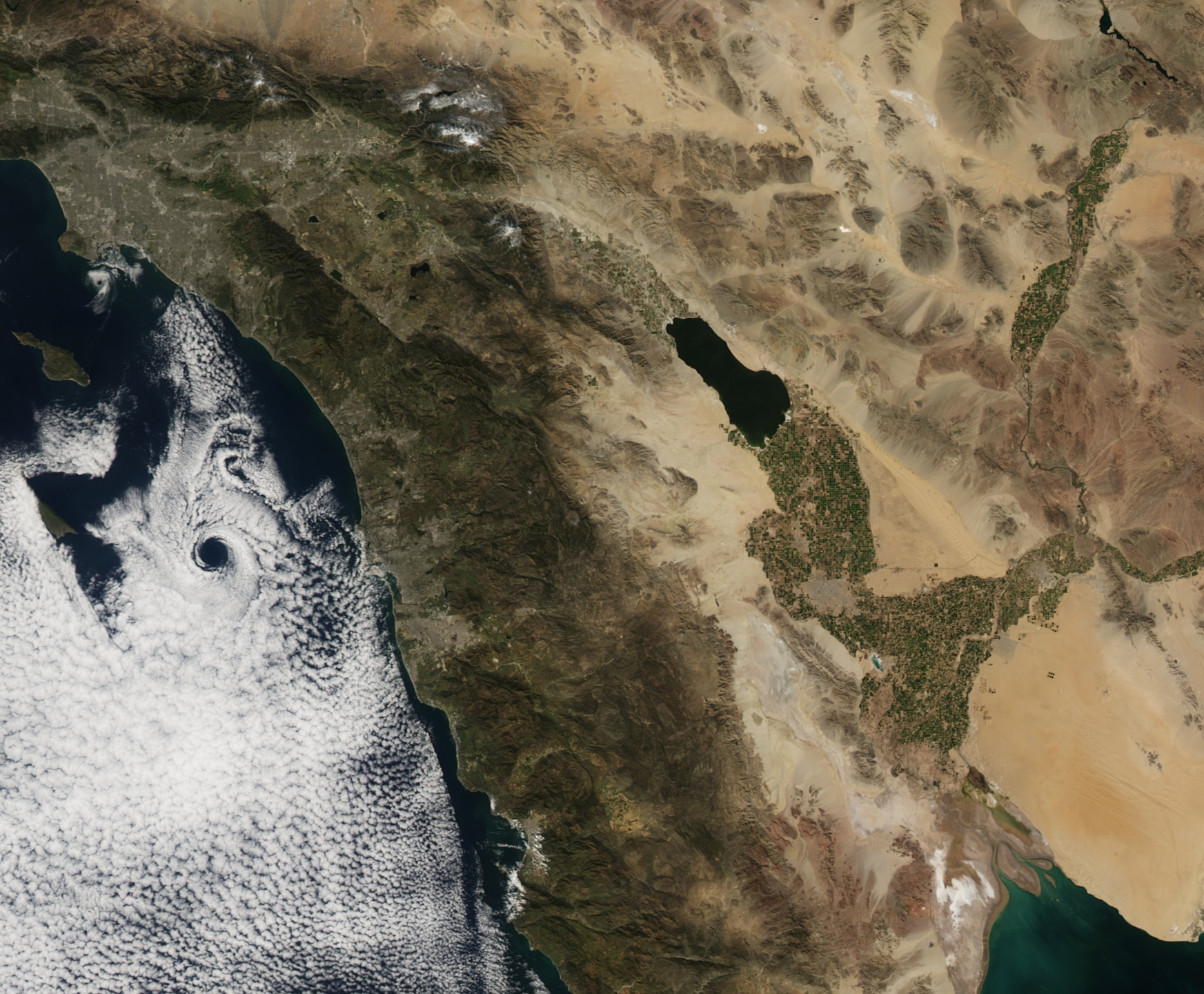
Imperial fault and surrounding area. The red lines are simplified faults. Right-lateral direction of motion of the transform fault is shown (pink arrows). The red rhombs are pull-apart basins; the northern one is the site of the Niland geothermal field, the southern the Cerro Prieto geothermal field. The Imperial Fault lies in-between.

The Imperial Fault Zone is a system of geological faults located in Imperial County in the Southern California region, and adjacent Baja California state in Mexico. It cuts across the border between the United States and Mexico.

== Geology ==
The Imperial Fault Zone is a right lateral-moving strike-slip fault, representing the northernmost transform fault associated with the East Pacific Rise. It is connected to the San Andreas Fault by the Brawley Seismic Zone. It terminates on its southern end at the Cerro Prieto spreading center.

The Imperial Fault Zone is thought to accommodate slip from both the San Andreas and the San Jacinto fault zones. However, studies covering the last few hundred years show that the slip rate is insufficient to account for the total slip from the San Andreas system. The surface trace is well-located based on mapped surface offsets from historic events.

== Earthquake history ==
The Imperial Fault Zone has a history of earthquakes of moderate magnitude, including several doublet earthquakes.

- 1915 Imperial Valley earthquakes: Two magnitude 6.25 shocks occurred ~1 hour apart. Six people died and several were injured in the second quake at Mexicali, located just inside the Mexican border. Unstable banks of the New and Alamo Rivers caved in many places.
- 1940 El Centro earthquake
- 1979 Imperial Valley earthquake
- 2010 Baja California earthquake

== See also ==
- Cerro Prieto Fault
- Gulf of California Rift Zone
- Salton Trough
