= Cerro Prieto Fault =

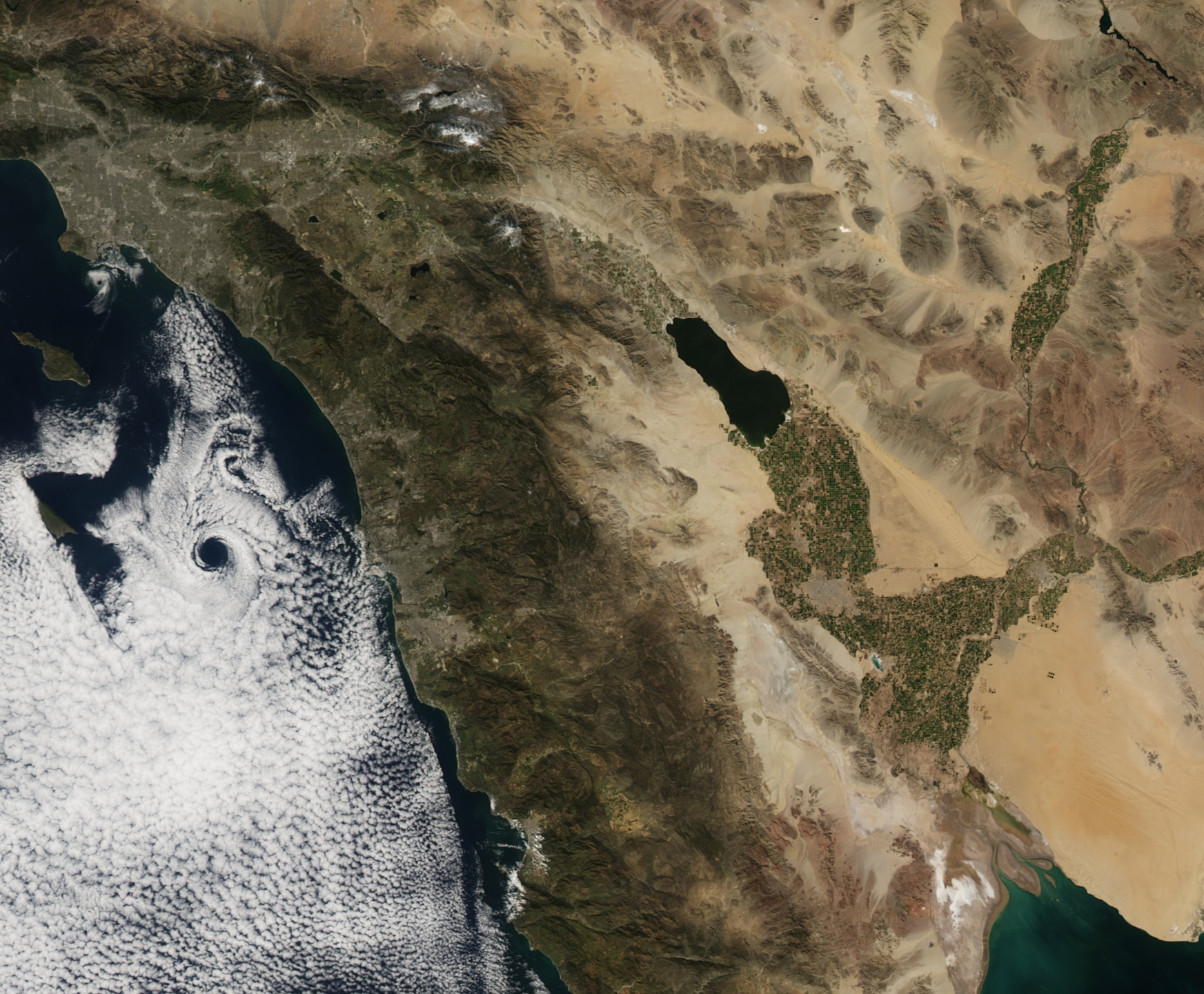
Cierro Prieto fault and area to the north. The red lines are simplified faults. Right-lateral direction of motion of the transform fault is shown (pink arrows). The red rhombs are pull-apart basins; the northern one is the site of the Niland geothermal field, the southern the Cerro Prieto geothermal field.

The Cerro Prieto Fault is a transform fault located in far northern Baja California. It runs between the Cerro Prieto spreading center located southwest of Mexicali, and the Wagner Basin, another spreading center which lies under the Gulf of California. These spreading centers are part of the East Pacific Rise, the northern leg of which has formed the Gulf of California by steadily rifting the Baja California peninsula away from the mainland of Mexico.

Seismic studies indicate a linear trend of hypocenters to the northwest of Cerro Prieto which is interpreted as a continuation of the Cerro Prieto Fault some 45 km to the northwest across the international border about 7 km into southern California.
