= Salton Trough =

Tectonic pull-apart basin in the United States and Mexico

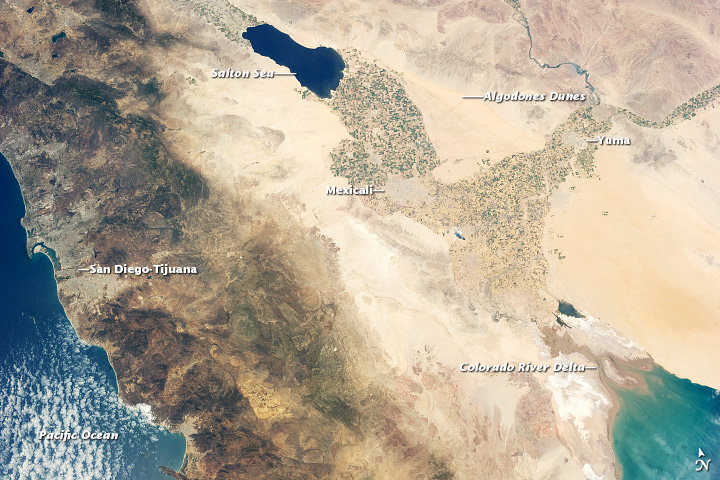
The Salton Trough region from orbit.

The Salton Trough is an active tectonic pull-apart basin, or graben. It lies within the Imperial, Riverside, and San Diego counties of southeastern California and extends south of the Mexico–United States border into the state of Baja California. It contains the Coachella Valley, the Salton Sea, and the Imperial Valley.

== Description ==
The Salton Trough is classified as a distinct section of the Basin and Range Province within the Intermontane Plateaus division. The northwestern end of the trough starts at the San Gorgonio Pass in Riverside County and extends 115 miles (185 km) southeast to the Gulf of California. Major geographical features located in the trough include the Coachella Valley, the Salton Sea, and the Imperial Valley, in the United States, and the western side of the Mexicali Valley and the Colorado River Delta in Mexico.

At 236 ft (72 m) below sea level, the Salton Sink is the topographic low area within the Salton Trough and is the second-lowest point, after Death Valley, on the North American continent. At 210 ft (64 m) below sea level, the Salton Sea, which fills the lowest part of the Salton Sink, is the lowest permanent lake in North America.

The Salton Trough is commonly subject to migrating earthquake swarms. The Salton Buttes, located within the Salton Sea, are rhyolite lava domes within the basin which were active 10,300 (± 1000) years BP. The Niland Geyser is one of dozens of mudpots and mud volcanoes in the Salton Trough but is the only one in the world known to have moved significantly, affecting the Union Pacific Railroad, California State Route 111, and other infrastructure since 2018.

== Geology ==
The Salton Trough is a result of crustal stretching and sinking caused by the combined actions of the San Andreas Fault and the East Pacific Rise, particularly the Gulf of California Rift Zone (GCRZ), the northernmost portion of the East Pacific Rise. The GCRZ and the San Andreas Fault both terminate near the south end of the Salton Sea, in an area called the Brawley Seismic Zone. The Brawley Seismic Zone is an active spreading center that connects the San Andreas Fault system with the Imperial Fault Zone to the south.

The Salton Trough is also referred to as a sedimentary basin because the basin has filled with sedimentary deposits as quickly as the basin has been sinking. In some areas, the sediment is more than 20,000 ft (6,100 m) deep. Sources of the sediment are the mountainous areas that surround the trough, and the Colorado River, which in the past fed Lake Cahuilla, a large inland freshwater lake that disappeared after the Colorado River changed course to the Gulf of California.
