= Pull-apart basin =

Type of basin in geology

In geology, a basin is a region where subsidence generates accommodation space for the deposition of sediments. A pull-apart basin is a structural basin where two overlapping (en echelon) strike-slip faults or a fault bend create an area of crustal extension undergoing tension, which causes the basin to sink down. Frequently, the basins are rhombic or sigmoidal in shape. Dimensionally, basins are limited to the distance between the faults and the length of overlap.

== Mechanics and fault configuration ==
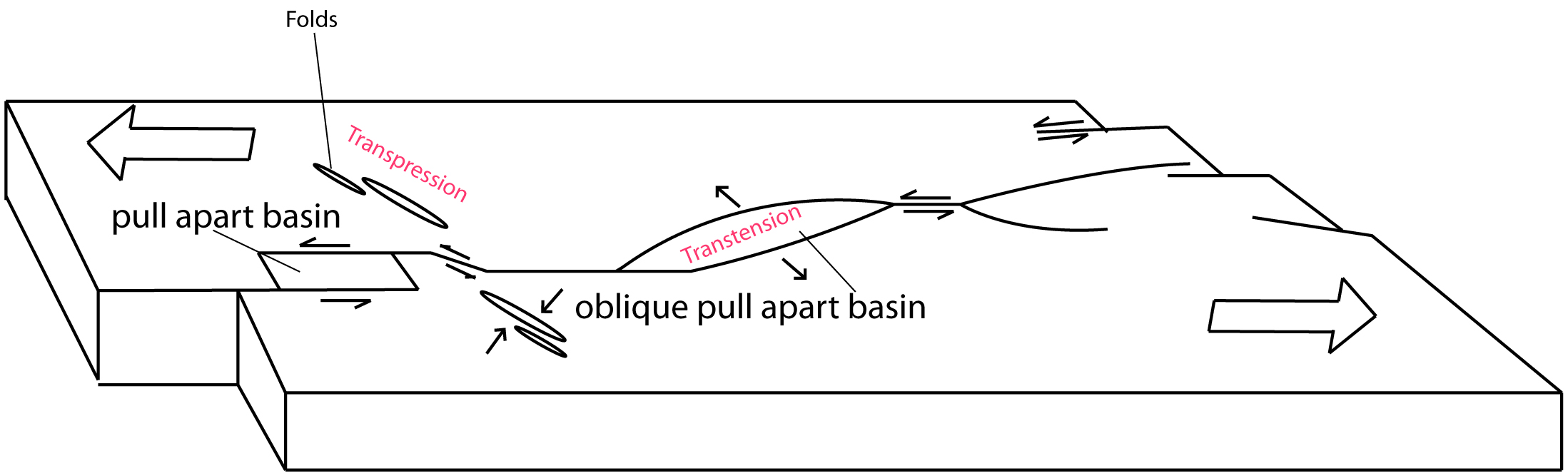
Diagram of a pull-apart basin redrawn from Frisch et al. 2010

The inhomogeneity and structural complexity of continental crust causes faults to deviate from a straight course and frequently causes bends or step-overs in fault paths. Bends and step-overs of adjacent faults become favorable locations for extensional and compressional stress or transtension and transpression stress, if the shear motion is oblique. Pull-apart basins form in extensional to transtensional environments along fault bends or between two adjacent left-lateral faults or two right-lateral faults. The step-over or bend in the fault must be the same direction as sense of motion on the fault otherwise the area will be subject to transpression.

For example, two overlapping left lateral fault must have a left-step-over to create a pull-apart basin. This is illustrated in the accompanying figures.

A regional strike slip fault is referred to as a principle displacement zone (PDZ). Connecting the tips of step over faults to the opposite fault are bounding basin sidewall faults. The tectonic subsidence of strike-slip basins is mainly episodic, short lived (typically less than 10 Ma), and end abruptly with commonly very high tectonic subsidence rates (greater than 0.5 km/Ma) compared to all other basin types. Recent sandbox models have shown that the geometry and evolution of pull-apart basins varies greatly in pure-strike slip situations versus transtensional settings. Transtensional settings are believed to generate greater surface subsidence than pure-strike slip alone.

== Examples ==
Famous localities for continental pull-apart basins are the Dead Sea, the Salton Sea, and the Sea of Marmara. Pull-apart basins are amenable to research because sediments deposited in the basin provide a timeline of activity along the fault. The Salton Trough is an active pull-apart located in a step-over between the dextral San Andreas Fault and the Imperial Fault. Displacement on the fault is approximately 6 cm/yr. The current transtensional state generates normal growth faults and some strike slip motion. The growth faults in the region strike N15E, have steep dips (~70 deg), and vertical displacements of 1–4 mm/yr. Eight large slip events have occurred on these faults with throw ranging from 0.2 to 1.0 meters. These produce earthquakes greater than magnitude six and are responsible for the majority of extension in the basin and consequently thermal anomalies, subsidence, and localization of rhyolite buttes such as the Salton Buttes.

== Economic significance ==
Pull-apart basins represent an important exploration target for oil and gas, porphyry copper mineralisation, and geothermal fields. The Matzen fault system in the Matzen oil field has been recast as extensional grabens produced by pull-apart basins of the Vienna Basin. The Dead Sea has been studied extensively and thinning of the crust in pull-aparts may generate differential loading and instigate salt diapirs to rise, a frequent trap for hydrocarbons. Likewise intense deformation and rapid subsidence and deposition in pull-aparts creates numerous structural and stratigraphic traps, enhancing their viability as hydrocarbon reservoirs.

The shallow extensional regime of pull-apart basins also facilitates the emplacement of felsic intrusive rocks with high copper mineralisation. It is believed to be the main structural control on the giant Escondida deposit in Chile. Geothermal fields are located in pull-aparts for the same reason due to the high heat flow associated with rising magmas.
