= UCERF2 =

California Earthquake Rupture Forecast

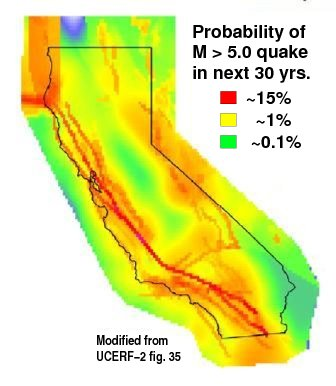
UCERF participation probability map. Mean probability that a given location will be involved in an M ≥ 5 rupture of any source during the next 30 years. The most prominent red line is the San Andreas fault (overall probability of rupture ~70%). The red zone at the northwest corner is the southern end of the Cascadia subduction zone, that on the California-Nevada state line is Walker Lane. Modified from UCERF-2 figure 35.

The 2008 Uniform California Earthquake Rupture Forecast, Version 2, or UCERF2, is one of a series of earthquake forecasts prepared for the state California by the Working Group on California Earthquake Probabilities (WGCEP), collaboration of the United States Geological Survey, the California Geological Survey, and the Southern California Earthquake Center, with funding from the California Earthquake Authority. UCERF2 was superseded by UCERF3 in 2015.

Of the hundreds of seismogenic (earthquake causing) geologic faults in California, UCERF classifies only six faults as Type A sources, meaning there is sufficient information to both estimate and model the probability of a Magnitude (M) 6.7 or greater earthquake within 30 years. These six faults (summarized in Table A, below) are the: (1) San Andreas (split into northern and southern sections, (2) San Jacinto, (3) Elsinore, (4) Garlock, (5) Calaveras, and (6) Hayward-Rodgers Creek. Faults which are known to be slipping (and therefore seismogenic) but lack sufficient information to fully model how close they might be to rupture are classified as Type B. About twenty of these faults (see Table B) are estimated to have a 5% or greater chance of an M ≥ 6.7 earthquake within 30 years. An additional six areas where strain is accumulating but where knowledge is insufficient to apportion slip onto specific faults are classified as Type C sources.

There is additional chance of earthquakes on faults that were not modeled, and of lesser earthquakes. Northern California has an estimated 12% chance over the same 30 years of an M ≥ 8 megathrust earthquake on the Cascadia subduction zone. UCERF has also prepared "participation probability maps" of the chance that any area will experience an earthquake above a certain magnitude from any source in the next 30 years (see figure).

== Methodology ==
UCERF probabilities of an earthquake on a given fault are based on four layers of modeling:

1. A fault model of the fault's physical geometry.
2. A deformation model of slip rates and related factors for each fault section.
3. An earthquake rate model of the region.
4. A probability model for estimating probability of an earthquake during a specified interval.

These are used to produce both time-independent and time-dependent forecasts of earthquake probabilities. The former are based on "stress-renewal" models of seismic stress being released by an earthquake, then renewing (or rebounding; see Elastic-rebound theory) until it triggers another earthquake. In time-dependent models the probability of a fault rupturing thus depends on how long stress has been accumulating since the last rupture. However, the details of how this happens are not adequately known, so time-dependent methods estimate the periodicity and currently accumulated strain based on observed seismicity. Out of this a time-independent earthquake rate model (ERM) is produced, from which the time-dependent probability model (UCERF) is derived. (For more information see "Can earthquakes be predicted?" in the External links.)

The concept of stress-renewal has been criticized, and may even be invalid,

== Table A ==
These are the six geologic faults in California with sufficient data to use a stress-renewal model for estimating the probability of an M ≥ 6.7 earthquake within the next 30 years. The Hayward fault zone and Rodgers Creek fault are treated as a single fault; the San Andreas fault is treated as two sections. A complete listing of known Quaternary faults can be found at the U.S. Geological Survey's Quaternary Fault and Fold Database (QFFDB). Earthquake probabilities and other details from The Uniform California Earthquake Rupture Forecast, Version 2 (UCERF 2).

Name	QFFDB fault#^{1}	Maps^{1}	Length^{2}	Strike^{3}	Type	Slip rate (mm/yr)^{4}	Notable Earthquakes	30 yr. prob.^{5}
Hayward/ Rodgers Creek Fault Zone	55a 55b 55c 32	S. Fran. S. Jose; S. Rosa	150 km 93 miles	N39°W		9.0	1868 Hayward earthquake	31%
San Andreas Fault north	1a 1b 1c 1d 1e	Ukiah; S. Rosa; S. Fran. Monterey	472 km 293 miles	N12-36°W	Dextral strike-slip	17.0–24.0	1906 San Francisco earthquake	21%
San Andreas Fault south	1f 1g 1h 1i 1j	SLO; LA; S. Bern. S. Ana	546 km 339 miles	N67°W	Dextral strike-slip	10.0–34.0	1857 Fort Tejon earthquake	59%
San Jacinto Fault Zone	125a 125b 125c 125d 125e 125f 125g	S. Ana; El Centro	309 km 192 miles	N58°W		4.0–14.8	1918 San Jacinto earthquake	31%
Elsinore Fault Zone	126a 126b 126c 126d 126e 126f 126g	S. Ana; S. Diego; El Centro	249 km 217 miles	N51°W		2.5–5.0	1910 Elsinore earthquake	11%
Calaveras Fault	54a 54b 54c 54d	S. Fran. S. Jose. Monterey	123 km 76 miles	N31°W	Dextral strike-slip	6.0–15.0	1911 Calaveras earthquake 1979 Coyote Lake earthquake 1984 Morgan Hill earthquake 2007 Alum Rock earthquake	7%
Garlock Fault	69a 69b 69c	LA; Bakersfd; Trona	254 km 158 miles	N68°E		3.0–7.0		5%

Notes for Table A.
1. Fault numbers and maps from USGS Quaternary Fault and Fold Database.
2. Lengths from UCERF-2, Table 4; may vary from QFFDB values.
3. Strikes (orientation) from QDFFB.
4. Slip rates from UCERF-2 Table 4; range reflects different sections.
5. Estimated probability of a M≥6.7 event in 30 years. From UCERF-2 Table 12.

== Table B ==
Approximately twenty geologic faults in California are of "Type B" status, where the probability of an earthquake of M ≥ 6.7 in the next 30 years is estimated to be greater than 5%, but the data is insufficient for stress-renewal modeling. (Not to be confused with the USGS QFFDB class B category of faults of unknown or minor seismicity.)

Name	QFFDB fault#^{2}	Maps^{2}	Length	Strike	Type	Slip rate (mm/yr)^{4}	Notable Earthquakes	30 yr. prob.^{5}
Imperial	132	El Centro					1940 El Centro earthquake, 1979 Imperial Valley earthquake	27%
Maacama- Garberville	30a 30b	Ukiah S. Rosa						13%
Bartlett Springs	29a 29b 29c	Ukiah						9%
Hunting Creek- Berryessa	35a 35b 35c	S. Rosa						9%
Little Salmon (Onshore)	15	Eureka						8%
San Cayetano	95	Los Ang.						8%
Death Valley (N)	49d 141a 141b 141c	Goldfield Death V.						7%
Death Valley (N. of Cucamongo)	49a 49b 49c 49d	Mariposa Goldfield						7%
San Gregorio Connected	60a 60b	S. Fran. Monterey						7%
Black Mtns Frontal (Death Valley)	142a 142b 142c 142d	Death V. Trona						6%
Laguna Salada	126g	El Centro					1892 Laguna Salada earthquake	6%
Oak Ridge (Onshore)	94	Los Ang.						5%
Santa Susana (Sierra Madre)	105a	Los Ang.						5%
Anacapa-Dume	100	Long Beach						5%
Death Valley (S)	143a 143b	Trona						5%
Oak Ridge Connected	94	Los Ang.						5%
Palos Verdes	128a 128b 128c	Long Beach						5%
Coronado Bank	131a 131b	S. Ana S. Diego						5%

Notes for Table B.
1. List of faults from UCERF-2, Table 13. Unless otherwise noted other details are from Appendix A, Table 1.
2. Fault numbers and maps from USGS Quaternary Fault and Fold Database. Some faults lack a QFFDB entry.
5. Estimated probability of a M≥6.7 event in 30 years. From UCERF-2 Table 13.

== See also ==
- California Earthquake Prediction Evaluation Council
- Cascadia subduction zone
- Earthquake prediction
- Elastic-rebound theory
- San Andreas Fault
- Southern California faults
- Walker Lane
