= Doublet earthquake =

Earthquakes with similar waveforms from the same location

In seismology, doublet earthquakes—and more generally, multiple earthquakes or twin earthquakes—were originally identified as multiple earthquakes with nearly identical waveforms originating from the same location. They are now characterized as distinct earthquake sequences having two (or more) main shocks with similar/slightly different magnitudes that occurred twice (or more) in a single moment, sometimes occurring within tens of seconds, but sometimes separated by years. The similarity of magnitude—often within 0.4 magnitude—distinguishes multiplet events from aftershocks, which start at about 1.2 magnitude less than the parent shock (Båth's law) and decrease in magnitude and frequency according to known laws.

Doublet/multiplet events also have nearly identical seismic waveforms, as they come from the same rupture zone and stress field, whereas aftershocks, being peripheral to the main rupture, typically reflect more diverse circumstances of origin. Multiplet events overlap in their focal fields (rupture zones), which can be up to 100 kilometers across for magnitude 7.5 earthquakes. Doublets have been distinguished from triggered earthquakes, where the energy of the seismic waves triggers a distant earthquake with a different rupture zone, although it has been suggested such a distinction reflects "imprecise taxonomy" more than any physical reality.

Multiplet earthquakes are believed to result when asperities, such as large chunks of crust stuck in the rupturing fault, or irregularities or bends in the fault, temporarily impede the main rupture. Unlike a normal earthquake, where it is believed the earthquake releases enough of the tectonic stress driving it that it will take decades to centuries to accumulate enough stress to drive the next earthquake (per the elastic rebound theory), the initial multiplet quake only releases part of the pent-up stress when the rupture hits the asperity. This increases the stress across the asperity, which may fail within seconds, minutes, months, or even years. In the 1997 Harnai earthquake, the initial M_{w} 7.0 shock was followed by an M_{w} 6.8 shock just 19 seconds later. The effect of such powerful shocks so close in time was to double the duration of ground shaking (bringing more structures to the point of collapse), and to double the area affected by the strongest shaking. When a subsequent, and possibly stronger, shock comes hours or days later it may suffice to collapse structures weakened by the previous shock, with serious consequences to rescue and recovery efforts.

Although there have been numerous earthquakes with two or even three primary shocks of such similar magnitude that picking one as the main shock can be somewhat arbitrary, it was not until the 1970s and 1980s that studies of seismograms showed that some of these were not simply unusually large foreshocks and aftershocks. Other studies have shown that about 20% of very large earthquakes (magnitude above 7.5) are doublets, and that, in some cases, 37 to 75 percent of earthquakes are multiplets. A theoretical study found about one earthquake in 15 (~7%) to be a doublet (using a narrow criterion of "doublet"), but also found that in the Solomon Islands six of 57 M ≥ 6.0 earthquakes were doublets, and 4 of 15 M ≥ 7.0 earthquakes, showing that approximately 10% and 25% of those quakes were doublets.

Doublet earthquakes pose a challenge to the characteristic earthquake model used for estimating seismic hazard. This model assumes that faults are segmented, limiting the extent of rupturing, and therefore the maximum size of an earthquake, to the length of the segment. Newer forecasts of seismic hazard, such as UCERF3, factor in a greater likelihood of multisegment ruptures, which changes the relative frequency of different sizes of earthquakes.

== See also ==
- Category:Doublet earthquakes. Only a partial listing.

== Sources ==
- Beroza, Gregory C.; Cole, Alex T.; Ellsworth, William L. (10 March 1995), "Stability of coda wave attenuation during the Loma Prieta, California, earthquake sequence" (PDF), Journal of Geophysical Research: Solid Earth, 100 (B3): 3977–3987, Bibcode:1995JGR...100.3977B, doi:10.1029/94jb02574.
- Donner, Stefanie; Ghods, Abdolreza; Krüger, Frank; Rößler, Dirk; Landgra, Angela; Ballato, Paolo (April 2015), "The Ahar-Varzeghan Earthquake Doublet (M_{w} 6.4 and 6.2) of 11 August 2012: Regional Seismic Moment Tensors and a Seismotectonic Interpretation", Bulletin of the Seismological Society of America, 105 (2a): 791–807, Bibcode:2015BuSSA.105..791D, doi:10.1785/0120140042.
- Felzer, Karen R.; Abercrombie, Rachel E.; Ekström, Göran (February 2004), "A Common Origin for Aftershocks, Foreshocks, and Multiplets", Bulletin of the Seismological Society of America, 94 (1): 88–98, Bibcode:2004BuSSA..94...88F, doi:10.1785/0120030069.
- Hough, Susan E.; Jones, Lucille M. (11 November 1997), "Aftershocks: Are They Earthquakes or Afterthoughts?", Eos, Transactions American Geophysical Union, 78 (45): 505–520, Bibcode:1997EOSTr..78..505H, doi:10.1029/97eo00306.
- Kagan, Yan Y.; Jackson, David D. (October 1999), "Worldwide Doublets of Large Shallow Earthquake" (PDF), Bulletin of the Seismological Society of America, 89 (5): 1147–1155, Bibcode:1999BuSSA..89.1147K, doi:10.1785/BSSA0890051147.
- Lin, Cheng-Horng; Yeh, Yih-Hsiung; Ando, Masataka; Chen, Kuang-Jung; Chang, Tao-Ming; Pu, Hsin-Chieh (December 2008), "Earthquake Doublet Sequences: Evidence of Static Triggering in the Strong Convergent Zones of Taiwan" (PDF), Terrestrial, Atmospheric and Oceanic Sciences, 19 (6): 589–594, Bibcode:2008TAOS...19..589L, doi:10.3319/TAO.2008.19.6.589(PT), ISSN 2311-7680.
- Massin, Frederick; Farrell, Jaime; Smith, Robert B (1 May 2013), "Repeating earthquakes in the Yellowstone volcanic field: Implications for rupture dynamics, ground deformation, and migration in earthquake swarms" (PDF), Journal of Volcanology and Geothermal Research, 257: 159–173, Bibcode:2013JVGR..257..159M, doi:10.1016/j.jvolgeores.2013.03.022, ISSN 0377-0273.
- Nissen, E.; Elliott, J. R.; Sloan, R. A.; Craig, T. J.; Funning, G. J.; Hutko, A.; Parsons, B. E.; Wright, T. J. (April 2016), "Limitations of rupture forecasting exposed by instantaneously triggered earthquake doublet" (PDF), Nature Geoscience, 9 (4): 330–336, Bibcode:2016NatGe...9..330N, doi:10.1038/ngeo2653, S2CID 28839081.
- Oike, Kazuo (November 1971), "On the Nature of the Occurrence of Intermediate and Deep Earthquakes: 3. Focal Mechanisms of Multiplets" (PDF), Journal of the Disaster Prevention Research Institute, 21 (Part 2, no. 189): 153–178.
- Poupinet, G.; Ellsworth, W. L.; Frechet, J. (10 July 1984), "Monitoring Velocity Variations in the Crust Using Earthquake Doublets: An Application to the Calaveras Fault, California", Journal of Geophysical Research: Solid Earth, 89 (B7): 5719–5731, Bibcode:1984JGR....89.5719P, doi:10.1029/jb089ib07p05719, S2CID 129669235.
- Field, Edward H.; et al. (WGCEP) (March 2015), "UCERF3: A New Earthquake Forecast for California's Complex Fault System" (PDF), U.S. Geological Survey 2015–3009, Fact Sheet, doi:10.3133/fs20153009, ISSN 2327-6932.
