= Transverse Ranges =

Group of mountain ranges of southern California

- The ellipse outlines the region of the California Transverse Ranges

Highest point
- Peak: San Gorgonio Mountain
- Elevation: 11,503 ft (3,506 m)
- Coordinates: 34°05′57″N 116°49′29″W

Dimensions
- Length: 300 mi (480 km)

Geography
- Country: United States
- Parent range: Pacific Coast Ranges

The Transverse Ranges are a group of mountain ranges of Southern California, in the Pacific Coast Ranges physiographic region in North America. The Transverse Ranges begin at the southern end of the California Coast Ranges and lie within Santa Barbara, Ventura, Los Angeles, San Bernardino, Riverside and Kern counties. The Peninsular Ranges lie to the south. The name is due to the east–west orientation of the ranges, making them transverse to the general northwest–southeast orientation of most of California's coastal mountains.

The ranges extend from west of Point Conception eastward approximately 500 kilometers into the Mojave and Colorado Desert. The geology and topography of the ranges express three distinct segments that have contrasting elevations, rock types, and vegetation. The western segment extends to the San Gabriel Mountains and San Gabriel fault. The central segment includes mountains that range eastward to the San Andreas fault. The eastern segment extends from the Cajon Pass at the San Andreas fault eastward to the Colorado Desert. The central and eastern segments (near the San Andreas fault) have the highest elevations.

Most of the ranges lie in the California chaparral and woodlands ecoregion. Lower elevations are dominated by chaparral and scrubland, while higher elevations support large conifer forests. Most of the ranges in the system are fault blocks, and were uplifted by tectonic movements late in the Cenozoic Era. West of Tejon Pass, the primary rock types are varied, with a mix of sedimentary, volcanic, and metamorphic rocks, while regions east of the pass are dominated by plutonic granitic and metasedimentary rocks.

== Geography ==
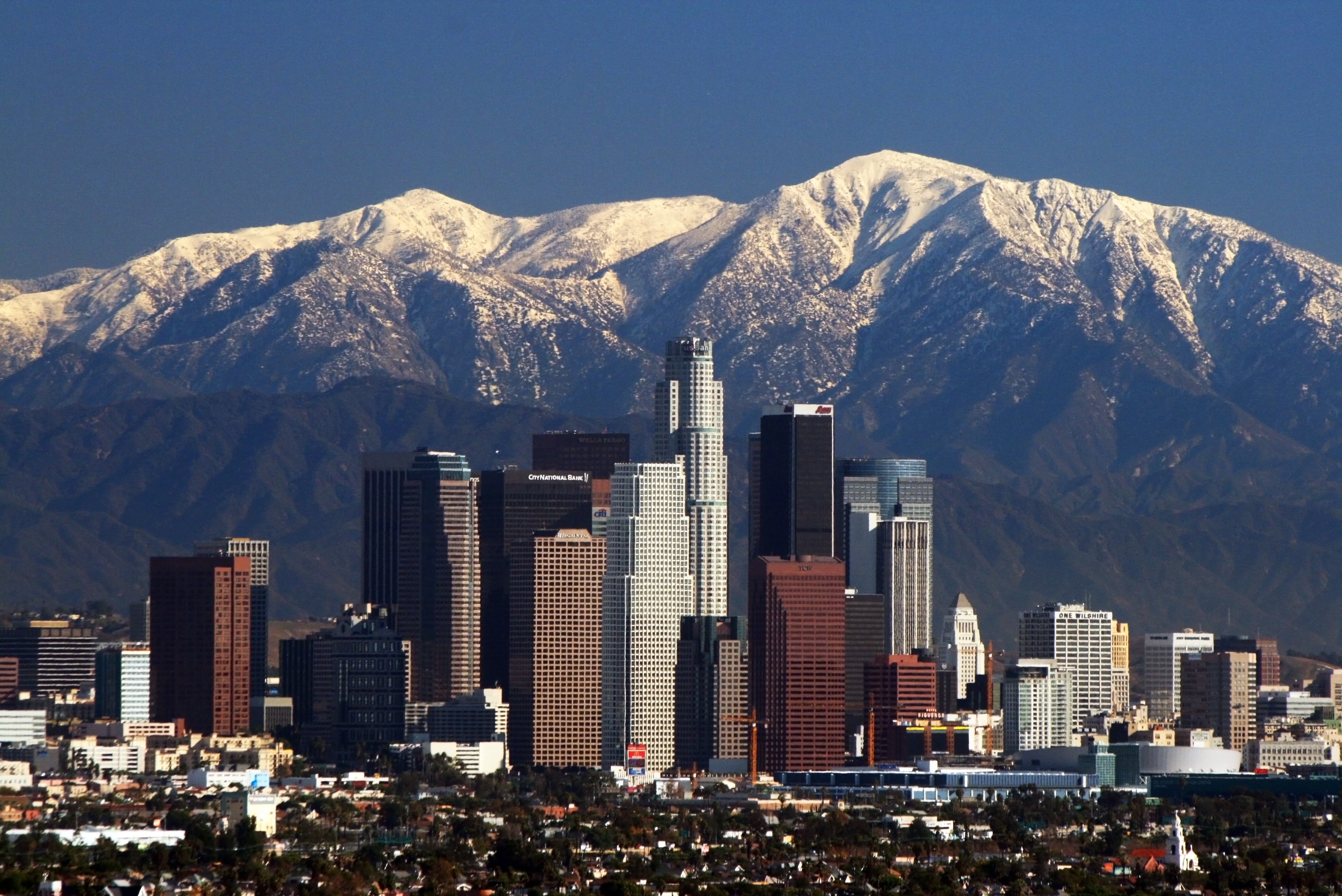
The Ranges rise steeply above major urban areas such as Los Angeles

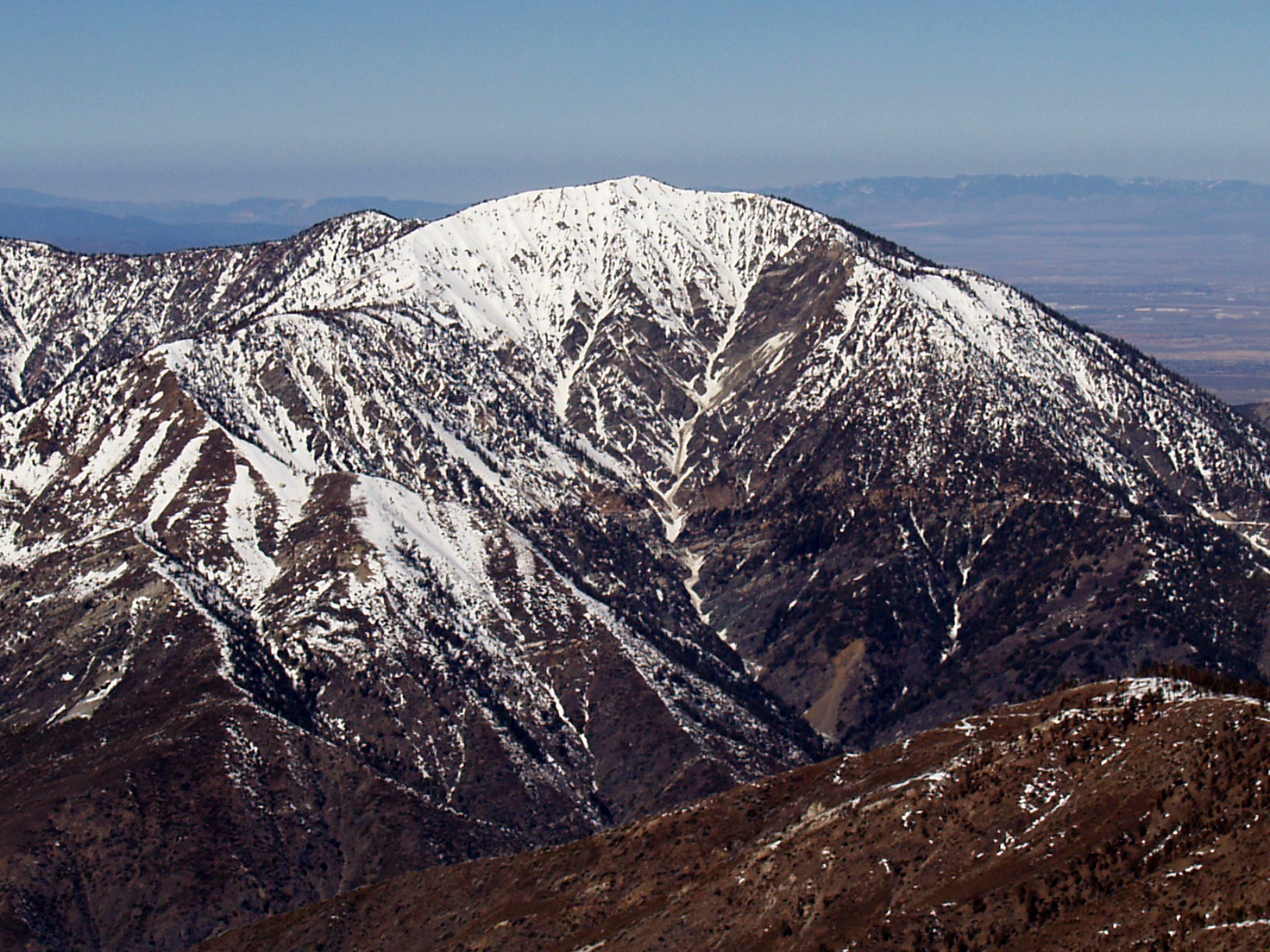
Snowy Mt. Baden-Powell in the San Gabriel Mountains

The western and central segments of the Transverse Ranges are bounded to the north and east by the San Andreas Fault, which separates those segments from the Mojave Desert. The eastern segment bounds the southern Mojave Desert. Notable passes along the San Andreas fault include Tejon Pass, Cajon Pass, and San Gorgonio Pass. Components of Transverse Ranges to the north and east of the fault include the San Bernardino Mountains, Little San Bernardino Mountains, Pinto and Eagle Mountains. The western and southern boundaries are acknowledged to be the Pacific Ocean and the northern Channel Islands. Onshore the Los Angeles Basin lies at the southern boundary of the western and central segments of the ranges. Major passes not along the San Andreas Fault include Gaviota Pass, San Marcos Pass, the Conejo Grade, Newhall Pass, and Cahuenga Pass.

The Transverse Ranges manifest themselves as a series of roughly parallel ridges with an average height of 3,000–8,000 feet (900–2,400 m). The ranges are dissected by young, steep streams of relatively low flow rate; as a result, there is high topographic relief throughout the range, and other than in marginal areas (e.g. the San Fernando Valley) and a few river valleys (such as Lockwood Valley and Big Bear Valley), there are no large, flat basins within the ranges.

The mountains are notable for being steep and difficult to traverse. There are few passes that are sufficiently low or wide enough to accommodate significant volumes of traffic. This has resulted in situations where major cities are linked to the rest of the state by relatively few roads; for example, the vast majority of traffic between the Central Valley and the Los Angeles area is routed through Tejon Pass. This results in significant traffic issues throughout Southern California when a pass has to be shut down due to heavy snow or construction. Occasionally, major cities, such as Santa Barbara during the 2005 La Conchita landslide and the 2018 Southern California mudflows, may be cut off from timely road access to the rest of Southern California.

=== Peaks ===
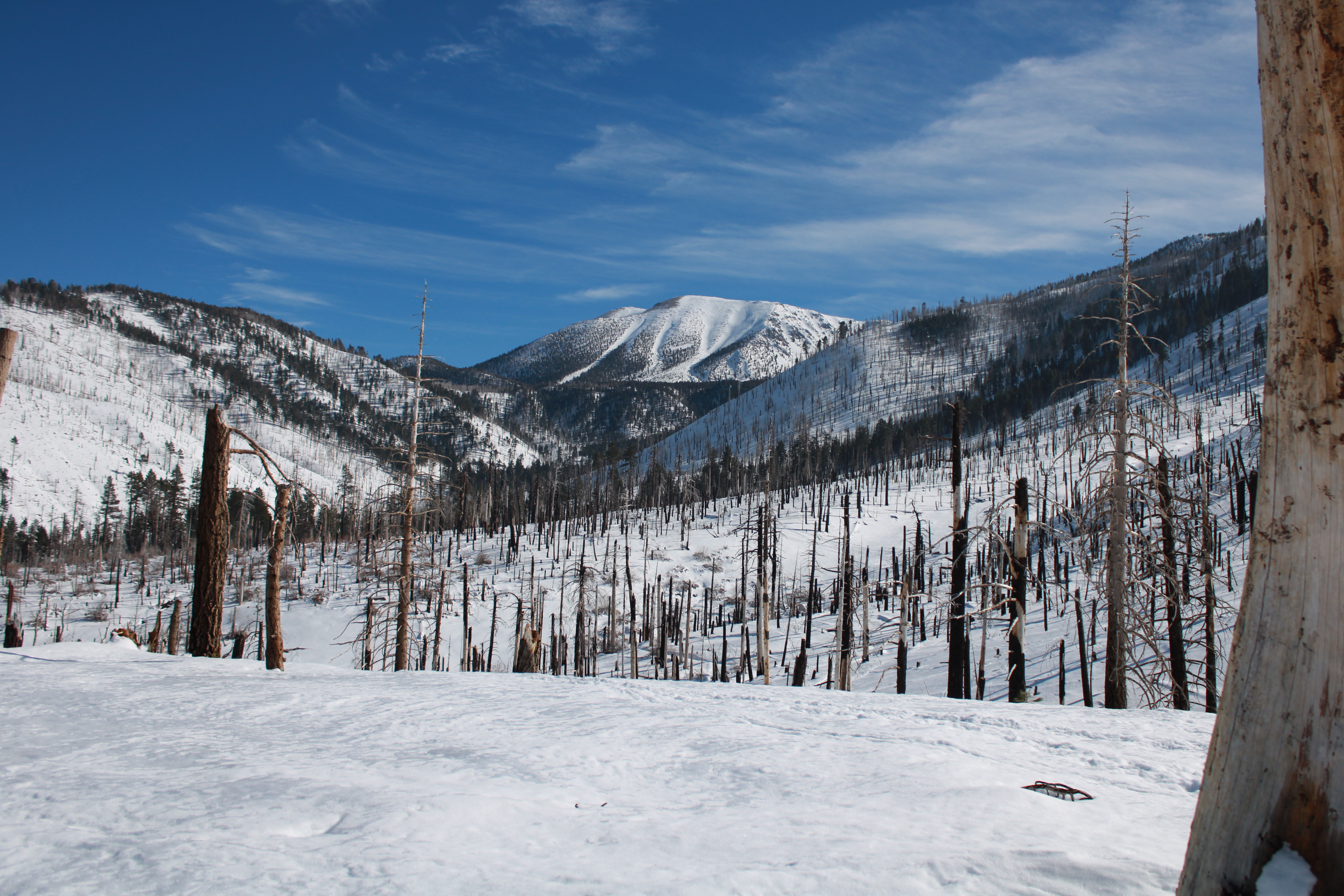
Mt. San Gorgonio in the center of frame, highest peak in Transverse Ranges

Major peaks of the Transverse Ranges with at least 500 feet (150 m) of prominence, listed by height:

1. Mount San Gorgonio, 11,503 feet (3,506 m), San Bernardino Mountains.
2. Anderson Peak, 10,840 feet (3,300 m), San Bernardino Mountains.
3. Mount San Antonio (Old Baldy), 10,068 feet (3,069 m), San Gabriel Mountains.
4. Sugarloaf Mountain, 9,952 feet (3,033 m), San Bernardino Mountains.
5. Mount Baden-Powell, 9,407 feet (2,867 m), San Gabriel Mountains.
6. Galena Peak, 9,324 feet (2,842 m), San Bernardino Mountains.
7. Throop Peak, 9,142 feet (2,786 m), San Gabriel Mountains.
8. Telegraph Peak, 8,985 feet (2,739 m), San Gabriel Mountains.
9. Cucamonga Peak, 8,862 feet (2,701 m), San Gabriel Mountains.
10. Mount Pinos, 8,847 feet (2,697 m).
11. Ontario Peak, 8,693 feet (2,650 m), San Gabriel Mountains.
12. Delamar Mountain, 8,402 feet (2,561 m), San Bernardino Mountains.
13. Cerro Noroeste, 8,280 feet (2,520 m).
14. Mount Islip, 8,254 feet (2,516 m), San Gabriel Mountains.
15. Gold Mountain, 8,239 feet (2,511 m), San Bernardino Mountains.
16. Bertha Peak, 8,205 feet (2,501 m), San Bernardino Mountains.
17. Frazier Mountain, 8,017 feet (2,444 m).
18. Iron Mountain #1, 8,010 feet (2,440 m), San Gabriel Mountains.
19. Reyes Peak, 7,510 feet (2,290 m), Pine Mountain Ridge.
20. Haddock Mountain, 7,431 feet (2,265 m), Pine Mountain Ridge.

=== Ranges ===
==== Western segment ====
This segment begins at Point Conception in Santa Barbara County, and include the Santa Ynez Mountains that run parallel to the coast behind Santa Barbara and the San Rafael Mountains on the other side of the Santa Ynez Valley. The western Transverse Ranges also include the Topatopa Mountains and the Santa Susana Mountains of Ventura County and Los Angeles County, the Simi Hills, the Santa Monica Mountains that run along the Pacific coast behind Malibu, and whose eastern portion are known as the Hollywood Hills, and the Chalk Hills. The northern Channel Islands of California are also part of the Transverse Ranges; San Miguel, Santa Rosa, Santa Cruz and Anacapa Islands are a westward extension of the Santa Monica Mountains.

==== Central segment ====
The Ranges include the steep San Gabriel Mountains northeast of Los Angeles, the Sierra Pelona Mountains just south of the San Andreas fault, the Tehachapi Mountains southeast of Bakersfield, the Verdugo Mountains, the Liebre-Sawmill Mountains, the San Rafael Hills, Puente Hills, San Jose Hills, and Chino Hills.

==== Eastern segment ====
The San Bernardino Mountains, Little San Bernardino Mountains, and the Pinto, Eagle, and Orocopia Mountains are within the eastern segment. The Mojave Desert and California's low desert, including the Coachella Valley, are at the eastern end of the ranges.

Ranges north of the western segment that are nearly transverse but are part of the California Coast Ranges include the San Rafael Mountains and the Sierra Madre Mountains. Likewise, the Tehachapi Mountains north of the Mojave Desert, although nearly transverse, are the southern end of the Sierra Nevada.

==== Component ranges ====
Mountain ranges with peaks exceeding 4,500 feet (1,400 m), listed west to east, include:

- Santa Ynez Mountains
- San Rafael Mountains
- Pine Mountain Ridge
- San Emigdio Mountains
- Topatopa Mountains
- Sierra Pelona Ridge
- San Gabriel Mountains
- San Bernardino Mountains
- Little San Bernardino Mountains

Examples of smaller mountain and hill ranges include:

- Santa Monica Mountains
- Santa Susana Mountains
- Simi Hills
- Chalk Hills
- Indio Hills
- San Rafael Hills
- Puente Hills
- San Jose Hills
- Shandin Hills

=== Climate ===
The climate in most of the range is Csb (Warm-summer Mediterranean) under the Köppen climate classification; the upper reaches of San Gorgonio Mountain have an alpine tundra climate (ET), while the lower northern slopes of the range have a desert (BW) or steppe (BS) climate; most of the nearby lowlands to the south and west have a Hot-summer Mediterranean climate (Csa).

Snow falls above 6,000 feet (1,800 m) most winters, and above 3,000 feet (900 m) every few years. It is rare for elevations above 8,000 feet (2,000 m) to go multiple winters without snow, even during severe droughts. Due to relatively low humidity, the regional snow line lies at about 14,000–16,000 feet (4,000–5,000 m), above the highest elevation of the range; as such, snow does not persist year-round except in the form of snow patches.

The tree line lies at about 11,000 feet (3,000 m); San Gorgonio Mountain is the only peak with an alpine environment.

Climate data for Big Bear Lake, California, (1991–2020 normals, extremes 1914–present)
Month	Jan	Feb	Mar	Apr	May	Jun	Jul	Aug	Sep	Oct	Nov	Dec	Year
Record high °F (°C)	71 (22)	72 (22)	80 (27)	82 (28)	87 (31)	98 (37)	94 (34)	93 (34)	90 (32)	85 (29)	74 (23)	72 (22)	98 (37)
Mean maximum °F (°C)	60.1 (15.6)	60.3 (15.7)	65.1 (18.4)	72.2 (22.3)	78.4 (25.8)	85.8 (29.9)	88.7 (31.5)	86.5 (30.3)	82.1 (27.8)	75.5 (24.2)	68.3 (20.2)	61.8 (16.6)	89.8 (32.1)
Mean daily maximum °F (°C)	46.1 (7.8)	45.7 (7.6)	51.2 (10.7)	57.3 (14.1)	65.8 (18.8)	75.1 (23.9)	79.7 (26.5)	78.7 (25.9)	73.0 (22.8)	63.4 (17.4)	53.5 (11.9)	46.2 (7.9)	61.3 (16.3)
Daily mean °F (°C)	34.3 (1.3)	34.3 (1.3)	38.9 (3.8)	44.1 (6.7)	51.3 (10.7)	59.3 (15.2)	65.1 (18.4)	64.1 (17.8)	58.5 (14.7)	49.0 (9.4)	40.4 (4.7)	34.3 (1.3)	47.8 (8.8)
Mean daily minimum °F (°C)	22.7 (−5.2)	22.9 (−5.1)	26.5 (−3.1)	30.8 (−0.7)	36.8 (2.7)	43.5 (6.4)	50.5 (10.3)	49.5 (9.7)	44.0 (6.7)	34.6 (1.4)	27.4 (−2.6)	22.6 (−5.2)	34.3 (1.3)
Mean minimum °F (°C)	8.8 (−12.9)	9.8 (−12.3)	14.1 (−9.9)	20.1 (−6.6)	27.0 (−2.8)	33.4 (0.8)	40.8 (4.9)	40.0 (4.4)	32.5 (0.3)	24.5 (−4.2)	15.4 (−9.2)	10.1 (−12.2)	4.9 (−15.1)
Record low °F (°C)	−25 (−32)	−16 (−27)	−12 (−24)	−7 (−22)	15 (−9)	22 (−6)	28 (−2)	28 (−2)	19 (−7)	10 (−12)	−15 (−26)	−14 (−26)	−25 (−32)
Average precipitation inches (mm)	4.51 (115)	4.39 (112)	2.37 (60)	0.78 (20)	0.42 (11)	0.15 (3.8)	0.69 (18)	0.82 (21)	0.40 (10)	0.79 (20)	1.35 (34)	3.31 (84)	19.98 (508.8)
Average snowfall inches (cm)	13.4 (34)	14.3 (36)	11.7 (30)	3.0 (7.6)	0.6 (1.5)	0.0 (0.0)	0.0 (0.0)	0.0 (0.0)	0.0 (0.0)	1.2 (3.0)	3.4 (8.6)	11.0 (28)	58.6 (148.7)
Average precipitation days (≥ 0.01 in)	6.6	6.8	5.5	3.7	2.0	0.7	2.6	2.8	2.0	2.2	2.9	5.5	43.3
Average snowy days (≥ 0.1 in)	3.5	3.5	2.7	1.2	0.3	0.1	0.0	0.0	0.0	0.3	1.1	3.3	16.0
Source: NOAA

== Geology ==
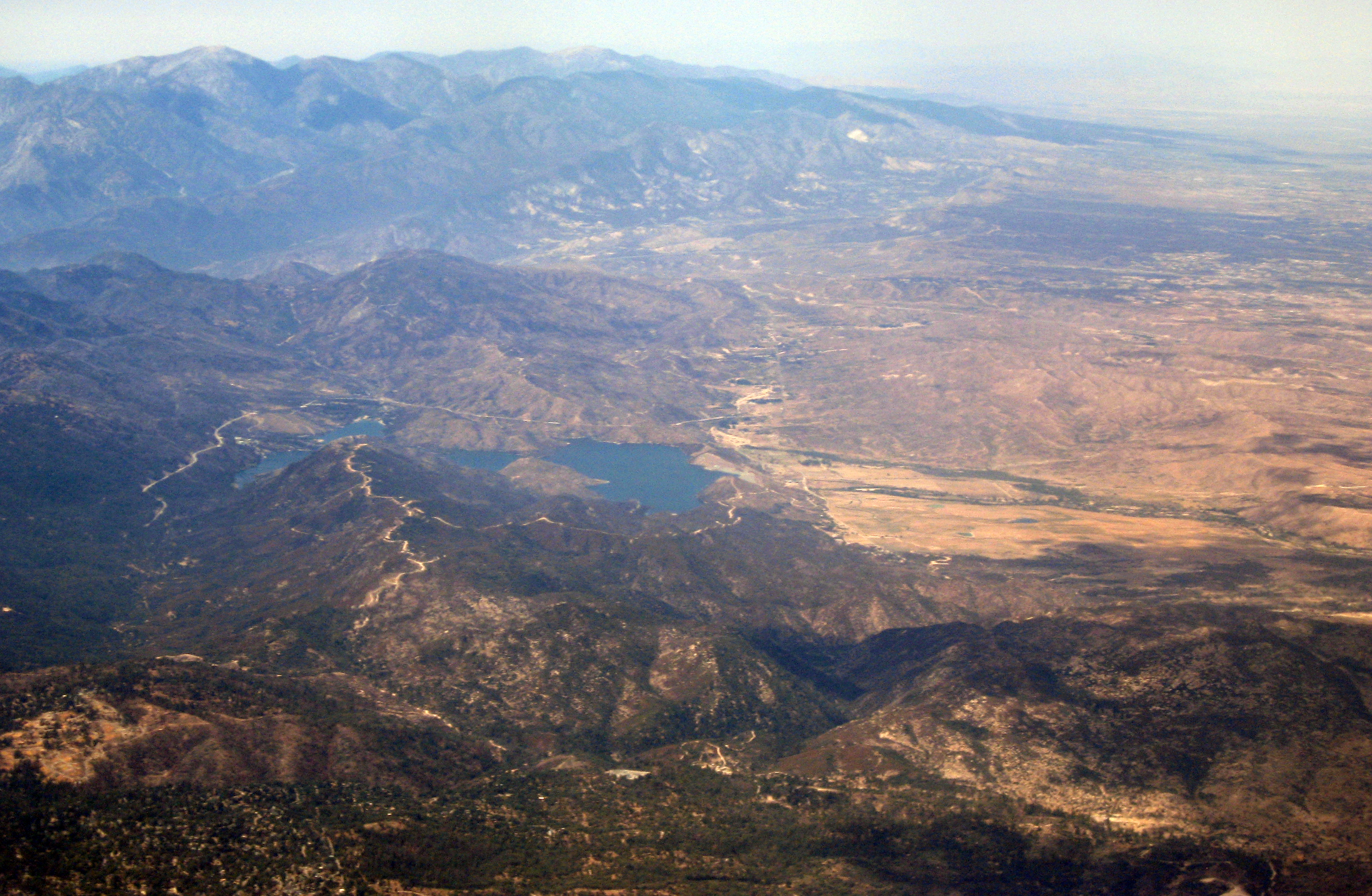
View west of the eastern portion of the San Bernardino and San Gabriel Mountains, with the Mojave Desert on the right and Silverwood Lake near the boundary. The San Andreas Fault runs straight up the middle toward the horizon.

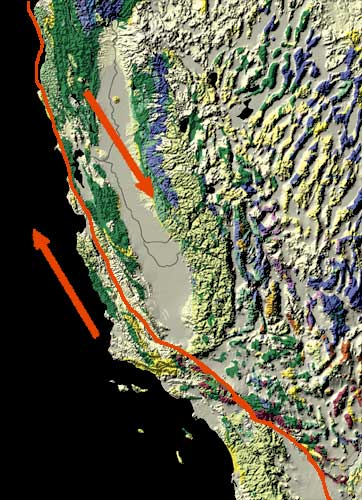
The San Andreas Fault trends more east-west where it cuts through the Transverse Ranges.

=== Tectonics ===
The Transverse Ranges result from a complex of tectonic forces and faulting stemming from the interaction of the Pacific Plate and the North American Plate along the dextral (right slip) San Andreas Fault system. Their orientation along an east–west axis as opposed to the general northwest–southeast trend of most California ranges results from a pronounced left step in the San Andreas Fault that occurred in the Pliocene (c. 4 million years ago) when southern reaches of the fault moved east to open the Gulf of California. The crust within the Pacific Plate south of the ranges can not easily make the left turn westward as the entire plate moves northwestward, forcing pieces of the crust to compress and lift.

Prior to this shift of the fault to create the left bend, northwest–southeast trending rock belts in all of the Transverse Ranges began to rotate clockwise in the right shear of Pacific Plate – North American Plate motion. This tectonic rotation began in Early Miocene Time and continues today. The total rotation is about 90° in the Western Transverse Ranges and less (about 40°) in the eastern ranges. Catalina Island shows the most rotation: almost 120°.

A mechanism proposed for the rotation event is capture of the subducting Monterey plate by the outboard Pacific plate. Because the Monterey plate was then beneath southern California, the capture resulted in pulling of the overlying crust out and northward from the rest of California.

=== Rocks ===
Rocks of the Transverse Ranges exhibit extreme differences in geologic age and composition, varying from sedimentary rocks in the western Santa Ynez and volcanic rocks in the Santa Monica Mountains to primarily granitic and metamorphic rock in the central and eastern segments, including the San Gabriel and San Bernardino Mountains.

The oldest basement (deepest) rocks are of Proterozoic age, and are found in the San Gabriel Mountains and the San Bernardino Mountains. The Jurassic-Cretaceous Franciscan Assemblage is found in the western section of the ranges and is the presumed basement in this segment. Exposed plutonic rocks from the Mesozoic, mostly granites, can be found on Mount Pinos and generally in regions east of Tejon Pass. The youngest rocks are Cenozoic sedimentary and volcanic rocks that can be found throughout the ranges.

The western segment is distinctive for the large thickness of Cretaceous and Cenozoic sedimentary rocks, estimated to be up to 10 kilometers. The thickest deposits of these are in the Santa Barbara Channel and Ventura basin. These are mostly marine in origin with a marked change to red beds of river systems of Oligocene age in the western and central segments.

Limestones and dolomites of the marine Miocene Monterey Formation are found in the Santa Ynez Mountains and in the Coast Ranges to the north.

=== Faults ===
Transverse Ranges segments shown as shaded with bordering faults. Catalina not usually included in the province but it has similar geologic faults.

The distinctive feature of the Transverse Ranges besides their anomalous orientation is that they are bounded by east-west trending faults. Most are left slip, strike slip faults. In the western and central segments many of the faults are thrust faults. Faults in the Coast Ranges and Peninsular Ranges trend northwest-southeast and butt into the east-west trending faults of the Transverse Ranges. Because all of these faults are considered active and seismic but they do to cut each other, the only geometry that satisfies that observation is if the east-west faults and Transverse Ranges are rotating clockwise with respect to the faults outside that province.

Between the western segment and the Peninsular Ranges to the south is the complex Malibu Coast—Santa Monica—Hollywood fault, which exists as the border between these two mostly geologically unitary provinces. These faults are part of the same thrust fault system south of the northern Channel Islands of San Miguel, Santa Rosa, and Anacapa Islands. North of the western segment the bounding faults are left slip Santa Ynez and Pine Mountain Faults. The San Gabriel Fault and San Andreas bound the central segment. The eastern segment is bounded by the Pinto Mountain Fault in the north and the Salton Creek Fault in the south.

=== Petroleum ===
The large thickness of marine sediments in the western segment have made it a habitat for oil. Several dozen fields are found onshore and offshore, particularly in the Santa Barbara Channel and Ventura Basin. Much oil has pooled in the Monterey Formation, which is produced onshore and offshore. In the eastern Santa Barbara Channel oil is held in younger sedimentary rocks. The Los Angeles Basin south of the western segment, formed during rotation of that segment away from the Peninsular Ranges. It is also a site of prolific oil production. The California Geologic Survey states:

Great thicknesses of Cenozoic petroleum-rich sedimentary rocks have been folded and faulted, making California one of the most important oil-producing areas in the United States.

== Ecology ==
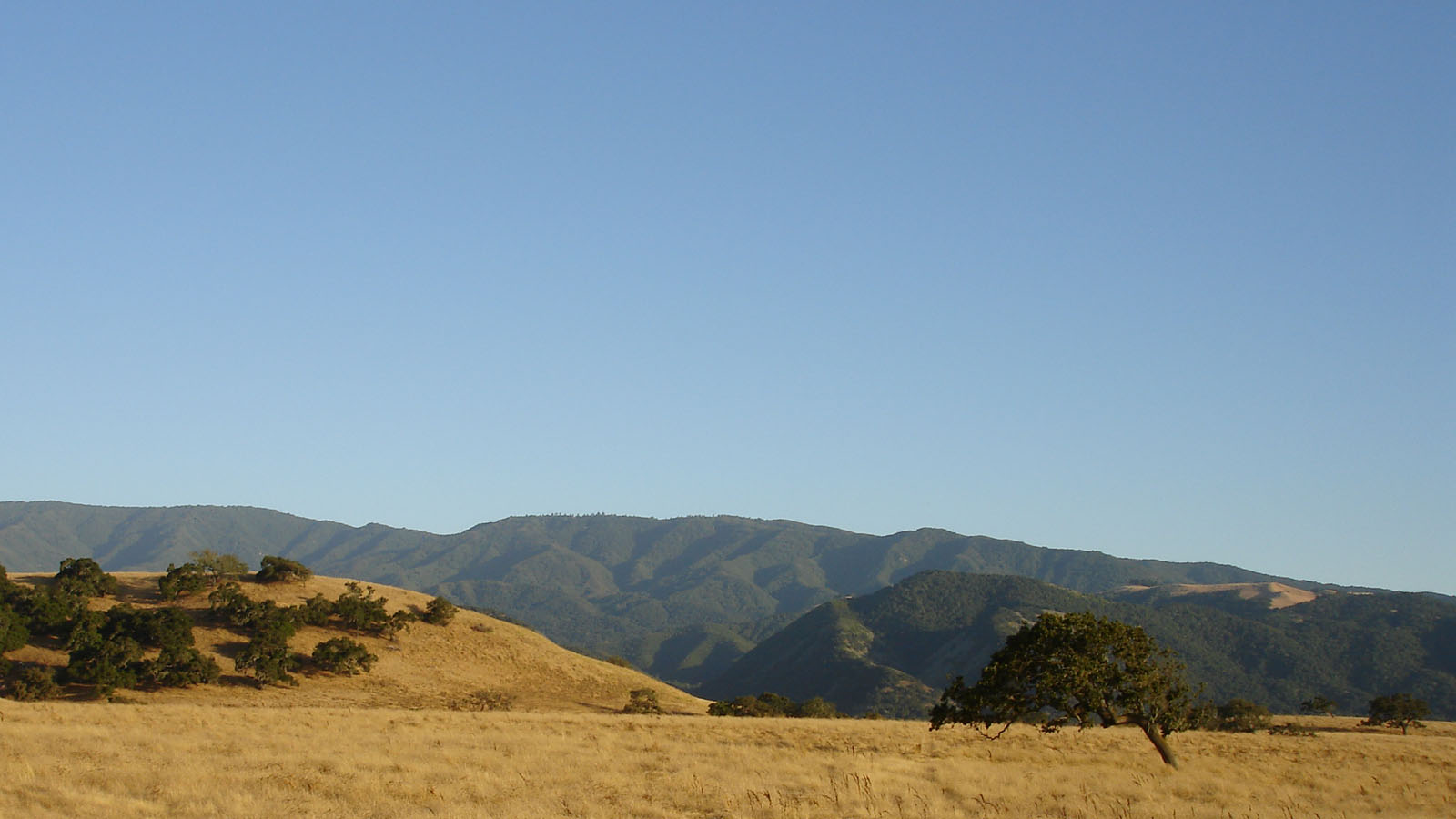
Savannah-like oak woodlands are typical of the westernmost ranges; shown here is the north slope of the Santa Ynez Mountains

The plant place of the Transverse ranges include coastal sage scrub, oak woodland and savanna, and pinyon-juniper woodland at lower elevations, and yellow pine forest, Lodgepole Pine, and subalpine forest at higher elevations. The Angeles and Los Padres National Forests cover portions of the Transverse ranges. The ranges are part of the WWF-designated California montane chaparral and woodlands ecoregion, but the eastern points of the range touch two desert regions, the Mojave Desert and the Colorado Desert section of the Sonoran Desert. The Carrizo Plain adjoins the northern edge of the Transverse Range.

Chaparral is a common feature of the Transverse Ranges. Common plant associates in chaparral, especially in the transition between coastal chaparral and coastal sage scrub, include California sagebrush and Toyon, the latter shrub having its southern distribution limit defined by the Transverse Ranges.

Pinyon-juniper woodland is common on the north slopes of the San Gabriel and San Bernardino Mountains. This ecosystem is easily visible in the well-travelled Soledad Pass region, between Pearblossom and Santa Clarita.

=== Urban impact ===
A number of densely populated coastal plains and interior valleys lie between the mountain ranges, including the Oxnard Plain of coastal Ventura County, the Santa Clarita Valley north of Los Angeles, the San Fernando Valley, which is mostly included in the City of Los Angeles. The Los Angeles Basin, which includes the portion of Los Angeles County south of the Santa Monica Mountains and most of Orange County, and the Inland Empire basin, which includes the counties of San Bernardino and Riverside, lie between the Transverse Ranges and the Peninsular Ranges to the south.

== Transportation ==
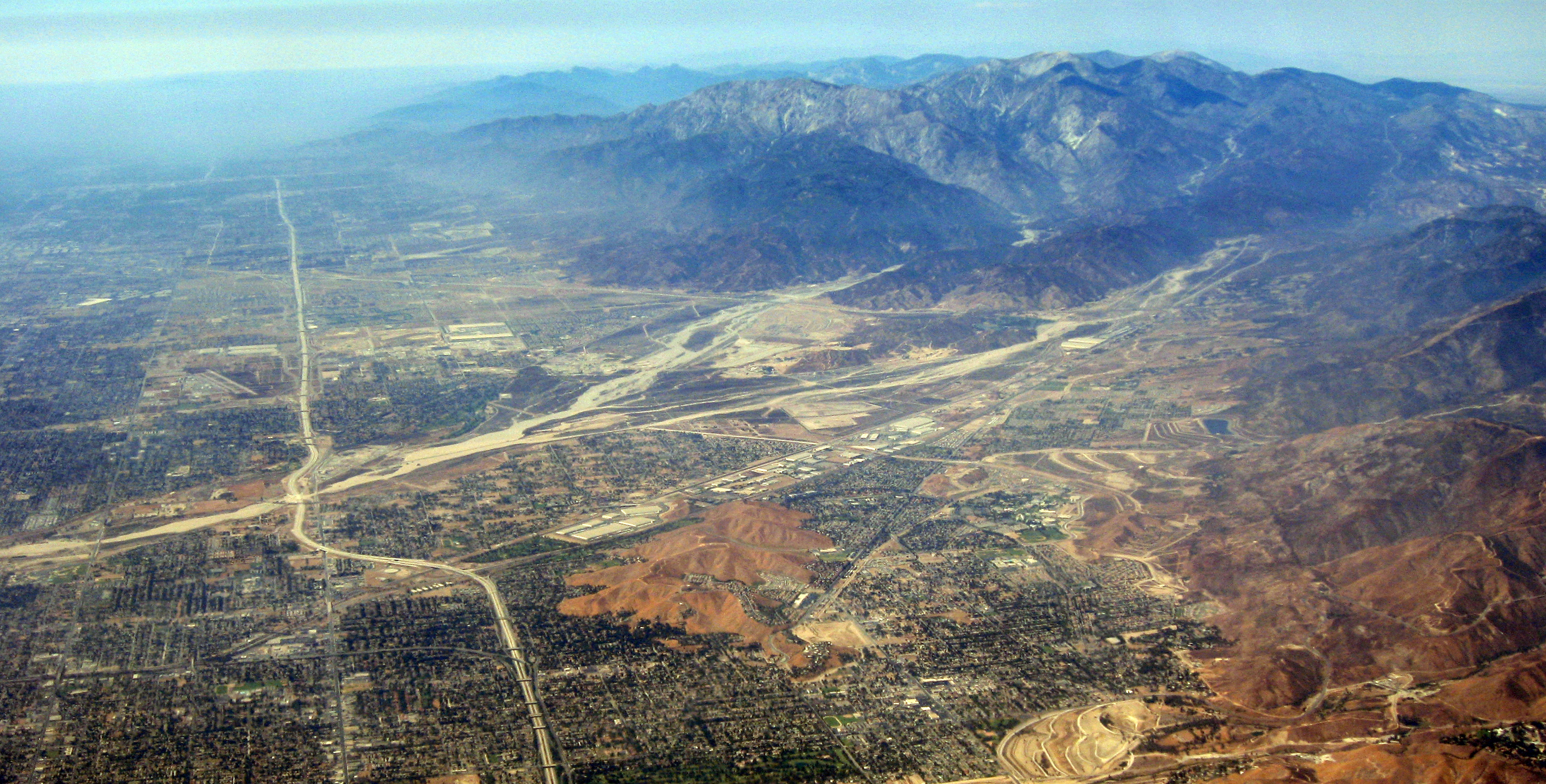
View looking westward at the western portion of the San Bernardino and San Gabriel Mountains, with the San Bernardino Valley to the left, with San Bernardino itself in the foreground. The Foothill Freeway (I-210) runs toward the horizon, while I-15 runs through Cajon Pass to the right.

There are a number of important freeways that cross the Transverse Ranges, such as (from west to east) US-101, I-5 at Tejon Pass, SR 14 at Soledad Pass, and I-15 at Cajon Pass. These highways link Southern California with places to the north and northeast like San Francisco and Las Vegas, respectively. With the exception of several high passes on less-traveled SR 33, SR 2, SR 330. SR 18 and SR 38, none of these passes are at high elevations, with Cajon Pass being at a modest 4,190 ft (1,277 m) above mean sea level; this means that snow is less of a factor here than in the moderate to high mountain passes to the north like Donner Pass. Still sometimes, heavy snowfall can snarl traffic on Tejon and Cajon Pass, the higher two of the three freeway passes. I-5 and I-15 commonly experience heavy traffic over their mountainous route across these mountains.

== See also ==
- Southern California faults
- Transverse Ranges topics index
