= Ray James Weldon II =

American geologist

Ray J. Weldon II
- Born: Ray James Weldon II; 1955 (age 70–71)
- Education: Pomona College (BA); California Institute of Technology (PhD)
- Known for: Paleoseismology of the San Andreas Fault; Uniform California Earthquake Rupture Forecast (UCERF3)
- Awards: Fellow, Geological Society of America (2020)
- Scientific career
- Fields: Geology, paleoseismology, neotectonics, seismic hazard
- Workplaces: University of Oregon; United States Geological Survey
- Thesis: The Late Cenozoic Geology of Cajon Pass; Implications for Tectonics and Sedimentation along the San Andreas Fault (1986)
- Doctoral advisor: Kerry Sieh

Ray James Weldon II (born 1955) is an American geologist who is an emeritus professor in the Department of Earth Sciences at the University of Oregon. His research has focused on active fault systems, earthquake recurrence, structural geology and seismic hazards. His field investigations have included fault systems in the western United States as well as parts of Central and Southeast Asia. His work has contributed to the understanding of the earthquake history of the San Andreas Fault and to the development of earthquake rupture forecasts used in seismic hazard assessment and for contributions to the Uniform California Earthquake Rupture Forecast (UCERF) and United States national seismic-hazard assessments. Weldon was elected a Fellow of the Geological Society of America (GSA) in 2020.

== Early life and education ==
Weldon studied geology at Pomona College, graduating in 1977, and completed a Ph.D. in geology at the California Institute of Technology in 1986. His doctoral research investigated the late Cenozoic evolution of Cajon Pass and its implications for the tectonic development of the San Andreas Fault.

== Career ==
After completing his doctorate, Weldon worked as a research geologist at the United States Geological Survey earthquake office in Menlo Park, California, from 1986 to 1988. Following his appointment at the United States Geological Survey, Weldon joined the University of Oregon faculty in 1988, where he later became professor of structural geology and served as department head between 2010 and 2013. He has also held visiting appointments overseas, including at the Earth Observatory of Singapore.

== Research ==
Weldon's research combines geological mapping, paleoseismic trench investigations, geochronology and geodetic observations to study the history of active faults and evaluate long-term earthquake recurrence. A significant portion of his research examined the paleoseismic record of the San Andreas Fault, including investigations at Wrightwood and later studies near Coachella that reconstructed approximately one millennium of earthquake activity.The Coachella investigations indicated that the southern segment of the San Andreas Fault had remained inactive for longer than its average prehistoric recurrence interval, although Weldon emphasized that such findings should not be interpreted as predictions of an imminent earthquake.

Weldon has contributed to statewide and national seismic-hazard assessments, serving on the U.S. Geological Survey's National Seismic Hazard Map advisory committees and on the Working Group on California Earthquake Probabilities, whose forecasts are used by the USGS, the Southern California Earthquake Center and the California Geological Survey. In later years his research expanded to include the Cascadia subduction zone together with studies of active tectonic regions in China, Kyrgyzstan and mainland Southeast Asia.

== Selected publications ==
- Weldon, R. J.; Sieh, K. E. (1985). "Holocene rate of slip and tentative recurrence interval for large earthquakes on the San Andreas fault, Cajon Pass, southern California". Geological Society of America Bulletin. 96 (6): 793–812.
- Weldon, R. J.; Humphreys, E. D. (1986). "A kinematic model of southern California". Tectonics. 5 (1): 33–48. doi:10.1029/TC005i001p00033.
- Fumal, T. E.; Pezzopane, S. K.; Weldon, R. J.; Schwartz, D. P. (1993). "A 100-year average recurrence interval for the San Andreas fault at Wrightwood, California". Science. 259 (5092): 199–203.
- Weldon, R.; Fumal, T.; Biasi, G.; Scharer, K. (2005). "Past and future earthquakes on the San Andreas fault". Science. 308 (5724): 966–967.
- Field, E. H.; et al. (2009). "Uniform California Earthquake Rupture Forecast, Version 2 (UCERF 2)". Bulletin of the Seismological Society of America. 99 (4): 2053–2107.
- Scharer, K. M.; Biasi, G. P.; Weldon, R. J.; Fumal, T. E. (2010). "Quasi-periodic recurrence of large earthquakes on the southern San Andreas fault". Geology. 38 (6): 555–558.
- Philibosian, B.; Fumal, T. E.; Weldon, R. J. (2011). "San Andreas Fault earthquake chronology and Lake Cahuilla history at Coachella, California". Bulletin of the Seismological Society of America. 101 (1).
- Field, E. H.; et al. (2014). "Uniform California Earthquake Rupture Forecast, Version 3 (UCERF3) — The Time-Independent Model". Bulletin of the Seismological Society of America.
- Curtiss, E. R.; Weldon, R. J. II; Egger, A. E. (2024). "Paleoseismic investigation of the Thousand Springs Fault, Northwestern Basin and Range, Oregon". Bulletin of the Seismological Society of America. 114 (5): 2713–2733.

== Awards and honours ==
- Fellow, Geological Society of America (2020)
- National Science Foundation Presidential Young Investigator Award (1990)

== Professional service ==
Throughout his career, Weldon has participated in advisory groups concerned with seismic hazard assessment, including committees associated with the U.S. Geological Survey and the Working Group on California Earthquake Probabilities. He has also directed the University of Oregon's summer geology field camp and taught field schools in Southeast Asia and Central Asia.
