= Southern California faults =

Seismic fault lines in southern California

Simplified fault map of southern California

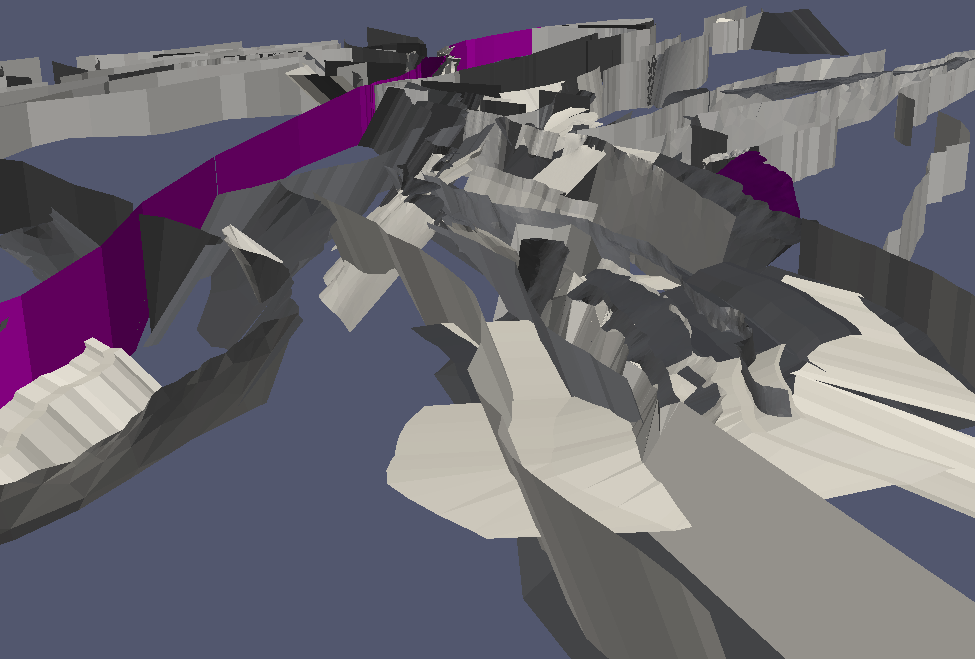
The faults of Southern California viewed to the southeast, as modeled by the Southern California Earthquake Center. Highlighted in purple are the San Andreas Fault (left) and Santa Monica Bay complex (right). The foreground is in the Santa Barbara Channel, the east-trending zone marks the Transverse Range. Faults in the upper left are part of the Eastern California Shear Zone, connecting northward with the Walker Lane region. Faults extend deeper than shown.

Cumulative energy released by all earthquakes in Southern California from 1932 through July 2014. Highest energy in red, the lowest energy in dark blue. Data from the Southern California Earthquake Center. (Click on an icon for a larger image.)

"Map of faults in southern California," By Natural Hazards Mission Area Photographer, Kate Scharer, USGS Sources/Usage, Public Domain Accessed 10-20-2024

Most of central and northern California rests on a crustal block (terrane) that is being torn from the North American continent by the passing Pacific plate of oceanic crust. Southern California lies at the southern end of this block, where the Southern California faults create a complex and even chaotic landscape of seismic activity.

== Fault modeling ==
Seismic, geologic, and other data has been integrated by the Southern California Earthquake Center (renamed "Statewide California Earthquake Center" in October 2023) to produce the Community Fault Model (CFM) database that documents over 140 faults in southern California considered capable of producing moderate to large earthquakes. A three-dimensional (3D) model has been derived that can be viewed with suitable visualization software (see image). The probability of a serious earthquake on various faults has been estimated in the 2008 Uniform California Earthquake Rupture Forecast. According to the United States Geological Survey, Southern California experiences nearly 10,000 earthquakes every year. Details on specific faults can be found in the USGS Quaternary Fault and Fold Database.

== Historical earthquakes ==
Southern California faults have been responsible for many high magnitude and high-impact earthquakes.

- 2019 Ridgecrest earthquake
- 1999 Hector Mine earthquake
- 1994 Northridge earthquake
- 1992 Landers earthquake
- 1971 San Fernando earthquake
- 1952 Kern County earthquake
- 1933 Long Beach earthquake
- 1857 Fort Tejon earthquake

== Most active faults ==
- San Andreas Fault
- San Jacinto Fault Zone
- Elsinore Fault Zone
- Newport-Inglewood Fault
- Garlock Fault
- Puente Hills Fault
- Sierra Madre Fault Zone

== Effect on geography ==
Southern California's complex rock formations are a result of uplift by the region's active faults. The San Gabriel and San Bernardino Mountains gained their height from the displacement of brittle granite crust by the San Andreas and the Elsinore Faults. Movement of the Sierra Madre and Raymond Fault have both lifted the northern Los Angeles Basin while depressing the southern region. The close proximity of tall mountains and deep valleys in Southern California is a direct result of the closely nestled faults of the region.

== Effect on climate ==
The tall fault block mountains surrounding the Los Angeles region trap moisture and encourage rainfall. Without these natural barriers mediating the local climate, Los Angeles might be as dry and hot as the Eastern deserts of California. On the other hand, it has been noted that the encircling mountains tend to trap smog, causing it to accumulate in the populated region instead of moving out to sea or further inland.

== See also ==
- Basin and range topography
- Basin and Range Province
- California earthquake forecast (UCERF)
- Earthquake insurance
- List of earthquakes in California
- Plate tectonics
- Seismology
- Transverse Ranges
- Walker Lane
