= Pinto Mountains =

Mountain range of the Transverse Ranges in California, United States

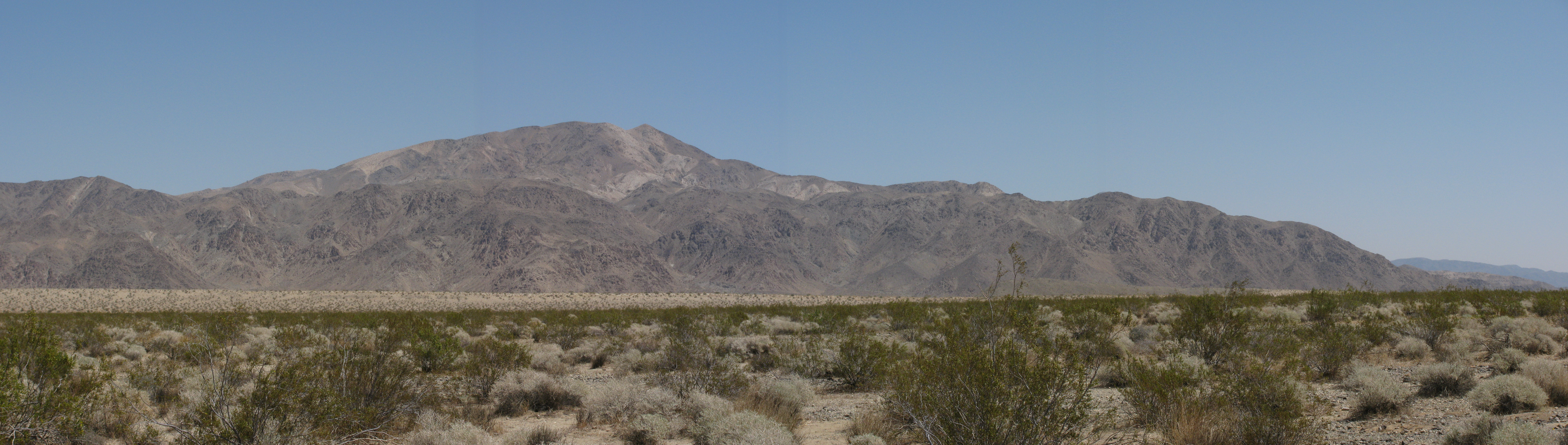
- The Pinto Mountains seen from the south

Highest point
- Elevation: 1,404 m (4,606 ft)
- Coordinates: 34.001883°N 115.999197°W

Dimensions
- Length: 28 mi (45 km) East-west
- Width: 11 mi (18 km) North-south

Geography
- Location within California
- Country: United States
- State: California
- District(s): Riverside County, San Bernardino County
- Range coordinates: 34°01′28″N 115°51′11″W
- Topo map(s): USGS Humbug Mountain, New Dale, Pinto Mountain, San Bernardino Wash, Malapai Hill, Fried Liver Wash, Queen Mountain, Twentynine Palms Mountain, Clarks Pass

The Pinto Mountains are in southern California, USA, at the north-central part of Joshua Tree National Park. Most of the range is in northern Riverside County; part is in southern San Bernardino County. The range reaches an elevation of 1,403 meters (4,603 ft) south-southeast of the city of Twentynine Palms. The range is made up of dark gneiss, and the creosote bush is the dominant plant in the area.

== Wilderness ==
Established in 2009 by the U.S. Congress, the Pinto Mountains Wilderness protects the rugged mountain range north of Joshua Tree National Park. The 24,348 acre desert wilderness area is managed by the U.S. Bureau of Land Management as part of the National Wilderness Preservation System. Some areas of the Pinto Mountains inside the national park are part of the Joshua Tree Wilderness and are managed by the National Park Service.
