= 1984 Morgan Hill earthquake =

Earthquake in San Francisco Bay Area, California

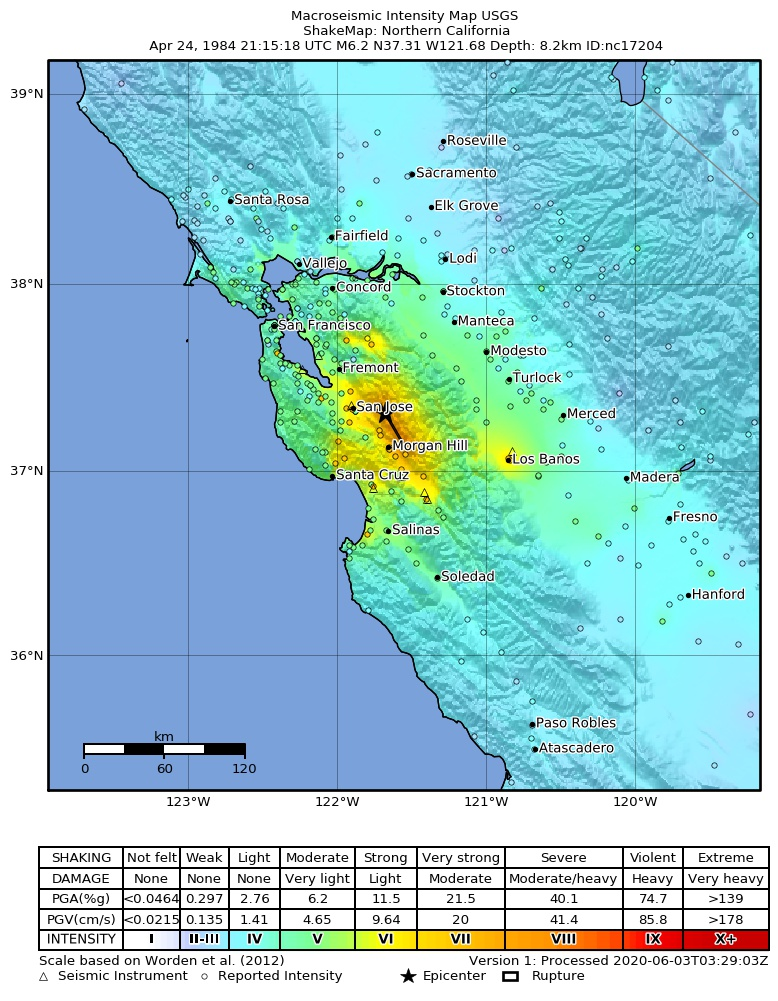
- USGS ShakeMap

- UTC time: 1984-04-24 21:15:21
- ISC event: 555788
- USGS-ANSS: ComCat
- Local date: April 24, 1984; 42 years ago
- Local time: 13:15:21 PST
- Magnitude: 6.2 M_{w}
- Depth: 10 km (6.2 mi)
- Epicenter: 37.28°N 121.76°W
- Fault: Calaveras Fault
- Type: Strike-slip
- Areas affected: South Bay; Northern California; United States
- Total damage: $7.5–8 million
- Max. intensity: MMI VIII (Severe)
- Peak acceleration: 1.3 g at Coyote Dam
- Landslides: Yes
- Casualties: 21–27 injured No fatalities

The 1984 Morgan Hill earthquake (also known as the Halls Valley earthquake) occurred on April 24 at 1:15 p.m. local time in the Santa Clara Valley of Northern California. The shock had a moment magnitude of 6.2 and a maximum Mercalli intensity of VIII (Severe). The epicenter was located near Mount Hamilton in the Diablo Range of the California Coast Ranges. Nearby communities (including Morgan Hill) sustained serious damage with financial losses of at least US$7.5 million.

== Earthquake ==
The earthquake occurred along the Calaveras Fault, with the epicenter 16 kilometers (9.9 mi) northeast of San Jose, and at a depth of 8 km (5.0 mi). The shock was felt in Sacramento in California's central valley.

=== Damage ===
The earthquake was reported to be felt over an area of 120,000 square kilometers (46,000 mi^{2}). Morgan Hill was the worst affected, with a number of mobile homes sliding off foundations, and moderate damage to several masonry buildings in the city. The communities of San Jose, San Martin and Coyote were some areas that experienced minor damage. In Santa Clara County, over 550 buildings were reported to have received at least minor damage.

=== Aftershocks ===
The outline of aftershocks show that the rupture propagated southeast over a 25 km (16 mi) section of the fault, as far as San Martin, to the location of the 1979 Coyote Lake earthquake's mainshock. That event's aftershock zone also stretched to the southeast.

== See also ==
- List of earthquakes in California
