= Earthquake insurance =

Form of property insurance

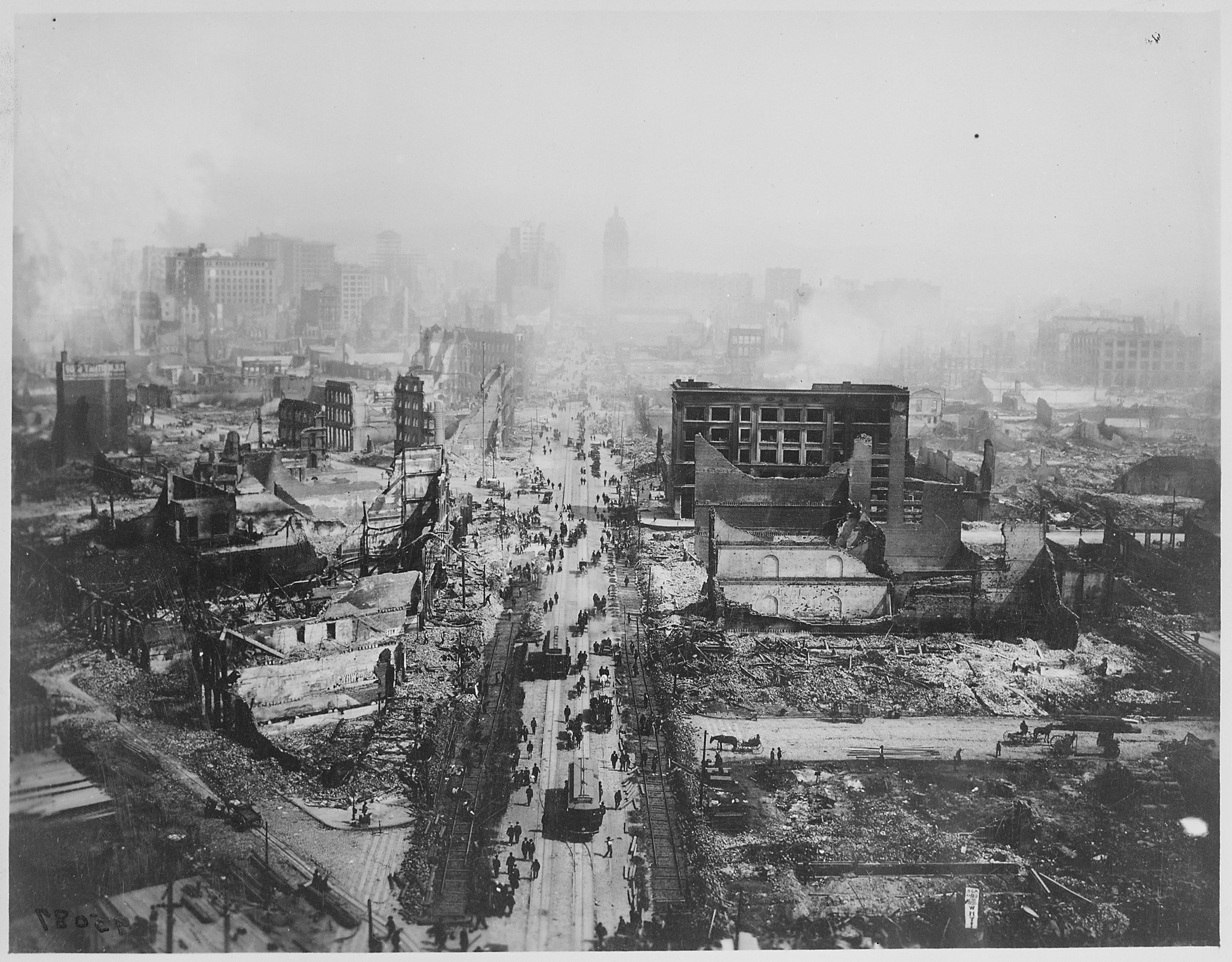
1906 San Francisco earthquake

Earthquake insurance is a form of property insurance that pays the policyholder in the event of an earthquake that causes damage to the property. Most ordinary homeowners insurance policies do not cover earthquake damage.

Most earthquake insurance policies feature a high deductible, which makes this type of insurance useful if the entire home is destroyed, but not useful if the home is merely damaged. Rates depend on location and the probability of an earthquake loss. Rates may be lower for homes made of wood, which withstand earthquakes better than homes made of brick.

In the past, earthquake loss was assessed using a collection of mass inventory data and was based mostly on experts' opinions. Today it is estimated using a Damage Ratio (DR), a ratio of the earthquake damage money amount to the total value of a building. Another method is the use of HAZUS, a computerized procedure for loss estimation.

As with flood insurance or insurance on damage from a hurricane or other large-scale disasters, insurance companies must be careful when assigning this type of insurance, because an earthquake strong enough to destroy one home will probably destroy dozens of homes in the same area. If one company has written insurance policies on numerous homes in a particular city, then a devastating earthquake will quickly drain all the company's resources. Insurance companies devote much study and effort toward risk management to avoid such cases.

In the United States, insurance companies stop selling coverage for a few weeks after a sizeable earthquake has occurred. This is because damaging aftershocks can occur after the initial quake, and rarely, it may be foreshock. Although aftershocks are smaller in magnitude, they deviate from the original epicenter. If an aftershock is significantly closer to a populated area, it can cause much more damage than the initial quake. One such example is the 2011 Christchurch earthquake in New Zealand which killed 185 people following a much larger and more distant quake with no fatalities at all.

== California ==
After the 1994 Northridge earthquake, nearly all insurance companies completely stopped writing homeowners' insurance policies altogether in the state, because under California law (the "mandatory offer law"), companies offering homeowners' insurance must also offer earthquake insurance. Eventually the legislature created a "mini policy" that could be sold by any insurer to comply with the mandatory offer law: only earthquake loss due to structural damage need be covered, with a 15% deductible. Claims on personal property losses and "loss of use" are limited. The legislature also created a quasi-public (privately funded, publicly managed) agency called the CEA California Earthquake Authority. Membership in the CEA by insurers is voluntary and member companies satisfy the mandatory offer law by selling the CEA mini policy. Premiums are paid to the insurer, and then pooled in the CEA to cover claims from homeowners with a CEA policy from member insurers. The state of California specifically states that it does not back up CEA earthquake insurance, in the event that claims from a major earthquake were to drain all CEA funds, nor will it cover claims from non-CEA insurers if they were to become insolvent due to earthquake losses.

== Canada ==
There are 4,000 recorded earthquakes in Canada each year. Earthquake damage is not covered by a standard home insurance policy. In the next 50 years, there is a 30% chance of a significant earthquake in British Columbia.

== Japan ==
The government of Japan created the "Japanese Earthquake Reinsurance" scheme in 1966, and the scheme has been revised several times since. Homeowners may buy earthquake insurance from an insurance company as an optional rider to a fire insurance policy. Insurers enrolled in the JER scheme who have to pay earthquake claims to homeowners share the risk among themselves and also the government, through the JER. The government pays a much larger proportion of the claims if a single earthquake causes aggregate damage of over about 1 trillion yen (about US$8.75 billion). The maximum payout in a single year to all JER insurance claim filers is 5.5 trillion yen (about US$39.4 billion); if claims exceed this amount, then the claims are pro-rated among all claimants.

== New Zealand ==
New Zealand's Earthquake Commission (EQC) is a Government-owned Crown entity which provides primary natural disaster insurance to the owners of residential properties in New Zealand. In addition to its insurance role, EQC also undertakes research and provides training and information on disaster recovery.

EQC was established in 1945 as the Earthquake and War Damage Commission, as part of the New Zealand Government, and was originally intended to provide coverage for earthquakes as well as war damage. Coverage was eventually extended from solely earthquake and war damage to include other natural disasters such as natural landslips, volcanic eruptions, hydrothermal activity, and tsunamis, with coverage for war damage later being removed. For residential land, storm and flood damage is covered. Cover extends over fire damage caused by any of these natural disasters.

== Turkey ==
The National Disaster Insurance Institution (DASK) is a Turkish government agency which provides compulsory earthquake and natural disaster insurance to the owners of almost all buildings in Turkey. DASK is currently managed by Türk Reasürans, which is wholly owned by the Ministry of Treasury and Finance.

DASK was established in 1999 as the Turkish Compulsory Insurance Pool (TCIP) in the aftermath of 1999 İzmit earthquake, and was primarily intended to provide coverage for earthquakes. TCIP was managed by the Millî Reasürans, a subsidiary of İşbank, until 2005.

== Industry ==
Earthquake insurers use simulations to estimate the risk of an earthquake; companies which do that work include CoreLogic, which acquired earthquake modeler Eqecat in 2013 and AIR Worldwide, which is owned by the insurance analytics firm Verisk Analytics.

== See also ==
- Earthquake Commission
- Earthquake engineering
- Earthquake simulation
- Global Earthquake Model
- Seismic retrofit
