= Rachel Abercrombie =

Geologist

Rachel E. Abercrombie
- Education: University of Cambridge
- Scientific career
- Workplaces: Boston University
- Thesis: Earthquake rupture dynamics and neotectonics in the Aegean region (1991)
- Doctoral advisor: Ian Main, Paul Burton and Alan Douglas

Rachel Abercrombie is a seismologist at Boston University known for her research on the process of earthquake ruptures.

== Education and career ==
Abercrombie has a B.A. from Trinity Hall, Cambridge University (1987) and a Ph.D. from the University of Reading (1991). Following her Ph.D. she worked in California at the Southern California Earthquake Center and at the University of Southern California. After three years in New Zealand (1995–1998) at the Institute of Geological and Nuclear Sciences, she went to Harvard University from 1998 to 2001. She joined Boston University in 2001, and became a Research Associate Professor in 2006.

Abercrombie is on the board of directors at the Southern California Earthquake Center which started in 1991 as a National Science Foundation Science and Technology Center. She has also served on the board for the Seismological Society of America (2003–2005, and 2007–2009).

== Research ==
Abercrombie has worked on earthquakes along a wide geographic range including California, Nevada, Wyoming, the 1981 Gulf of Corinth earthquakes in Greece, and the 1994 Arthur's Pass earthquake in New Zealand. In marine systems, Abercrombie works on earthquakes on oceanic faults in the Atlantic Ocean, the Indian Ocean, and on the Java subduction zone. Using measurements of small earthquakes at the Cajon Pass drill hole, Abercrombie's research revealed attenuation of the signals used to characterize earthquakes in the upper portion of the Earth's crust and tracked small earthquakes along the San Andreas Fault. Abercrombie has also investigated foreshocks of earthquakes in the hopes of developing tools to predict when an earthquake will occur. Through her research, she notes the need for more efforts in documenting smaller earthquakes in order to adequately capture variability in the type and magnitude of earthquakes.

She was named a fellow of the American Geophysical Union in 2020 "For groundbreaking contributions to our understanding of earthquakes over a wide range of spatial and temporal scales".

=== Selected publications ===
- Abercrombie, Rachel E. (1995). "Earthquake source scaling relationships from −1 to 5 ML using seismograms recorded at 2.5-km depth". Journal of Geophysical Research: Solid Earth. 100 (B12): 24015–24036. Bibcode:1995JGR...10024015A. doi:10.1029/95JB02397. ISSN 2156-2202.
- Abercrombie, Rachel E.; Mori, Jim (1996). "Occurrence patterns of foreshocks to large earthquakes in the western United States". Nature. 381 (6580): 303–307. Bibcode:1996Natur.381..303A. doi:10.1038/381303a0. ISSN 1476-4687. S2CID 4329310.
- Abercrombie, Rachel E.; Ekström, Göran (2001). "Earthquake slip on oceanic transform faults". Nature. 410 (6824): 74–77. Bibcode:2001Natur.410...74A. doi:10.1038/35065064. ISSN 1476-4687. PMID 11242043. S2CID 4397063.
- Abercrombie, Rachel E.; Rice, James R. (2005). "Can observations of earthquake scaling constrain slip weakening?". Geophysical Journal International. 162 (2): 406–424. Bibcode:2005GeoJI.162..406A. doi:10.1111/j.1365-246x.2005.02579.x. ISSN 0956-540X.

== Awards and honors ==
- Fellow, American Geophysical Union (2020)
