= California Earthquake Authority =

Public safety agency

- Type: Private
- Industry: Earthquake insurance
- Founded: September 1996
- Headquarters: Sacramento, California
- Website: https://www.earthquakeauthority.com/

The California Earthquake Authority (CEA), established in September 1996 by the California Legislature following the Northridge Earthquake, is a privately financed, publicly managed entity based in Sacramento, California.

It specializes in providing earthquake insurance to homeowners, mobile-home owners, condo unit owners, and renters throughout California. Policies are offered through participating insurance companies, rather than directly from the CEA. The range of coverage provided by the CEA includes dwelling, personal property, and additional living expenses, along with unique options such as the Homeowners Choice policy.

In 2026, the CEA controlled 67% of California's market for residential earthquake insurance. Despite this significant market share, only 14% of all residential insurance policyholders in the state had earthquake coverage. This percentage includes various types of dwellings, with homeowners and condo owners at approximately 16%, renters at 14%, and mobile home owners at 20%.
