= 1979 Coyote Lake earthquake =

Magnitude 5.7 earthquake at Coyote Lake, California

- UTC time: 1979-08-06 17:05:24
- ISC event: 659922
- USGS-ANSS: ComCat
- Local date: August 6, 1979; 46 years ago
- Local time: 10:05:24
- Magnitude: 5.7 M_{w}
- Depth: 10 km (6.2 mi)
- Epicenter: 37.1°N 121.6°W
- Fault: Calaveras Fault
- Type: Strike-slip
- Areas affected: South Bay; Northern California; United States
- Total damage: $500,000
- Max. intensity: MMI VII (Very strong)
- Peak acceleration: 0.44 g
- Casualties: 16 injured

The 1979 Coyote Lake earthquake occurred at 10:05:24 local time on August 6 with a moment magnitude of 5.7 and a maximum Mercalli Intensity of VII (Very strong). The shock occurred on the Calaveras Fault near Coyote Lake in Santa Clara County, California, United States. It resulted in a number of injuries, including some that required hospitalization. Most of the $500,000 in damage that was caused was non-structural, but several businesses were closed for repairs. Data from numerous strong motion instruments was used to determine the type, depth, and extent of slip. A non-destructive aftershock sequence that lasted throughout the remainder of the month was of interest to seismologists, especially with regard to fault creep, and following the event local governments evaluated their response to the incident.

== Tectonic setting ==
The San Andreas Fault system (SAF) is a network of right-lateral strike-slip faults that form a portion of a complex and diffuse plate boundary. The faults span on and off shore along the California portion of the Pacific Rim, and in the area near San Francisco Bay, the extent of the various fault strands are limited to about 80 kilometers (50 mi) wide from east to west. This system of faults terminates in the north at the Mendocino triple junction where the north-northwest trending SAF meets the east trending Mendocino fracture zone. It terminates in the south in a more gradual fashion at the Salton Sea, where displacement transitions to a series of transform faults and spreading centers along the Gulf of California Rift Zone.

Several strands of the SAF in the eastern region of the San Francisco Bay Area are the Hayward–Rodgers Creek and Calaveras Faults. The Hayward Fault exhibits fault creep, but it also has potential for large earthquakes, like the 1868 Hayward earthquake that occurred on its southern segment. The northern Calaveras Fault meets the Hayward Fault near the Calaveras Reservoir and can also produce large earthquakes. Except for a large shock that occurred in 1911, the central and southern segments might only produce smaller events and fault creep.

== Earthquake ==
The earthquake occurred on the Calaveras Fault near Coyote Lake in Santa Clara County. Although the Hayward Fault Zone is also nearby, making this an area of regular seismic activity, no observable foreshocks occurred within the preceding three months. The mainshock was felt throughout the San Francisco Bay Area, but damage was mainly limited to the nearby towns of Gilroy and Hollister. A large number of strong motion stations recorded the event, including an array of units along the rupture zone, and instruments at the Berkeley Seismological Laboratory. The two closest stations at Coyote Creek and Gilroy, as well as the Berkeley stations, were used to refine the overall fault length, slip, and depth of faulting. The records revealed that strike-slip motion occurred over 8.7 mi (14 km) on a vertical fault, and that the total amount of slip varied with depth, with more slip occurring in the shallower regions.

=== Damage ===
In Gilroy and Hollister, sixteen people were injured, and damage totaled $500,000. Chimneys fell (especially on older homes in the downtown area of Gilroy) and glass was broken, but in Gilroy, structural damage afflicted five buildings. A wall was cracked at city hall, and a court room ceiling collapsed. Damaged structural components at a Ford's Department Store forced its closure. In Hollister, a J. C. Penney had a hole and cracks in its ceiling and a parapet collapsed at a law office. At Casa de Fruta, a service station sustained structural damage, as did a fire station at Pacheco Pass.

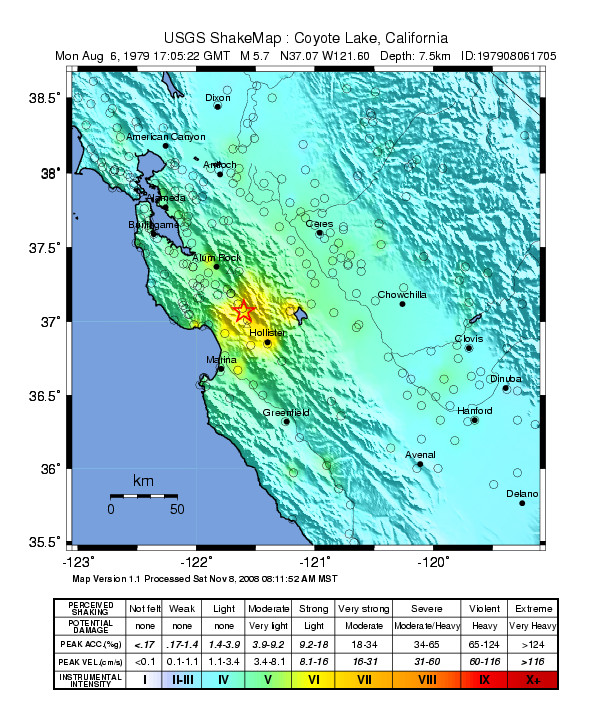
USGS ShakeMap for the event

An early estimate by the Small Business Administration put total damage in Gilroy at twice the amount of what was seen in Hollister. Ten people were brought to Hazel Hawkins Memorial Hospital in Hollister for treatment of lacerations, a cardiac problem, and anxiety. In Gilroy, the Wheeler Hospital saw six similar cases and a patient with a fractured hip. Most of those that sought care (including four that were transported by ambulance) were treated and released, but six were admitted.

=== Intensity ===
At the most extreme points of its perceptibility, it was felt with intensity II or III (Weak) at Healdsburg in the north and Santa Barbara in the south, Visalia in the central valley and Twain Harte in the Sierra Nevada foothills. It was also listed as having been felt (with no specific intensity level given) by residents in high-rise buildings in Reno, Nevada. Closer to the epicenter, several instances of damage were aligned with the highest observed intensity. The structural effects to the gas station's walls and roof at Casa de Fruta, the beam damage on the second floor of the Ford's department store in Gilroy, and the caved-in roof from the fallen parapet at the law office in Hollister were all considered by the United States Geological Survey to be consistent with intensity VII (Very strong) shaking.

=== Strong motion ===
The event was captured on seismographs at distances of up to 71 miles (114 km), including Richmond, with the unit 56 ft (17 m) "down hole" in bay mud. Other underground instruments on the Bay Area Rapid Transit (BART) Transbay Tube, as well as the Richmond site, showed accelerations that were very low. In San Juan Bautista, the U.S. Route 101/State Route 156 overpass saw peak acceleration of 0.12 g on the ground and 0.29 g on the structure. Instruments on the gymnasium roof diaphragm at the campus of West Valley College in Saratoga provided records of interest. Of a number of dams that had instruments installed, the San Luis Dam at San Luis Reservoir had the strongest response. The highest acceleration of 0.44 g was seen at the San Ysidro School in Gilroy.

=== Aftershocks ===
The United States Geological Survey operated a network of seismograph stations in the region where the shock occurred since 1969. A survey of the aftershock activity used data from these stations, along with a custom crustal velocity model, to narrow epicenter locations to within several tens of meters. The study indicated that the mainshock and the aftershocks were aligned with the strike and dip of the Calaveras Fault in that area and were classified into three distinct groups. The east-dipping northeastern group, a diffuse middle group, and a shallow and nearly vertical southwestern group showed variations of slip, especially in the 18 months after the mainshock, when fault creep was significantly higher in the northeastern and middle groups.

== Response ==
While none of the affected counties or cities declared a state of emergency following the event, the Small Business Administration approved a request by the Office of Emergency Services for a disaster declaration in late September. This formality paved the way for low interest loans for commercial or residential properties that suffered damage, but only about 50 claims were expected. Local authorities had trained for disasters on a regular basis, and the response to the light damage was considered smooth, though some officials sought room for improvement. Discussions followed the event, with local governments focusing on telecommunication problems, emergency power systems, and seismic safety.

== See also ==
- List of earthquakes in 1979
- List of earthquakes in California
- List of earthquakes in the United States
