= Karen Felzer =

American seismologist

Karen Rebecca Felzer is an American seismologist who works for the United States Geological Survey in their Pasadena, California field office. Her research has applied statistics to earthquake data, advancing the theory that earthquake foreshocks–mainshock pairs differ from mainshocks–aftershock pairs only in the relative strength of the first and second shocks, providing accurate estimates of aftershock probabilities, and differentiating aftershocks from unrelated background events. She also showed that the connection between mainshocks and aftershocks arises from the shaking of the mainshock, rather than from rearranged fault stresses.

== Education and career ==
Felzer majored in geophysics as an undergraduate at Stanford University, working there with Gregory Beroza. She continued her studies at Harvard University with Göran Ekström and James R. Rice. Her 2003 doctoral dissertation was A study of earthquake triggering through statistical analysis.

She took her position at the United States Geological Survey after postdoctoral research at the University of California, Los Angeles with Emily Brodsky.

== Recognition ==
Felzer was the 2009 recipient of the Charles F. Richter Early Career Award of the Seismological Society of America. She was a 2012 recipient of the Presidential Early Career Award for Scientists and Engineers.
