= Elastic-rebound theory =

Explanation of how energy is released during an earthquake

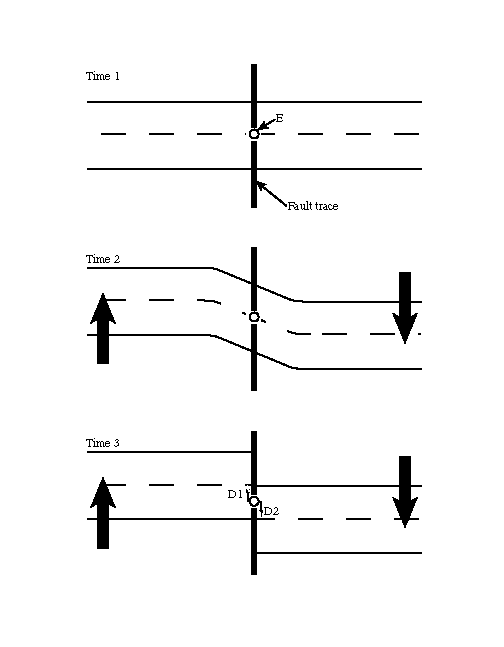
Elastic rebound

In geology, the elastic-rebound theory is an explanation for how energy is released during an earthquake.

As the Earth's crust deforms, the rocks which span the opposing sides of a fault are subjected to shear stress. Slowly they deform, until their internal rigidity is exceeded. Then they separate with a rupture along the fault; the sudden movement releases accumulated energy, and the rocks snap back almost to their original shape. The previously solid mass is divided between the two slowly moving plates, the energy released through the surroundings in a seismic wave.

== Theory ==
After the great 1906 San Francisco earthquake, geophysicist Harry Fielding Reid examined the displacement of the ground surface along the San Andreas Fault in the 50 years before the earthquake. He found evidence for 3.2 meters of bending during that period. He concluded that the quake must have been the result of the elastic rebound of the strain energy stored in the rocks on either side of the fault. Later measurements using the global positioning system largely support Reid's theory as the basis of seismic movement.

== Explanation ==
The two sides of an active but locked fault are slowly moving in different directions, where elastic strain energy builds up in any rock mass that adjoins them. Thus, if a road is built straight across the fault as in Time 1 of the figure panel, it is perpendicular to the fault trace at point E, where the fault is locked. The overall fault movement (large arrows) causes the rocks across the locked fault to accrue elastic deformation, as in Time 2. This deformation may build at the rate of a few centimeters per year. When the accumulated strain is great enough to overcome the strength of the rocks, the result is a sudden break, or a springing back to the original shape as much as possible, a jolt which is felt on the surface as an earthquake. This sudden movement results in the shift of the roadway's surface, as shown in Time 3. The stored energy is released partly as heat, partly in alteration of the rock, and partly as a seismic wave.
