= 1868 Hayward earthquake =

1868 earthquake in the San Francisco Bay Area, California, United States

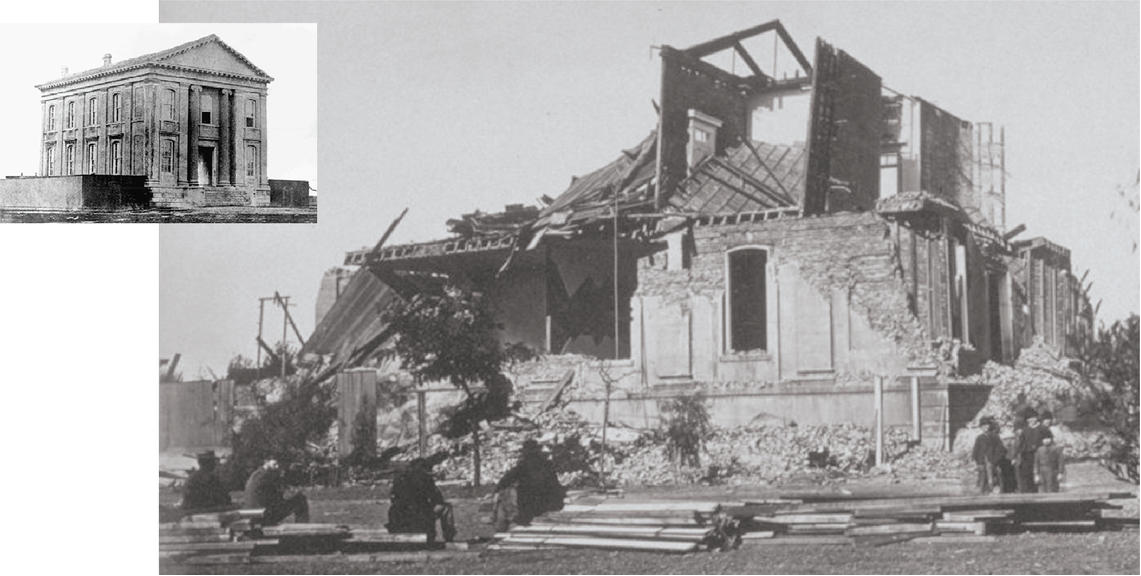
- Damage to the Alameda County courthouse with inset showing building before the earthquake

- UTC time: 1868-10-21 15:53
- USGS-ANSS: ComCat
- Local date: October 21, 1868
- Local time: 07:53
- Magnitude: 6.3–6.7 M_{w}
- Epicenter: 37.7°N 122.1°W
- Fault: Hayward Fault Zone
- Type: Strike-slip
- Areas affected: San Francisco Bay Area; California; United States
- Total damage: $350,000 / Moderate
- Max. intensity: MMI IX (Violent)
- Casualties: 30

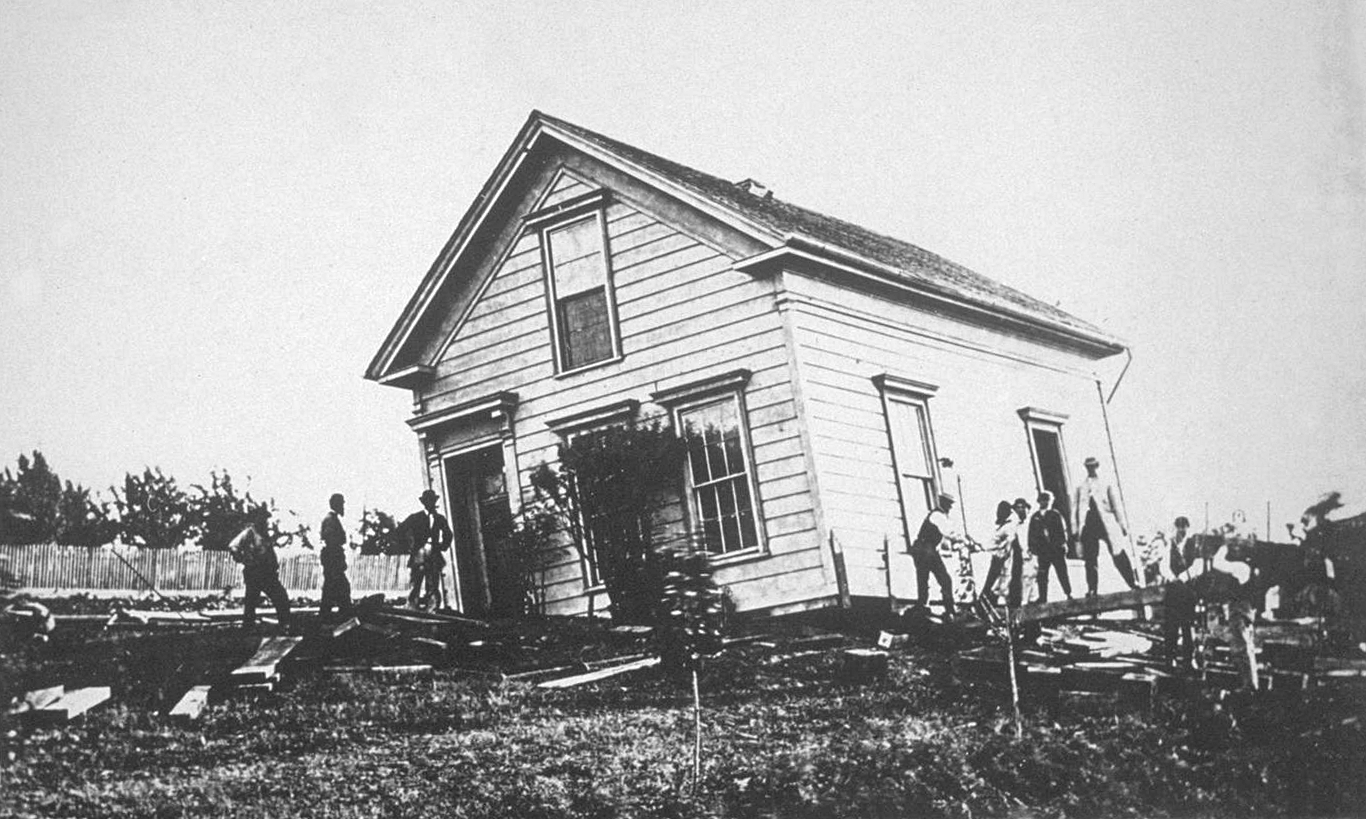
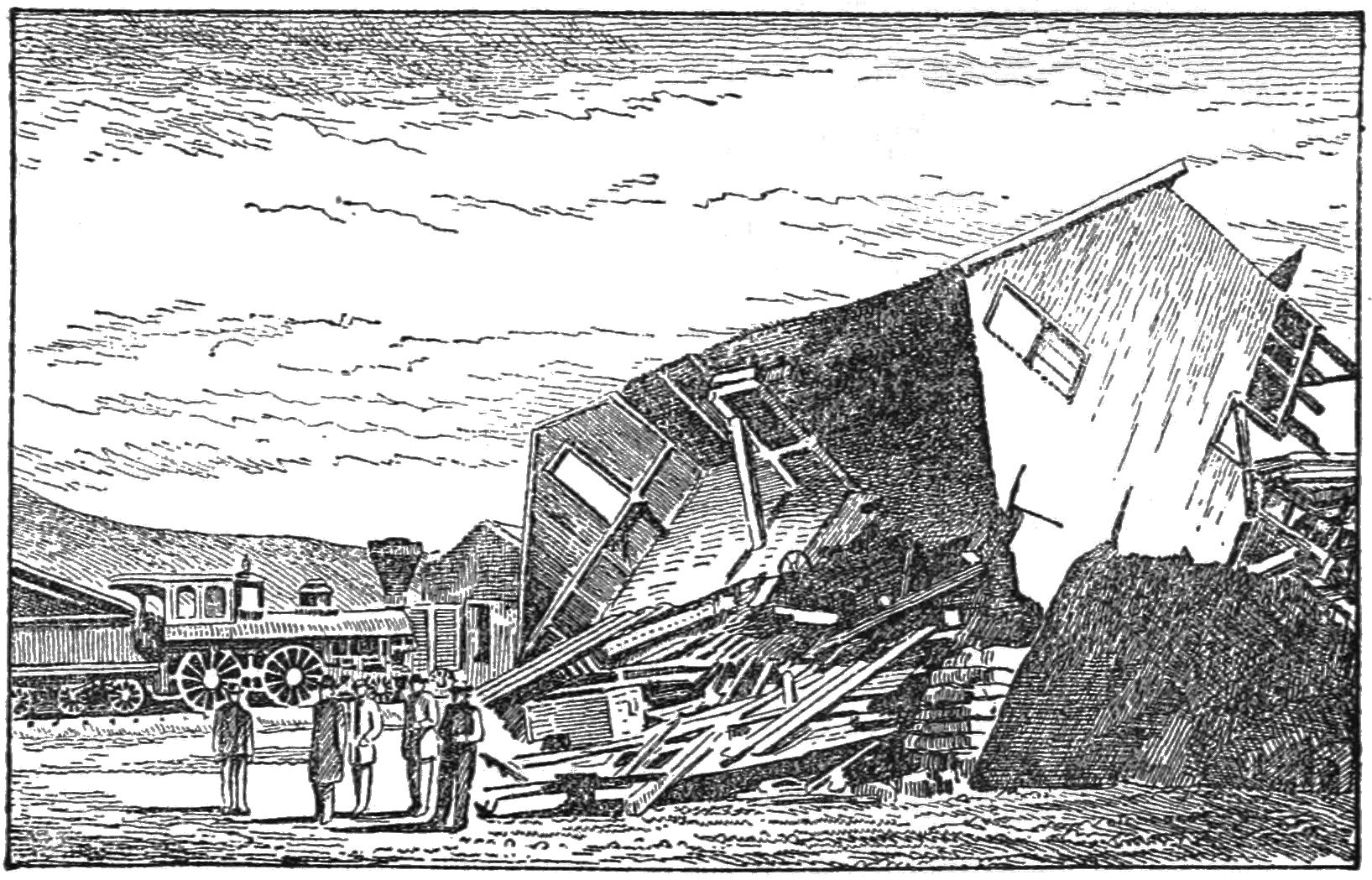
Damaged building in Hayward (top) and at the Hayward stud mill

The 1868 Hayward earthquake occurred in the San Francisco Bay Area, California, United States on October 21. With an estimated moment magnitude of 6.3–6.7 and a maximum Mercalli intensity of IX (Violent), it was the most recent large earthquake to occur on the Hayward Fault Zone. It caused significant damage and a number of deaths throughout the region, and was known as the Great San Francisco earthquake prior to being usurped by the more deadly and destructive 1906 San Francisco earthquake and fire.

== Earthquake ==
The earthquake occurred at 7:53 a.m. on October 21, 1868. Its epicenter was likely located near Hayward, California, and its magnitude has been estimated to have been 6.3–6.7 on the moment magnitude scale. At the surface, ground rupture was traced for 20 miles (32 km), from San Leandro to what is now the Warm Springs District in Fremont.

=== Damage ===
The town of Hayward experienced the most damage, with nearly every building destroyed or significantly damaged in the earthquake. The Alameda County Courthouse in San Leandro was destroyed, which resulted in the re-location of the County Seat to Oakland, its current site. The adobe chapel of Mission San José in what is now Fremont was also destroyed, as were several buildings in San Jose, San Francisco and throughout Alameda County. Damage was reported from Santa Rosa in the north to Gilroy and Santa Cruz in the south. Thirty deaths were attributed to the earthquake.

=== Intensity ===
The United States Geological Survey estimates that Hayward experienced shaking measuring IX (Violent) on the modified Mercalli scale. San Leandro experienced shaking measuring VIII (Severe), while San Francisco and Oakland experienced shaking measuring VII (Very strong).

== See also ==
- List of earthquakes in California
- List of earthquakes in the United States
- List of historical earthquakes
