= Laguna salada =

Laguna salada (Spanish: salty or saltpan; lake, lagoon, or depression) may refer to:

== Places ==
- Laguna Salada, Valverde, Dominican Republic; a municipality
- Laguna Salada (Mexico), Mexicali, Baja, Mexico; a dry lake in the Sonoran Desert of the Baja Peninsula
- Laguna Salada District, San Bruno, San Mateo, California, USA; a neighborhood in San Bruno, California
- Laguna Salada Fault, a geologic fault on the Mexico-USA border between Mexicali and Imperial counties
- Laguna Salada Marsh, Mori Point Park, Golden Gate National Recreation Area, Pacifica, San Mateo, California, USA; a marsh, see List of lakes in the San Francisco Bay Area
- Laguna Salada (Riohacha), Riohacha, Venezuela; a lagoon
- Laguna Salada, Sur Lipez, Bolivia; a lake in the Eduardo Avaroa Andean Fauna National Reserve
- Laguna Salada, Andulusia, Spain; a wetland, see List of Ramsar sites in Spain

== Events ==
- Battle of Laguna Salada (1820) Venezuelan War of Independence
- 1892 Laguna Salada earthquake, a magnitude 7.2 earthquake on the U.S.-Mexico border, in the Salton Trough

== Other uses ==
- Laguna Salada (song), a 1969 song by U.S. rock band James Gang
- Laguna Salada School District, San Mateo, California, USA; the school board of Pacifica, California

== See also ==
- Lagunas saladas de Pétrola y Salobrejo y complejo lagunar de Corral Rubio (ES4210004), Castilla–La Mancha, Spain; a Site of Community Importance; see List of Sites of Community Importance in Castilla–La Mancha
- The dictionary definition of laguna at Wiktionary
- The dictionary definition of salada at Wiktionary
- Laguna (disambiguation)
- Salada (disambiguation)
