= Chino Fault =

Fault in California, United States

Coordinates: 33°53′N 117°35′W

The Chino Fault extends along the eastern Chino Hills range region, from Corona in Riverside County to the Los Serranos, Chino Hills area of San Bernardino County in Southern California.

== Geology ==
The Chino Fault and Whittier Fault are the two upper branches of the Elsinore Fault Zone, which is part of the trilateral split of the San Andreas Fault system. The right-lateral strike-slip fault has a slip rate of 1.0 millimeter/year and is capable of producing anywhere from a M_{w} 6.0 to a M_{w} 7.0 earthquake.

== See also ==
- 2008 Chino Hills earthquake – Whittier Fault
- Puente Hills Fault
