= 2014 La Habra earthquake =

Earthquake in California, U.S.

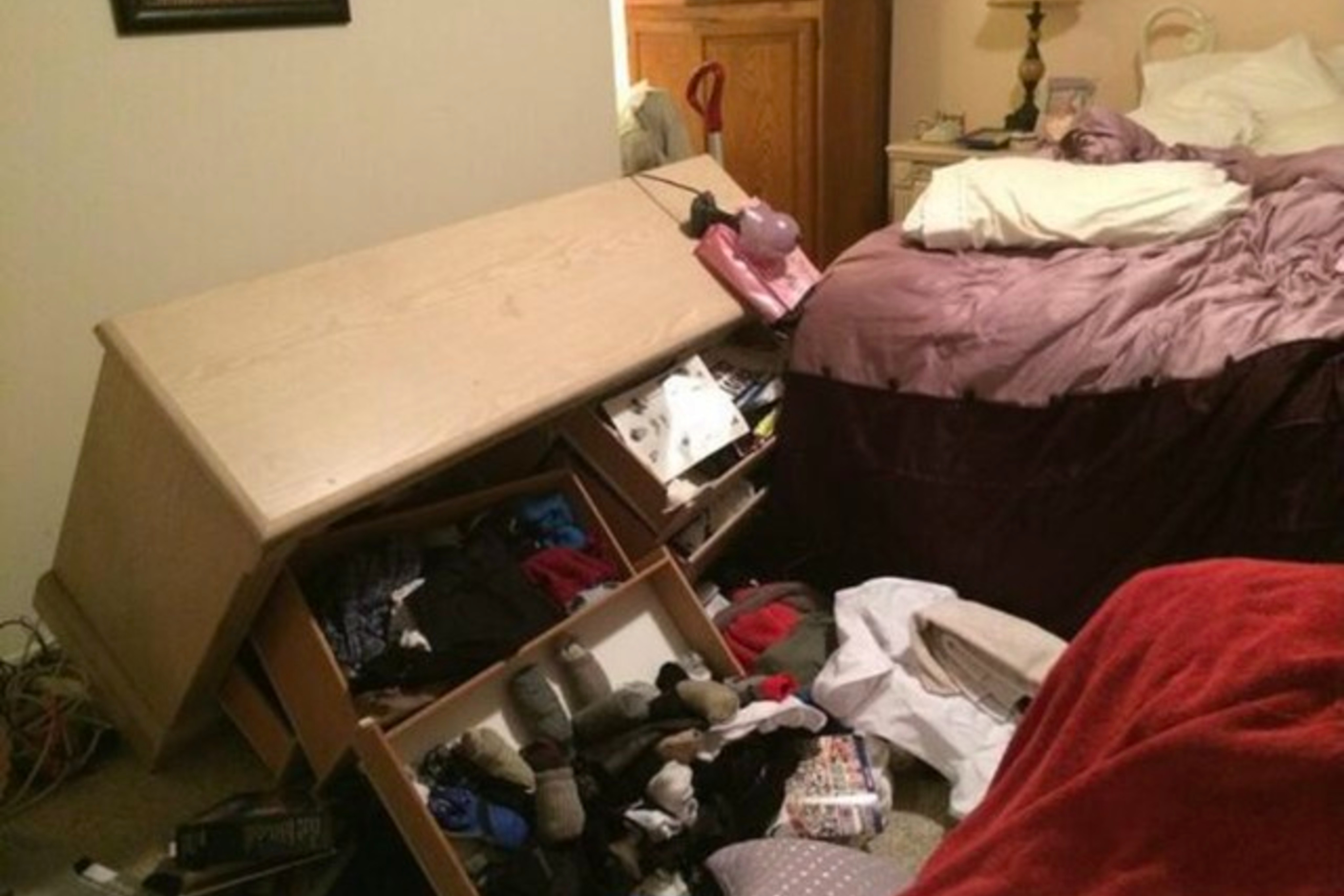
- Damage in Fullerton home

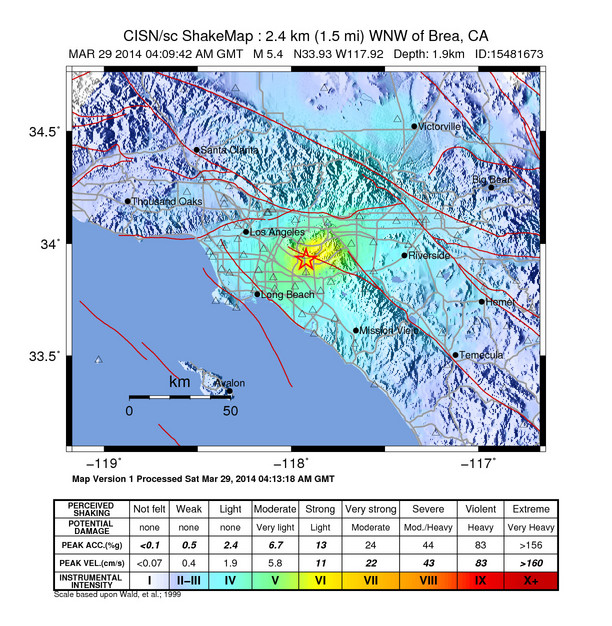
- ShakeMap created by the United States Geological Survey for the event

- 2014 La Habra earthquake (California)
- UTC time: 2014-03-29 04:09:42
- ISC event: 604372955
- USGS-ANSS: ComCat
- Local date: March 28, 2014
- Local time: 9:09:42 p.m. PDT
- Duration: 12 seconds
- Magnitude: 5.1 M_{w}
- Depth: 5.1 km (3.2 mi)
- Epicenter: 33.933°N 117.916°W
- Fault: Puente Hills Fault
- Type: Oblique Thrust
- Areas affected: Greater Los Angeles; Southern California
- Total damage: $10.8 million
- Max. intensity: MMI VII (Very strong)
- Peak acceleration: 0.7 g
- Landslides: Yes
- Foreshocks: 3.6 M_{w} 2.1 M_{w}
- Aftershocks: 100+ Largest: 4.1 M_{w}
- Casualties: None

The 2014 La Habra earthquake was a magnitude 5.1 earthquake that occurred on March 28, 2014, at 9:09:42 p.m. PDT. Although given the name "La Habra" it was centered in Brea, a city in northern Orange County. Despite its moderate magnitude, it had a maximum Mercalli intensity of VII (Very strong), and caused a total of $10.8 million in damage. Thirteen water mains broke in Fullerton, forcing roughly 70 families to be displaced from their homes after they were declared temporarily uninhabitable.

== Tectonic setting ==
The La Habra earthquake was caused by oblique thrust faulting on the Coyote Hills segment of the Puente Hills Thrust Fault System. The Puente Hills Fault is a blind thrust fault that runs north and west from Orange County to Los Angeles. It was the fault that was responsible for the 5.9 M_{w} 1987 Whittier Narrows earthquake on October 1, 1987. This area was previously shaken by the 5.4 M_{w} 2008 Chino Hills earthquake, which struck on the Yorba Linda Fault on July 29, 2008. The USGS moment tensor shows that Oblique faulting with a north-dipping plane roughly correlating to the Puente Hills thrust fault system.

== Earthquake ==
The earthquake was the most powerful earthquake in Southern California since the 2008 Chino Hills earthquake which had a moment magnitude of 5.4. Its epicenter was 1 mile (1.6 km) east of La Habra and its hypocenter was 3.2 miles (5.1 km) deep. Initial reports placed the magnitude at 5.3, however it was later downgraded to magnitude 5.1. Although the ShakeMap displays a vast area of highest Mercalli intensity of VI (Strong), the maximum observed Mercalli intensity was VII (Very strong), reported in La Habra, Brea, La Habra Heights, and Rowland Heights. In the area close to the epicenter, the greatest recorded Mercalli intensity for the DYFI map (Did You Feel It?) was VI (Strong). In Pasadena, the earthquake early warning system (ShakeAlert) provided a four-second warning before shaking arrived.

=== Impact ===
The earthquake caused no deaths. It was felt as far away as San Diego, Bakersfield, Las Vegas, San Luis Obispo, and Ensenada, Mexico. Some Southern California residents reported a temporary power outage. The earthquake sequence resulted in 13 water main breaks, a gas line break, and several pavement fissures. The majority of events occurred within a 6 km (3.7 mi) radius of the epicenter. A street in Brea was blocked after a rockslide forced a car to overturn, causing minor injuries. In La Habra, a Red Cross shelter was established for residents who were forced out of their homes or who opted to stay. Approximately 38 people remained the night, including numerous families. According to residents in Orange County, shaking lasted around 10 seconds. Disneyland temporarily stopped rides as a precaution and some visitors claimed they were stranded on rides.

=== Aftershocks ===
Over the next few days, there were over a hundred aftershocks, including a magnitude 4.1 earthquake just a few miles distant from the mainshock. There were two foreshocks with magnitudes of 3.6 and 2.1 that preceded the main earthquake. A relatively shallow aftershock sequence followed the primary shock, spreading upward from a depth of 7 km (4.4 mi) to approximately 3 km (1.9 mi) underneath the municipalities of La Habra, Fullerton, and Brea. One of the focal mechanism solutions, showing mainshock rupture of a northeast striking, northwest dipping left-lateral oblique thrust fault, is compatible with the northeast trend of aftershocks.

== See also ==
- List of earthquakes in 2014
- List of earthquakes in the United States
- List of earthquakes in California
- Puente Hills Fault
