= Elsinore Fault Zone =

Major geological fault in Southern California

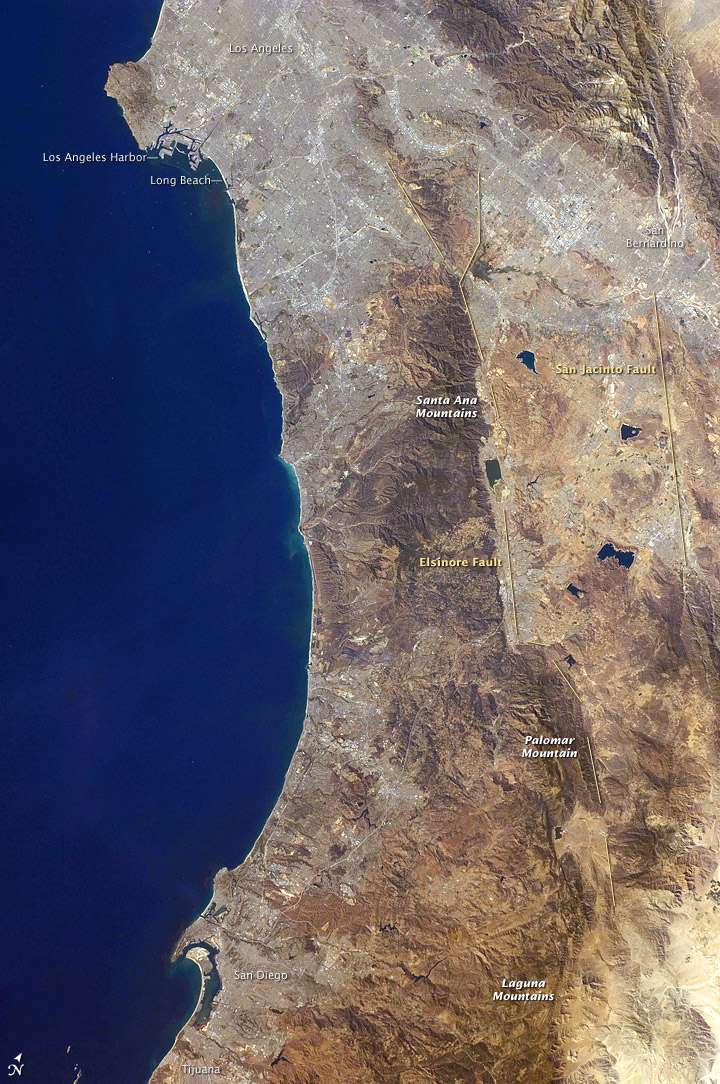
- California Coast, Los Angeles to San Diego Bay. The Elsinore Fault Zone is labeled in the center running along the Santa Ana Mountains. NASA photo, 2008
- Location: Southern California
- Country: United States of America
- State: California

Characteristics
- Part of: San Andreas Fault Zone
- Length: 140 mi (230 km)

Tectonics
- Status: Active
- Type: Transform fault
- Movement: Dextral

The Elsinore Fault Zone is a large, right-lateral (dextral) strike-slip geological fault structure in Southern California. The Elsinore fault comprises the westernmost part of the trilateral split of the San Andreas Fault system (which includes the San Jacinto Fault and the San Andreas itself). The fault runs in segments for 140 mi (230 km) between the Los Angeles Basin in the northwest and Ocotillo, California to the southeast before connecting with and continuing as the Laguna Salada Fault for 37 mi (60 km) in Mexico. It accommodates about 10% of the slip in the plate boundary between the North American Plate and the Pacific Plate.

In the north, the fault splits into both the Whittier Fault and the Chino Fault. To their southeast, the faults merge into one, becoming the Glen Ivy segment. Continuing to the southeast, there is a stepover at Lake Elsinore where the Temecula segment begins. It runs until Agua Tibia mountain and then splits into two main strands: the northerly Agua Tibia-Earthquake Valley segment and the Julian segment. The Julian segment then runs for a while before running through the Coyote Mountains as the Coyote Mountains fault segment. It then reaches the Mexican border where it joins up with the Laguna Salada Fault.

The Elsinore Fault Zone is one of the largest faults in Southern California. Despite slipping at a rate of 2–9 mm (0.08–0.35 in)/yr, the Elsinore Fault Zone is also one of the quietest faults in the region. It directly produced a magnitude 6.1 earthquake on the Glen Ivy segment in 1910. Additionally, it was associated with the M_{w} 7.3 1892 Laguna Salada and M_{w} 7.2 2010 Baja California earthquakes on the Laguna Salada Fault. It is capable of generating earthquakes up to magnitude 7.8.

== Tectonic background ==
California lies along the transform plate boundary between the North American plate with the Pacific plate. Multiple fault structures developed to accommodate the deformation, split into 3 main groups.

The westernmost group, the California Continental Borderland—which is itself split into the Outer Continental Borderland and Inner Continental Borderland—accommodates around 15% of the slip of the plate boundary on faults such as the Newport-Inglewood fault and Rose Canyon Fault.

The easternmost group of faults form the Eastern California Shear Zone (ECSZ) and take up up to 25% of the plate boundary's deformation. Seismic activity has been frequent along the fault system, with the ECSZ and its subsidiary faults being responsible for the 1872 Owens Valley earthquake, 1992 Landers earthquake, 1999 Hector Mine earthquake, and the 2019 Ridgecrest earthquakes.

The central and main group of faults are part of the San Andreas Fault Zone. They collectively accommodate the rest of the plate boundary's slip, and consist of large, mature fault systems. The primary fault, the San Andreas Fault, runs the length of California for 750 mi (1,200 km) and is capable of producing M_{w} 8 earthquakes. It has hosted famous earthquakes such as the 1857 Fort Tejon earthquake and the 1906 San Francisco earthquake. South of the San Gorgonio Pass, the San Andreas trifurcates: the easternmost branch remains the San Andreas Fault, the central segment becomes the San Jacinto Fault Zone, and the westernmost strand becomes the Elsinore Fault Zone. The San Jacinto Fault Zone runs for 130 mi (210 km) and can produce earthquakes up to M_{w} 7.5. It ruptured during the 1968 Borrego Mountain earthquake. The Elsinore Fault Zone runs west of the San Jacinto Fault and accommodates up to 10% of the plate boundary's total deformation. Despite this, it has remained by far the most quiescent of the 3 branches.

== Fault characteristics ==
The Elsinore Fault Zone is a right-lateral strike-slip fault that runs for 140 mi (230 km) through Southern California. In the north, it slips at a rate of 2–9 mm (0.08–0.35 in)/yr, with the slip rate in the south being 3 mm (0.12 in)/yr.

The Elsinore Fault runs along the mountainous Peninsular Ranges region between El Centro and San Diego. It begins in the north where both the Whittier Fault and the Chino Fault merge. The Elsinore Fault continues southeast, becoming the Glen Ivy segment. Continuing further to the southeast, there is a stepover at Lake Elsinore. This stepover delineates where the Glen Ivy segment ends and the Temecula segment starts. The Temecula segment then runs southeast for 34 mi (55 km), ending south of Agua Tibia Mountain. The Elsinore fault splits into two main strands around Agua Tibia Mountain: the northerly Agua Tibia-Earthquake Valley segment and the Julian segment. The Julian segment then runs for another 50 mi (80 km). The fault continues through the Coyote Mountains with the aptly named Coyote Mountains fault segment, before reaching the Mexican border where it is kinematically linked with the Laguna Salada Fault.

The Elsinore Fault has a relevant secondary fault structure component where the fault trace bifurcates and becomes double stranded, with the eastern strand called the Agua Tibia-Earthquake Valley Fault (ATEV). The fault starts near where the Julian segment begins and also runs southeasterly. The fault continues southeast before terminating at Sawtooth Ridge. Slip in the double stranded zone seems to be partitioned between the Elsinore Fault and ATEV, with both taking up significant portions of regional slip. The ATEV does also transfer slip from the Elsinore Fault Zone to the southern San Jacinto Fault Zone via a complex network of stepovers and uplift. The ATEV is considered to be the original trace of the Elsinore Fault Zone, with the current western faulting being a new fault that has since become the primary fault structure in the region.

The Elsinore Fault is capable of generating large earthquakes, up to magnitude 7.8. The projected interval between major rupture events is 250-750 years. Despite this, it has remained largely quiescent in modern times.

The Elsinore Fault Zone connects to faulting in Mexico southeast of where it terminates. The Coyote Mountains segment and the Laguna Salada Fault are separated by a releasing stepover. Slip data from an aftershock of the 2010 Baja California earthquake seismically links the Elsinore Fault Zone to the Laguna Salada Fault as one fault system. As the connection between the two is discontinuous and indicative of an immature fault system, it remains possible that a large earthquake rupture could simplify the geometry in the area and truly connect these two faults together.

== Earthquakes ==
The last major rupture events on the main Elsinore fault were a couple of M_{w} 6.0 earthquakes in May 1910 that struck in the Temescal Valley along the Glen Ivy segment. Since then, the Elsinore Fault has not been involved in any large earthquake rupture, instead remaining relatively inactive.

The Elsinore Fault Zone does have historical ruptures evident in fault trenches, however. Along the southern portion of the Temecula segment, for example, there are at least 5 surface ruptures preserved in the past 5 kyr (Note: kyr = thousand years). The most recent earthquake along this segment struck sometime between 1655 and 1810.

The Elsinore Fault Zone's Mexican continuation, the Laguna Salada Fault, has been quite active in historical times. The fault has hosted two M_{w} 7+ earthquakes: the 1892 Laguna Salada earthquake and the 2010 Baja California earthquake.

== See also ==
- Laguna Salada Fault
- San Andreas Fault
- San Jacinto Fault
