= 1892 Laguna Salada earthquake =

Earthquake centred near Mexico–United States border

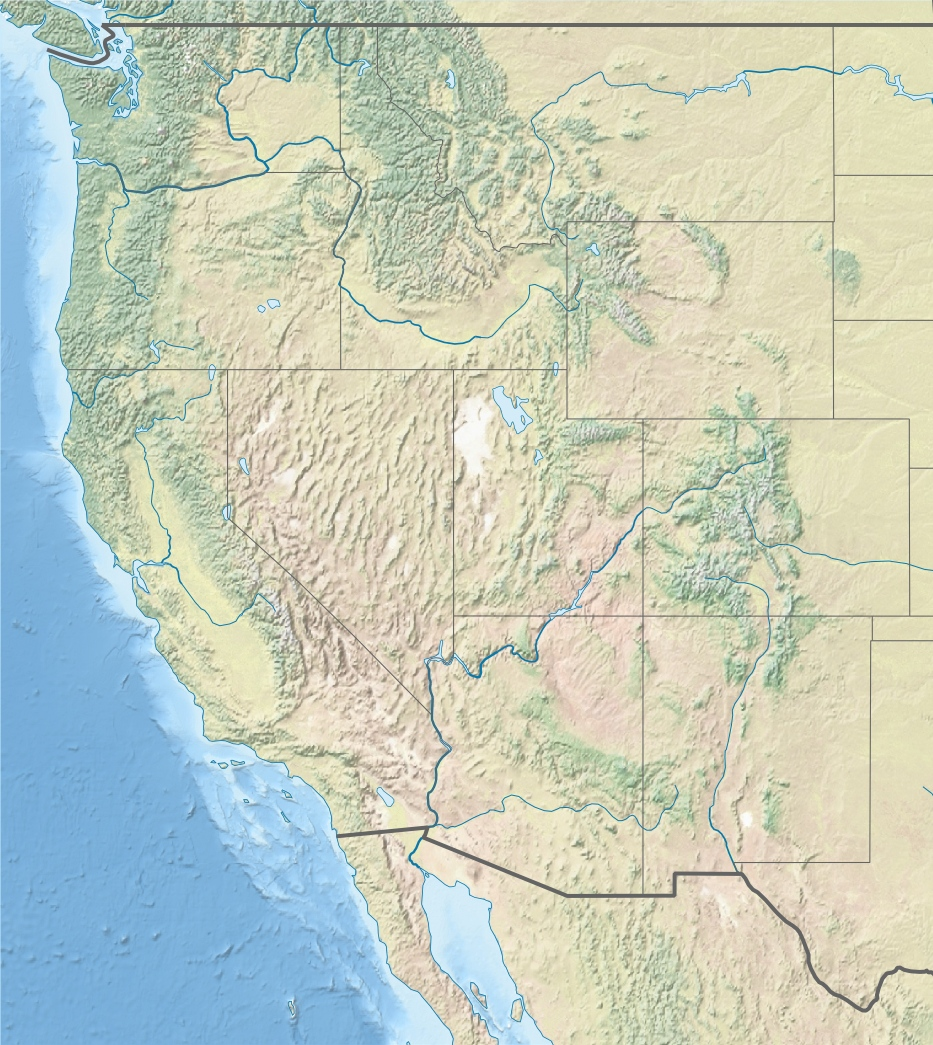
- UTC time: 1892-02-24 07:20
- USGS-ANSS: ComCat
- Local date: 23 February 1892
- Local time: 23:20 Pacific standard time
- Magnitude: 7.1–7.2 M_{la}
- Epicenter: 32.73°N 115.50°W
- Fault: Laguna Salada Fault
- Type: Oblique-slip
- Areas affected: Baja California; Southern California
- Max. intensity: MMI VIII (Severe)
- Casualties: None

The 1892 Laguna Salada earthquake occurred at 23:20 Pacific Standard Time on February 23. It had an estimated moment magnitude of 7.1–7.2 and a maximum perceived intensity of VIII (Severe). The shock was centered near the Mexico–United States border and takes its name from a large dry lake bed in Baja California, Mexico. There were no reported casualties, but the event affected the then largely-uninhabited areas of northern Mexico and Southern California.

== Tectonic setting ==
The Salton Trough is part of the complex plate boundary between the Pacific plate and the North American plate where it undergoes a transition from the continental transform of the San Andreas Fault system to the series of short spreading centers of the East Pacific Rise linked by oceanic transforms in the Gulf of California. The southern part of the trough is divided into two by the Sierra Cucapa and Sierra Mayor ranges forming the Mexicali Valley to the east and the Laguna Salada to the west. The western side of these ranges is formed by the Laguna Salada Fault, which forms a possible continuation of the Elsinore Fault Zone of southern California.

The Laguna Salada Fault shows combined normal (down to the southwest) and dextral (right-lateral) movement. Prior to 2010 it showed evidence of recent (probably historical) displacement with a 22 km (14 mi) zone of surface faulting, and 3–4 m (9.8–13.1 ft) of vertical displacement. This is interpreted to be associated with the 1892 earthquake.

== Earthquake ==
Selected Mercalli intensities
| MMI | Locations |
| MMI VIII (Severe) | Carizzo Station, Hook Ranch |
| MMI VII (Very strong) | Colorado Desert, El Cajon, CA |
| MMI VI (Strong) | Jamul, CA, National City, CA |
| MMI V (Moderate) | Julian, CA, Ensenada, Baja California |
Hough & Elliot 2004, pp. 1573, 1574

The earthquake was felt over a wide area from Los Angeles and San Bernardino in the north to San Quintin in the south. The area in which the perceived intensity of shaking reached VIII (Severe) or more was centered on the mapped fault rupture. At least 22 km (14 mi) of the Laguna Salada and Cañon Rojo faults ruptured during the earthquake. The section of the Laguna Salada Fault involved had an oblique-slip mechanism while the Cañon Rojo Fault corresponded to normal-faulting. Based on the extent of rupture and coseismic slip, at 4 m (13 ft) for right-lateral and 3.5 m (11 ft) for normal, the obtained moment magnitude was 7.1. The rupture may have been longer than thought; possibly propagating further north in a region dominated by sand dunes while the southern rupture end may have extended 10 km (6.2 mi). Susan Hough and Austin Elliot estimated a moment magnitude of 7.2 based on their reassessment of the reported Mercalli intensities.

=== Damage ===
A report from the Los Angeles Times the following day stated no damage was found in Los Angeles, but also specified that severe shocks were felt in San Diego. Masonry walls were cracked in several buildings there, as well as the outlying communities of Otay and Jamul. At the abandoned Carrizo Creek Stage Station, in what is now Anza-Borrego Desert State Park in eastern San Diego county, poorly built masonry was damaged and all adobe buildings were destroyed. At Hook Ranch and Laguna Station the shaking was strong enough to throw people off their feet and at Dulzura Canyon and McCain Valley the ground was seen to move in waves. There were rockfalls at Bratton Valley, Tierra Blanca Canyon, Storm Canyon and Whale Peak and landslides at Dulzura Canyon and Devil's Canyon.

=== Aftershocks ===
At Campo, California 155 aftershocks were felt in the first 12 hours after the mainshock and continued every few days for the next two months.

== Other events ==
The Laguna Salada fault moved again during the 2010 Baja California earthquake.

== See also ==
- List of earthquakes in California
- List of earthquakes in the United States
- List of historical earthquakes
