= 2008 Chino Hills earthquake =

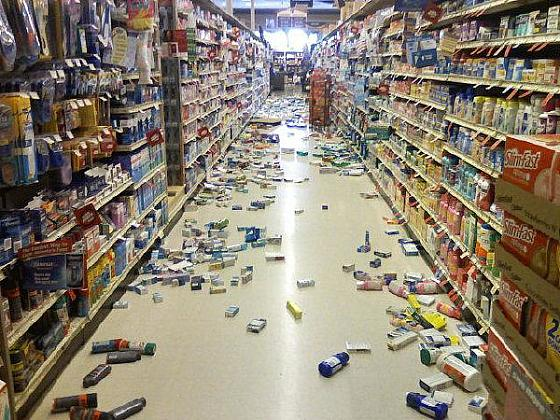
- The earthquake knocked down merchandise inside buildings such as this Yorba Linda grocery store.

- UTC time: 2008-07-29 18:42:15
- ISC event: 12951737
- USGS-ANSS: ComCat
- Local date: July 29, 2008
- Local time: 11:42:15 a.m. PDT
- Magnitude: 5.4 M_{w}
- Depth: 15.5 km (9.6 mi)
- Epicenter: 33.953°N 117.761°W
- Fault: Yorba Linda Fault
- Type: Oblique-slip
- Areas affected: Greater Los Angeles; Southern California; United States
- Total damage: Limited
- Max. intensity: MMI VI (Strong)
- Peak acceleration: 0.44 g
- Peak velocity: 38 cm/s
- Aftershocks: ~100
- Casualties: 8 injured

The 2008 Chino Hills earthquake occurred at 11:42:15 am PDT (18:42:15 UTC) on July 29 in Southern California, United States. The epicenter of the magnitude 5.4 earthquake was in Chino Hills, c. 28 miles (45 km) east-southeast of downtown Los Angeles. Movement on an oblique-slip fault resulted in a maximum Mercalli intensity of VI (Strong). Though there were no deaths, eight people were injured, and it caused considerable damage in numerous structures throughout the area and caused some amusement park facilities to shut down their rides. The earthquake led to increased discussion regarding the possibility of a stronger earthquake in the future.

== Earthquake ==
The Chino Hills earthquake was caused by oblique-slip faulting, with components of both thrust and sinistral strike-slip displacement. Preliminary reports cited the Whittier Fault as the active cause, but the quake was later determined to have been generated by the "Yorba Linda trend," as identified by Caltech seismologist Egill Hauksson. Its epicenter was within 3 miles (4.8 km) of Chino Hills and its hypocenter was c. 15.5 kilometers (9.6 mi) deep. Initial estimations of the moderate main shock reported it as magnitude 5.8, but this was later revised to magnitude 5.4. The main shock was reportedly felt as far south as San Diego, and Tijuana, Mexico, and as far east as Las Vegas, Nevada. It was the strongest earthquake to occur in the greater Los Angeles area since the 1994 Northridge earthquake.

As reported by The Orange County Register, three microearthquakes, all less than magnitude 3.0, occurred in Anaheim Hills, 7 miles (11 km) southwest of Chino Hills, two months before the Chino Hills earthquake. There was an unusually low amount of seismic activity in Southern California in the week prior to the quake. Between July 20 and 26, 2008, there were no earthquakes in Southern California exceeding magnitude 3.0, thus there was speculation that the wane in seismic activity was a precursor to a possible larger event.

=== Impact ===
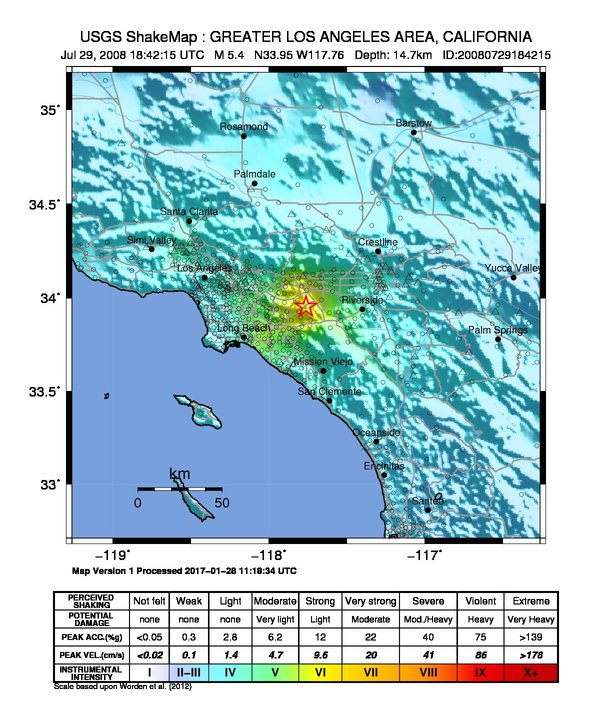
USGS shakemap for the earthquake

The Chino Hills earthquake caused no deaths or significant damage due to the physical location of its epicenter. Most of the infrastructure in the Chino Hills area is relatively new and well suited to withstand a large quake. Unlike previous earthquakes in the region—such as the 1994 Northridge earthquake and the 1987 Whittier Narrows earthquake, which caused serious structural damage and fatalities—this quake caused only minor damage. However, the high volume of telephone use following the shock overloaded provider capacity and disrupted service into the afternoon.

Amusement rides at Disneyland, Six Flags Magic Mountain, Universal Studios Hollywood and Knott's Berry Farm were evacuated and temporarily shut down. California State University, Fullerton suffered some damage in its older, inadequately engineered buildings. In Orange, the Chapman University School of Law was evacuated after a water pipe was ruptured. Pipes on a Macy's department store in Westfield Topanga ruptured during the tremor flooding the store which closed for a couple of days in order to be repaired. A light fixture damaged by the shock started a small fire in the Westfield MainPlace Mall in Santa Ana; since the fire was in an empty movie theater, nobody was harmed.

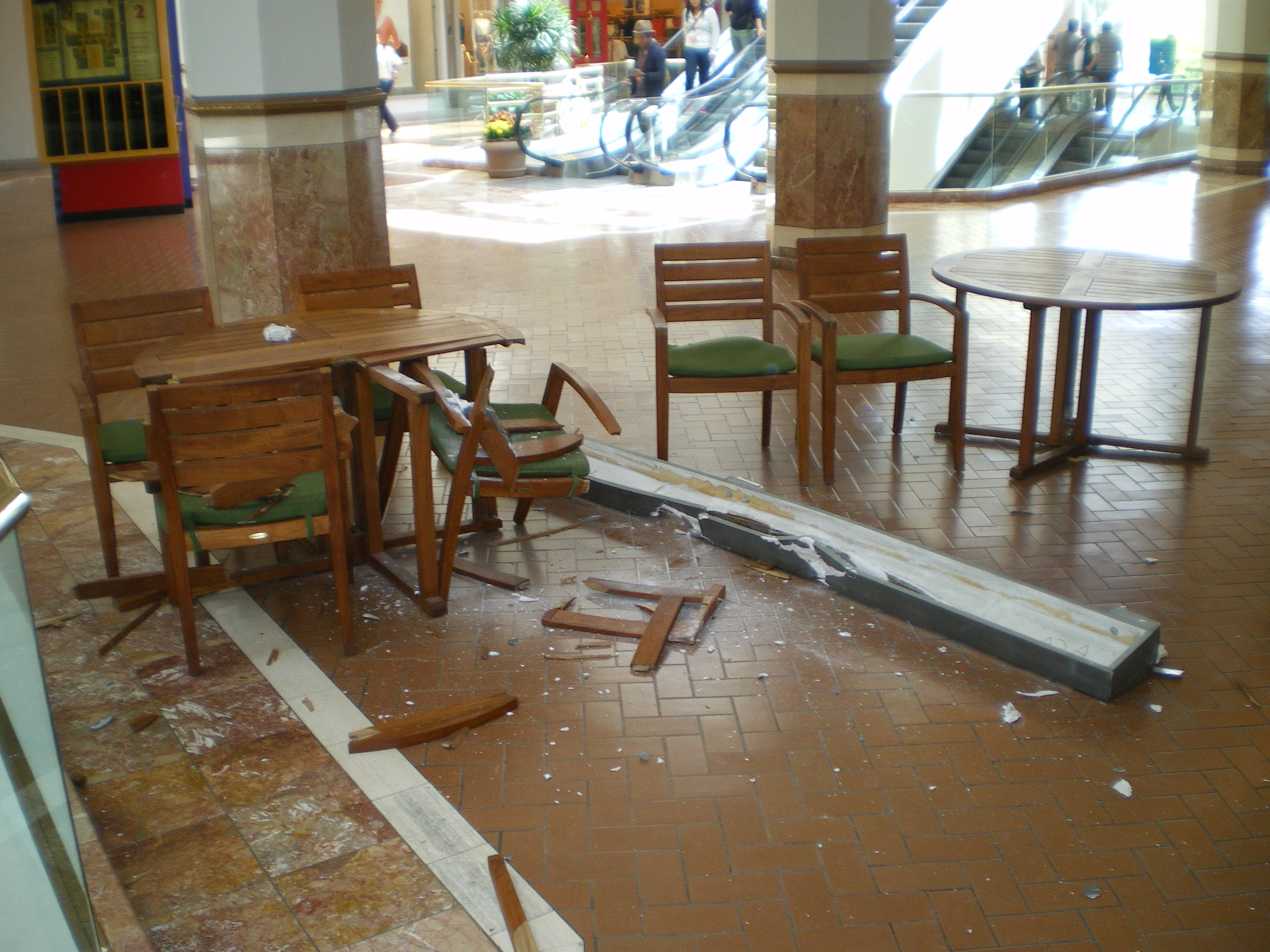
Earthquake damage at South Coast Plaza in Costa Mesa

A gap was reported on California State Route 91 near Anaheim Hills, c. 7 miles (11 km) southwest of the epicenter, but the California Department of Transportation concluded that the gap did not pose a danger. A minor landslide near the freeway caused some traffic congestion, but structural damage was reported. California Department of Transportation replaced an expansion joint on an Interstate 5 truck overpass at the El Toro Y Interchange. The roof of Placentia's public library nearly collapsed; afterwards, the building was closed for repairs.

Electrical outages were reported in Chino, Chino Hills, Diamond Bar and Pomona. Over 2,000 people lost power after a fire broke out at a La Habra power station, but electricity was restored that afternoon. Los Angeles International Airport reported a ground radar system outage along with a broken water heater, causing flooding in the checked luggage preparation area of Terminal 7. Minor injuries from falling ceiling tiles were reported at a medical clinic in Brea. The earthquake affected candidates who were in the first day of the three-day California Bar Exam in nearby Ontario and Los Angeles. The State Bar ultimately did not count that portion of the test for or against any attorney candidates.

=== Aftershocks ===
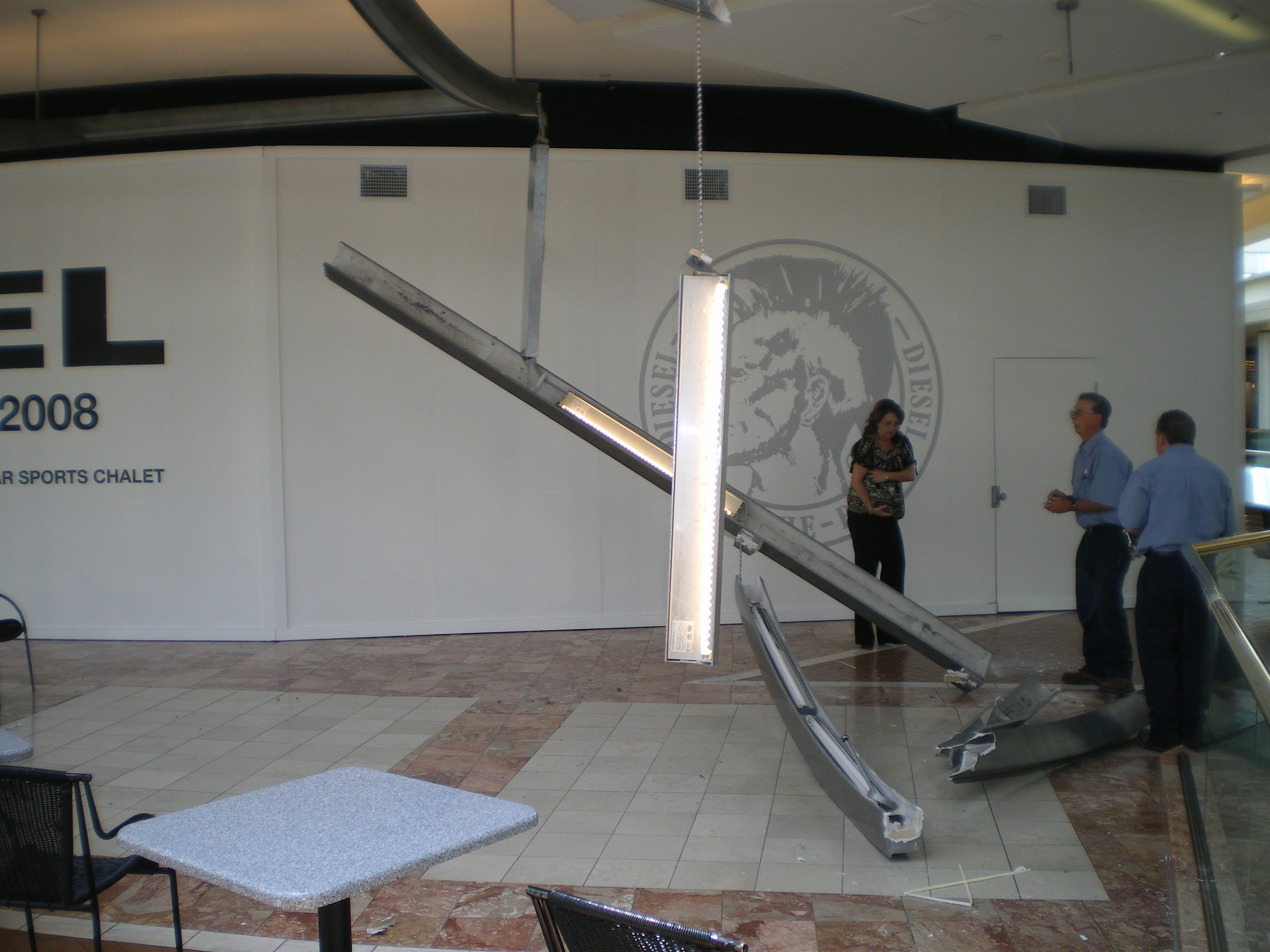
Damage in a shopping center

Approximately 100 minor aftershocks and one presumed foreshock were reported within two days after the earthquake, 27 of which occurred within an hour after the earthquake. Four aftershocks of at least magnitude 3.0 were reported—the first, nine minutes following the initial earthquake, was the largest at magnitude 3.8; and two others, occurring over two hours later, were recorded at magnitude 3.6. Twenty-eight aftershocks of at least 2.0 were reported.

=== Response ===
There was speculation that the Chino Hills earthquake may have been a foreshock to a larger earthquake. The Southern California Seismic Network's Aftershock Probability Report, produced minutes after the event, stated that "Most likely, the recent mainshock will be the largest in the sequence. However, there is a small chance, c. 5–10%, of an earthquake equal to or larger than this mainshock in the next 7 days."

Geologists at the United States Geological Survey and Uniform California Earthquake Rupture Forecast suggest that an earthquake with a magnitude of 6.7 or larger will almost definitely occur somewhere in the state within the next 30 years. then-California Governor Arnold Schwarzenegger said: "This earthquake reminds us to be prepared. [...] We were very fortunate that there were no serious injuries or property damage." Additionally, registration for the Great Southern California ShakeOut, a regional earthquake drill scheduled to occur on November 13, 2008, increased significantly in the aftermath of the earthquake.

== See also ==
- List of earthquakes in 2008
- List of earthquakes in California
- List of earthquakes in the United States
