= Foothills of the San Gabriel Valley =

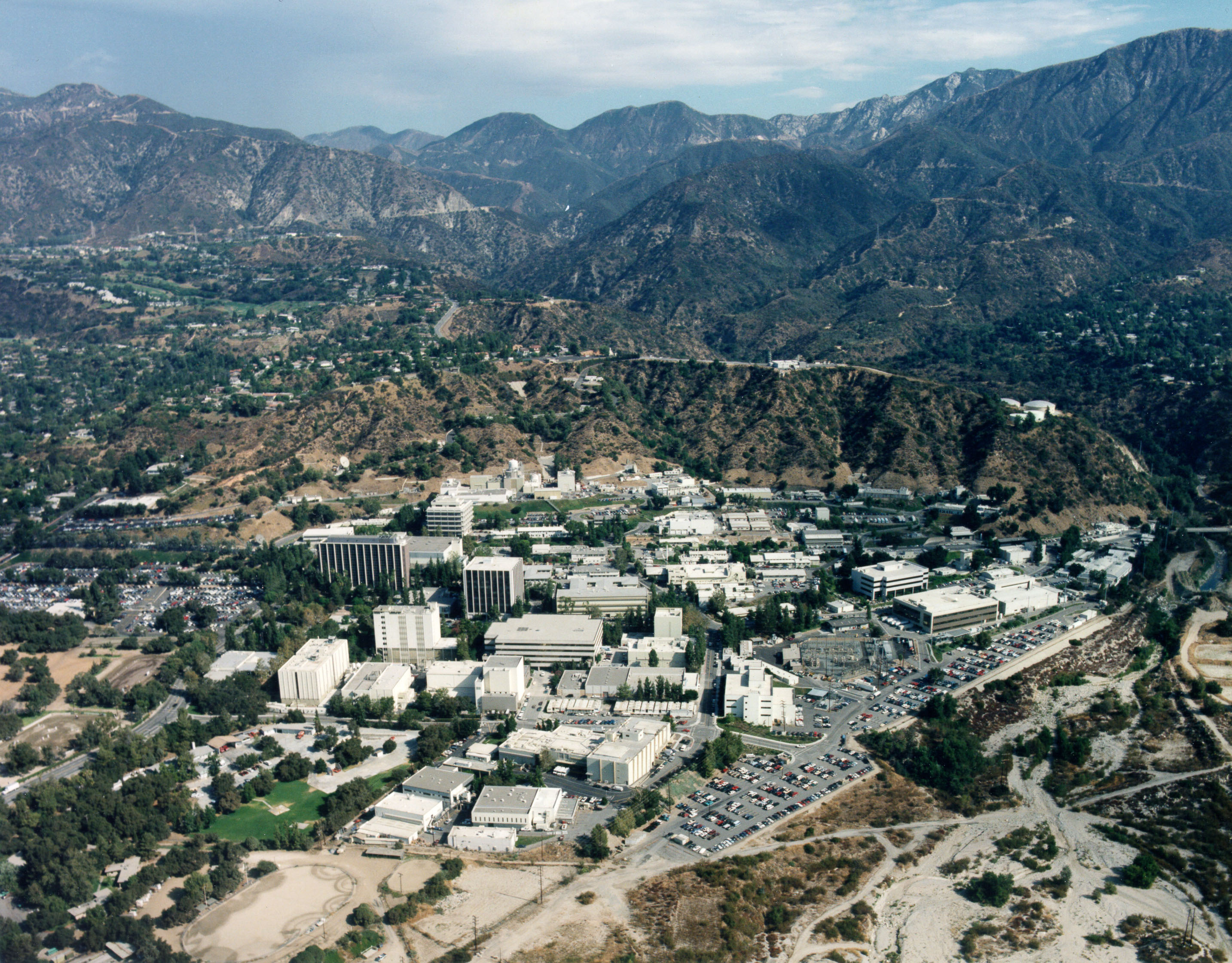
The Jet Propulsion Laboratory complex in La Cañada, in the foothills of the western San Gabriel Valley

The foothills of the San Gabriel Valley are the foothills and hills in the San Gabriel Valley of eastern Los Angeles County, California. They include the foothills of the San Gabriel Mountains, and independent low mountain ranges of hills, in the east Greater Los Angeles region. The landforms are part of the Transverse Ranges System of Southern California and Baja California.

== Geography ==
View overlooking the valley from the foothills of Claremont

The ranges are roughly parallel the San Andreas Fault to the north over the San Gabriel Mountains' ridgeline. They are generally along the Interstate 210 freeway, giving it the name "Foothill Freeway". The Interstate 210 and State Route 210 freeway covers 86 miles, between Sylmar in the west, through the foothills and San Gabriel and Pomona Valleys, to Redlands in the east. The Foothill Freeway superseded a highway known as Foothill Boulevard.

=== Foothills and hill ranges ===
The Foothills and Hills in the San Gabriel Valley region include

- Foothills of the San Gabriel Mountains – along southern face.
- Puente Hills
- San Jose Hills
- San Rafael Hills
- South Hills
- Verdugo Mountains

== Natural environments ==
The foothills provide greenbelts and contain Open Space Preserves and Regional parks. The undeveloped hill areas are part of California's chaparral and woodlands ecoregion – with montane chaparral and woodlands and Oak savannas habitats.

Their chaparral, grassland, and oak woodland plant communities evolved with wildfires, with some species of their native plants dependent on natural fires to regenerate and thrive. Chaparral is California’s most extensive native plant community. It is also one of the State’s most characteristic wilderness types, dominating foothills and mountain slopes. Properly defined, chaparral is a kind of shrub-dominated community of hard-leaved plants shaped by summer drought, mild, wet winters, and fires that naturally occur every 30 to 150 years plus – more frequent fires can lead to habitat loss and conversion to non-native grasslands. Montane forests are generally pine and fir dominated communities that occur at higher elevations in southern California’s mountain areas from 3000 up to 8500 ft. At the lower parts of the range, dominant trees include big-cone Douglas fir and Coulter pine as well as canyon live oak and California bay. On higher slopes, lodgepole, limber, ponderosa, Jeffrey, and sugar pines occur along with white fir, incense cedar, western juniper, and black and canyon oaks. The low elevation species are sensitive to fire, and thus only found on rocky areas where the geology itself is fire-resistant.

== Fire danger ==
The fire danger in the foothills is very high. Almost all of the cities that the hills go through are cities for which CAL FIRE has made recommendations on Very High Fire Hazard Severity Zones. There have been a number of wild fires in the foothills of the San Gabriel Valley, that is part of the area's natural environment. Global warming has occurred rapidly over the course of the past half-century. In California, less precipitation will occur as snow, meaning that less water is able to be stored in the snow-pack, and that dry summers could see even less water availability. Summertime peak temperatures will increase in many places. Fire "seasons" may become even longer. The declaration of fire season in California is actually a change in preparedness levels for the California Department of Forestry and Fire Protection. When weather patterns in an area of the state become warm and dry, and vegetation (fuels) are at a low moisture content point, Emergency response dispatch levels are typically increased, facilities are staffed 24 hours a day and additional firefighters are hired. When cooling weather, rain and snow are sufficient to reduce the fire threat, CAL FIRE then reduces its preparedness levels by releasing additional firefighters, closing some of the stations, and repositioning aircraft.

== See also ==
- Eaton Canyon Nature Center
- Foothill Transit
- Metro A Line
- Puente Hills Fault
- Interstate 210 and State Route 210 (California)
