= SCSN =

SCSN can refer to:

- Southern California Seismic Network
- Supreme Council for Sharia in Nigeria
