= Kate Hutton =

American seismologist

- Education: Pennsylvania State University (B.A., 1971), University of Maryland, College Park (M.S. 1973, Ph.D. 1976)
- Scientific career
- Fields: Seismology
- Workplaces: California Institute of Technology

Kate Hutton, nicknamed the Earthquake Lady, Dr. Kate, or Earthquake Kate, is a former staff seismologist at the California Institute of Technology in Pasadena, California, where she monitored Southern California's earthquake activity for 37 years.

== Background ==
While Hutton was growing up, her family lived in several states and spent six years in Taiwan. She was interested in all kinds of natural sciences, and she decided to stay in the fields of math and science. Hutton was an amateur astronomer in her teens.

Hutton received a B.S. in astronomy from Pennsylvania State University in 1971, and an M.S. (1973) and Ph.D. (1976) in astronomy from the University of Maryland, College Park.

== Scientific career ==
After graduating with her Ph.D., Hutton says she found astronomy jobs scarce, so switched careers. She sees astronomy and seismology as similar: "Earth is a planet, after all, so it's sort of a matter of looking down rather than looking up." In 1977, she began work at Caltech's seismology lab as a data analyst. She worked her way up to senior seismologist and was in charge of operating Caltech's earthquake measuring program and also conducted research.

Hutton's academic research areas in seismology included magnitude measurement, seismotectonics, and the development of the Southern California Seismic Network.

Hutton worked on a project to improve the consistency of the “earthquake catalog”, which is a list of over 400,000 southern California quakes recorded since 1932. She also worked on the development of earthquake safety programs, such as the statewide Earthquake Early Warning System, which could provide early notice of an earthquake and mitigate casualties and damage.

Hutton retired from Caltech on Jan 30, 2015.

== Public outreach ==
Starting in the 1980s and 1990s, Hutton regularly appeared in the media alone and sometimes with her United States Geological Survey colleague Dr. Lucy Jones to inform the public about recent earthquakes in Southern California and abroad. Hutton was “very successful and highly valued” at Caltech because of her ability to communicate complex topics clearly and accurately to the public. Hutton was also sought out by international news organizations from Japan, Korea, Sweden, and France for her explanations of earthquakes. According to LA Weekly, "Hutton strikes just the right balance between calm and caution" in explaining earthquake science to viewers.

== Personal life ==
Hutton is a licensed amateur radio (ham radio) operator and has been involved with the Palm Springs Hamfest. She is also the Section Traffic Manager for the Los Angeles Section of the American Radio Relay League, which calls itself "the national association for amateur radio."

Hutton has been an out lesbian since 1984, and is often listed as a "lesbian icon." She gave a tour of the Caltech seismology lab for the Los Angeles Gay and Lesbian Scientists group.

Hutton was the consulting seismologist for the 1990 monster movie Tremors starring Kevin Bacon. She also appeared in the 1981 Nostradamus documentary-movie The Man Who Saw Tomorrow.
