= Salada =

Salada can refer to:

== Places ==
- Laguna Salada, a municipality (municipio) of the Valverde province in the Dominican Republic
- Laguna Salada (Mexico)
- Saladas, Corrientes, a town in Corrientes Province, Argentina
- Saladas Department, a department of Corrientes Province in Argentina

== Other ==
- Salada Paulista, a bi-monthly magazine
- Salada tea, a manufacturer of tea
- Salada (biscuit), savoury cracker produced by Arnotts of Australia
