= Lucy Jones =

American seismologist

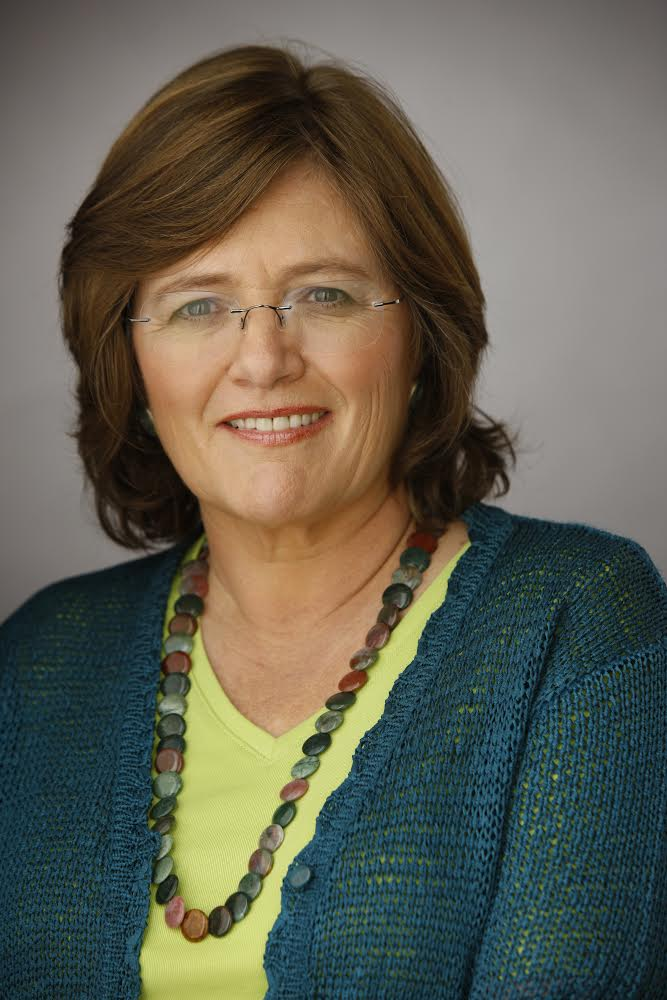
- Born: Lucile M. Jones; 1955 (age 70–71); Santa Monica, California
- Scientific career
- Fields: Seismology, Science communication
- Workplaces: US Geological Survey, Seismological Laboratory of Caltech

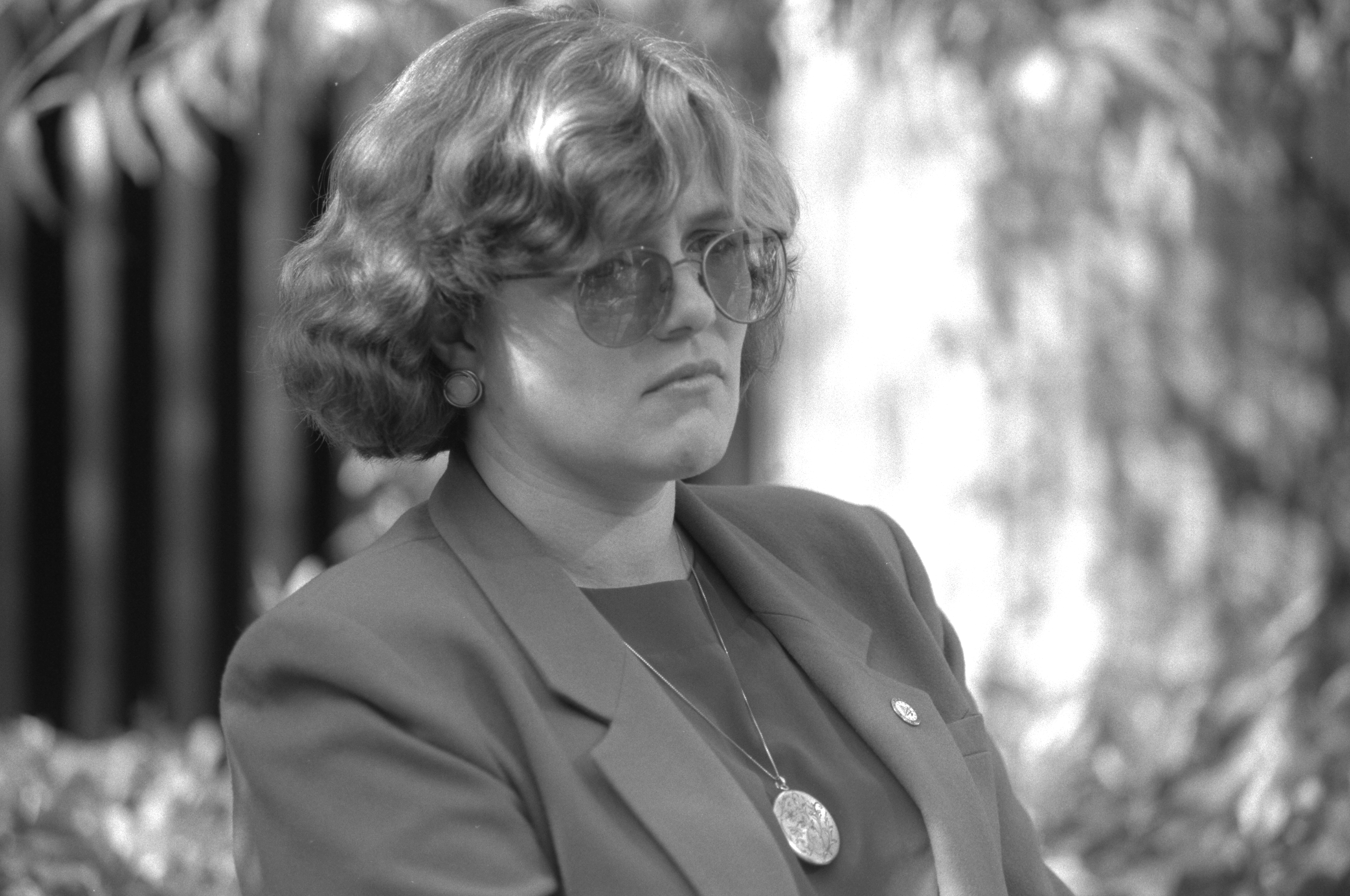
Dr Lucy Jones in 1994

Lucile M. Jones (born 1955) is an American seismologist and public voice for earthquake science and earthquake safety in California. One of the foremost and trusted public authorities on earthquakes, Jones is viewed by many in Southern California as "the Beyoncé of earthquakes" who is frequently called upon to provide information on recent earthquakes.

She is currently a research associate at the Seismological Laboratory at Caltech and chief scientist and founder of the Dr. Lucy Jones Center for Science and Society. She was previously at the US Geological Survey from 1985 to 2016, where she conducted research in the areas of foreshocks, seismotectonics, and the application of hazards science to improve societal resilience after natural disasters. At USGS, she was also part of the team of scientists that developed the Great Shakeout Earthquake Drills, during which millions around the world participate in annual earthquake safety drills.

== Scientific career ==
Jones has authored over 100 papers on research seismology with primary interest in the physics of earthquakes, foreshocks and earthquake hazard assessment, and the seismotectonics (earthquake-producing geologic structures) of southern California. Jones received a Bachelor of Arts degree in Chinese language and literature, magna cum laude, from Brown University in 1976 and a PhD in geophysics from the Massachusetts Institute of Technology in 1981. She visited China in February 1979 to study the 1975 Haicheng earthquake, which had apparently been successfully predicted by the Chinese authorities based on an analysis of its foreshock sequence. In doing so, she became one of the first United States scientists to enter China following the normalization of relations between the two countries. She is a past Secretary of the Seismology Section of the American Geophysical Union, and past director and past chair of the publications committee of the Seismological Society of America.

Jones served as the Science Advisor for Risk Reduction for the USGS Natural Hazards Mission Area, as part of the SAFRR Project. She also worked as a Commissioner of the California Seismic Safety Commission (CSSC), which advises the governor and legislature on seismic safety, by appointment of Governor Gray Davis in 2002 and reappointment by Governor Arnold Schwarzenegger in 2005 and served on the California Earthquake Prediction Evaluation Council. In January 2014, she entered into a partnership on behalf of the USGS with the City of Los Angeles to serve as Seismic Risk Advisor to Mayor Eric Garcetti.

After retiring from the USGS in 2016, Jones founded the Dr. Lucy Jones Center for Science and Society and wrote a book published in 2018 titled The Big Ones: How Natural Disasters Have Shaped Us (and What We Can Do About Them). In the book, Jones chronicles some of the world's greatest natural disasters, such as volcanic eruptions, earthquakes, floods, and hurricanes, and analyzes how people have responded to them to understand how future crises can be survived.

From 2019 to 2020, Jones served as the Wayne Morse Chair of Law and Politics, established in honor of the late former Senator, at the University of Oregon. She provided public talks on disaster preparedness and science communication.

== Public outreach ==
Since 1986, Jones has given many interviews to the press on behalf of the US Geological Survey following significant earthquakes in southern California. In many media appearances, she worked together with fellow Caltech seismologist, Kate Hutton. In a 2004 profile of Jones, Tom Jordan of the Southern California Earthquake Center at USC was quoted as saying, "Lucy provides Southern California – and the nation – with a very calming voice and an authoritative voice to the public's inquiry in disaster." He also said that her high public profile may make her "one of the most effective chairs of CSSC ever".

Public perception of Jones as a voice of calm and reassurance has been attributed, in part, to an incident following the 1992 Joshua Tree earthquake in which she answered press questions while holding her sleeping child in her arms. In a 2011 interview, Jones denied the story that she asked the press to be quiet so as not to wake her son. She also expressed some regret that she became a symbol that "women can have it all".

In 2014, Jones was embedded at Los Angeles City Hall, a move by the USGS that Caltech's Tom Heaton credited with the September 2015 passage of a retrofitting plan that would increase seismic survivability of over 15,000 structures largely built of soft first story and non-ductile concrete.

=== COVID-19 ===
In light of her reputation as a respected and trusted authority on earthquakes, Jones has been called upon for her comments regarding other natural disasters and crises, such as the COVID-19 pandemic. According to Jones, in a crisis, the public is best served when they are given "one clear message" to minimize the possibility of overwhelming or confusing people. And for the COVID-19 pandemic, that message, says Jones, is "[d]on't share your air" by wearing a mask and maintaining physical distance.

=== Climate change ===
In 2022, Jones founded an initiative called "Tempo: Music for Climate Action" to encourage climate scientists, social scientists, and musicians to gather and explore climate issues.

== Selected awards ==
Jones has received the Alquist Award from the California Earthquake Safety Foundation, the Shoemaker Award for Lifetime Achievements in Science Communication from the USGS, the Samuel J. Heyman Service to America Medal from the Partnership for Public Service in 2015, and the Seismological Society of America's Frank Press Public Service Award in 2018. In 2024, Jones was one of USA Today's Women of the Year.

== Personal life ==
Jones's uncle was an American diplomat living in Taiwan, and she moved to Taiwan to live with her uncle's family. In 1971, she graduated as the salutatorian from the Taipei American School before entering Brown University. Her Chinese name is 章光月.

Jones, a fourth-generation resident of southern California, currently lives in Pasadena, California. She is married to fellow seismologist Egill Hauksson and they have two sons.

Jones is a musician and composer, who plays a Renaissance stringed instrument called the viol. She is a member of Los Angeles Baroque, which calls itself "LA's Community Baroque Orchestra." In 2019, Jones released a music video accompanying a piece she composed called In Nomine Terra Calens, which translates to "In the Name of a Warming Earth". In Nomine Terra Calens is her musical interpretation of global temperature data from 1880 to 2017, which shows an increase at what Jones calls a "terrifying" rate. In February 2019, Los Angeles Baroque performed In Nomine Terra Calens at the Natural History Museum of Los Angeles County.
