= 2010 Baja California earthquake =

Earthquake in Mexico

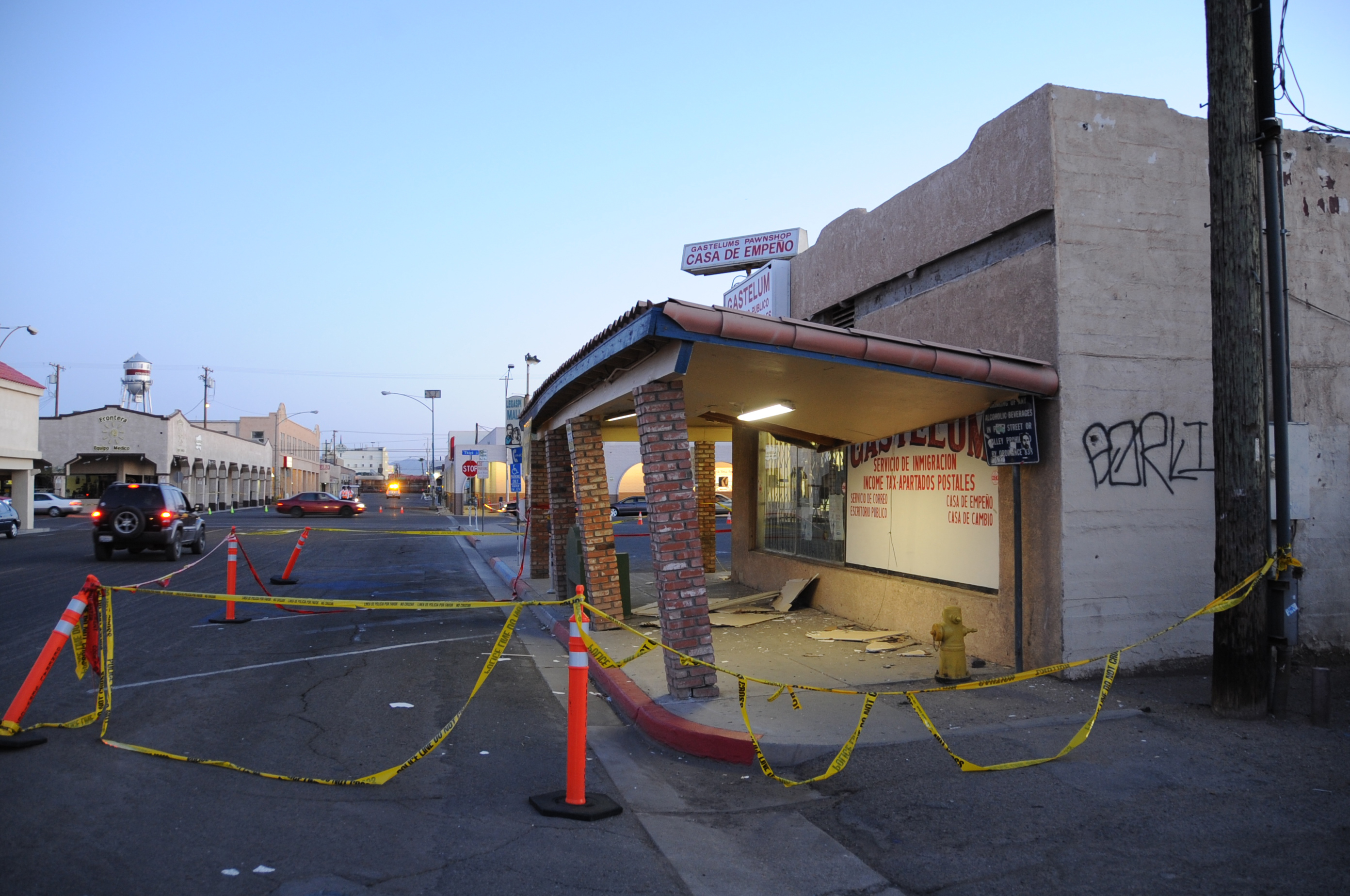
- Building damaged in Calexico, California

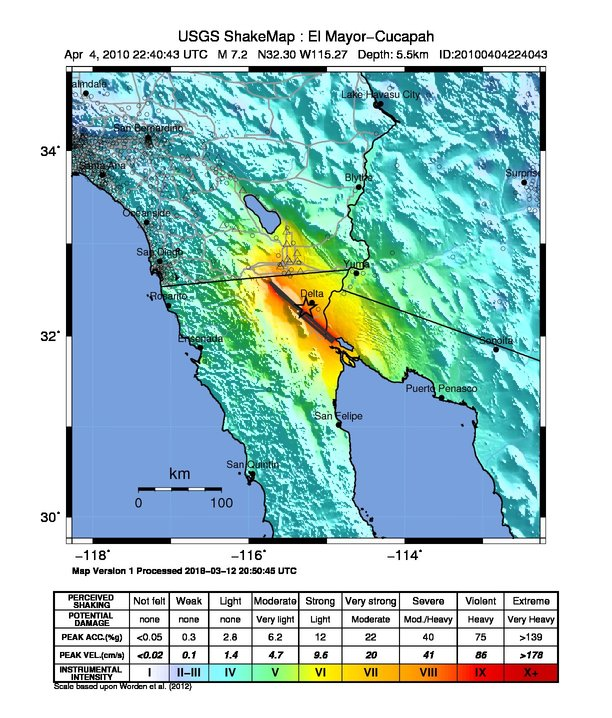
- USGS shake map for the mainshock

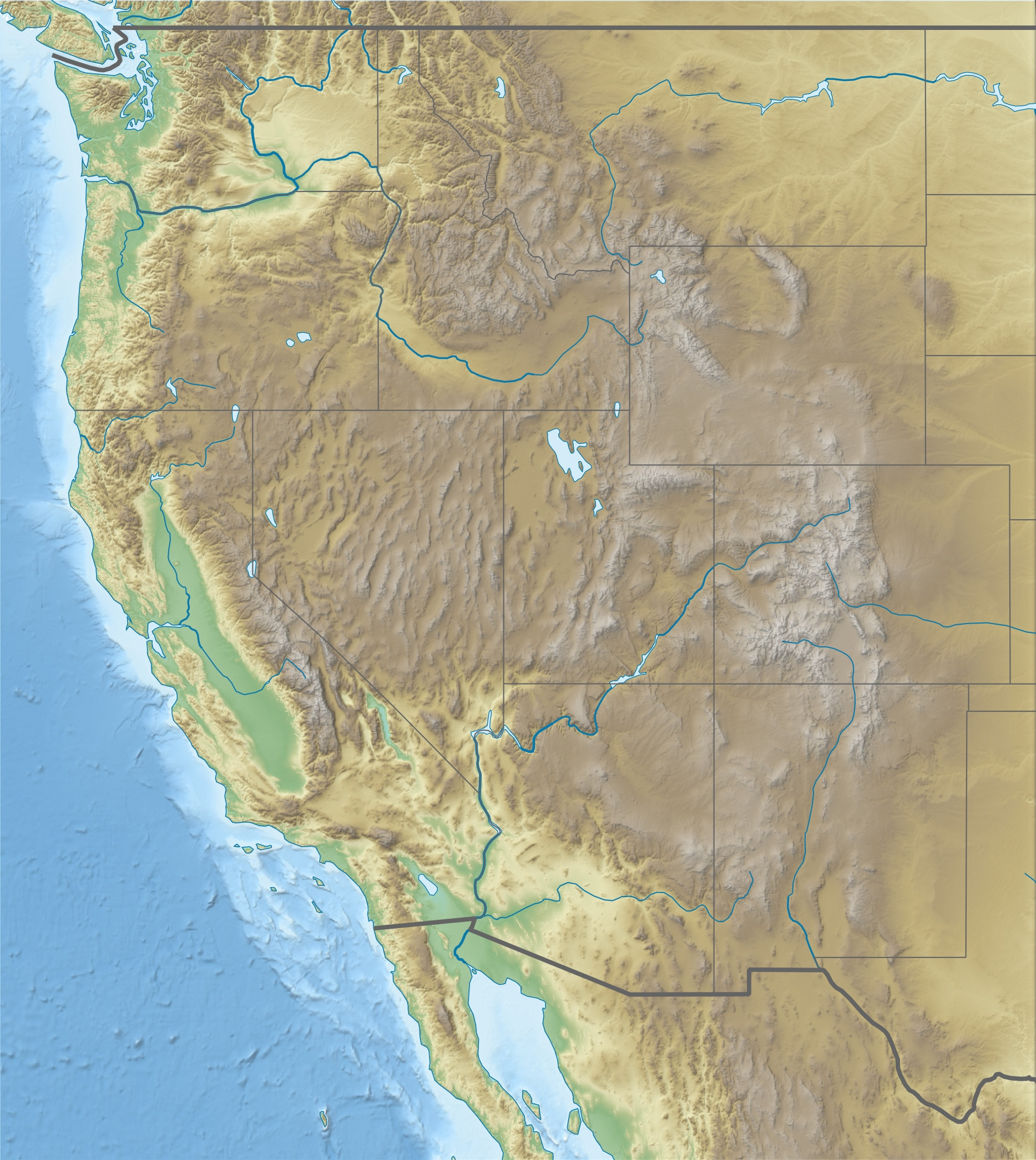
- Location within USA West
- UTC time: 2010-04-04 22:40:42
- ISC event: 600257057
- USGS-ANSS: ComCat
- Local date: April 4, 2010
- Local time: 15:40:41
- Duration: 89 seconds
- Magnitude: 7.2 M_{w}
- Depth: 10 km (6.2 mi)
- Epicenter: 32.13°N 115.30°W
- Type: Oblique-slip
- Areas affected: Mexico; United States
- Total damage: $1.15 billion (2010 USD)
- Max. intensity: MMI IX (Violent)
- Peak acceleration: 0.58 g
- Peak velocity: 61 cm/s
- Tsunami: No
- Landslides: Yes
- Aftershocks: Yes
- Casualties: 2–4 dead 100–233 injured

The 2010 Baja California earthquake (also known as 2010 Easter earthquake, 2010 Sierra El Mayor earthquake, or 2010 El Mayor–Cucapah earthquake) occurred on April 4 (Easter Sunday) with a moment magnitude of 7.2 and a maximum Mercalli intensity of IX (Violent). The shock originated at 15:40:41 local time (3:40:41 PM PDT) south of Guadalupe Victoria, Baja California, Mexico.

The 89-second quake was widely felt throughout northwest Mexico and southern California. It was also the strongest to rock southern California in at least 18 years (since the M 7.3 1992 Landers earthquake), if not longer: the next most recent comparable earthquake—the 1952 Kern County earthquake (M 7.3)—was 58 years earlier. Each of these earthquakes had a similar magnitude, and was also felt across a large swath of North America. Most of the damage occurred in the twin cities of Mexicali and Calexico on the Mexico–United States border.

== Geology ==
The quake originally was believed to have occurred on the Laguna Salada Fault, which is about 60–80 kilometers (37–50 mi) long and straddles the California–Baja California border. The active Laguna Salada Fault ruptured in February 1892 with an estimated M_{w} 7.2 earthquake.

By the distribution of aftershocks and using radar interferometry, the main shock rupture was found to have occurred on a previously unmapped fault in the Cucapah Mountains and beneath the Colorado River Delta. This fault line was named the Indiviso Fault, after the nearby town of El Indiviso. A liquefaction zone bounded by the Cerro Prieto Fault and the Laguna Salada Fault was observed.

== Timeline ==
=== Foreshocks ===
Mexicali, El Centro, San Diego, Ensenada, and Tijuana are situated in a very active seismic zone and surrounded by important faults. An earthquake of such magnitude had been expected around the fault situated in the southeast of Mexicali. Before the M_{w} 7.2 earthquake occurred, the surrounding area had been seismically active in 2009. Several foreshocks began from April 1, 2010, with magnitudes of 3 and 4.

=== Mainshock ===
The earthquake measured 7.2 on the moment magnitude scale that started 25 kilometers (16 mi) south of Guadalupe Victoria, Baja California, at a depth of 10 km (6.2 mi). It occurred at 22:40 UTC (15:40 local time) on Easter Sunday, April 4, 2010, and it is said to have lasted about a minute and 29 seconds. Since the earthquake occurred on this day, it has been also called the Easter Sunday earthquake. A maximum Modified Mercalli intensity of IX (Violent) was assigned to areas along the fault rupture length while the nearest heavily populated city, Mexicali, was assigned intensity VIII (Severe). Intensity VII (Very strong) shaking was felt in Calexico, Imperial, El Centro, and Heber. Intensity VI (Strong) shaking was felt in the Imperial Valley towns of Ocotillo, Calipatria, Brawley, and Holtville.

The April 4 quake was the second largest earthquake in Baja California history after the 1892 Laguna Salada earthquake at a magnitude of 7.2–7.8 on the Richter magnitude scale, and was well recorded in Southern California, especially in the Imperial valley.

=== Aftershocks ===
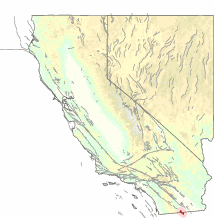
Laguna Salada Fault (outlined in red).

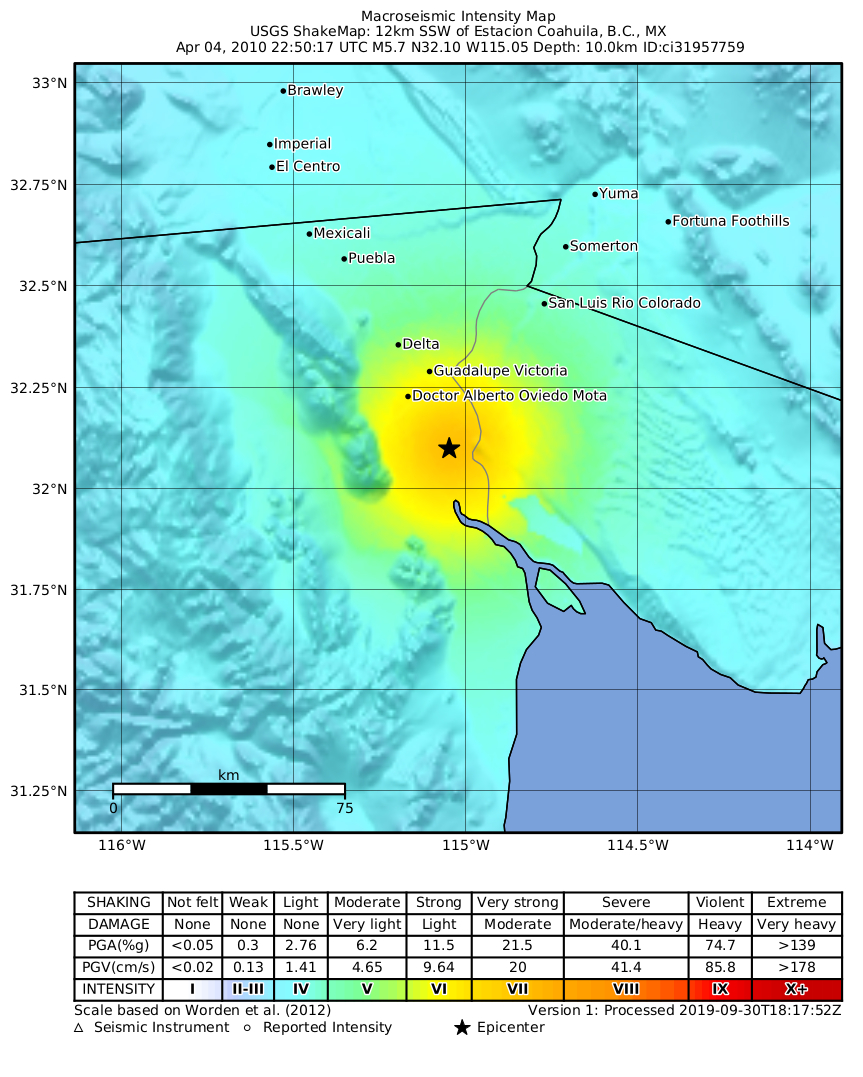
USGS shakemap of one of the strongest aftershocks

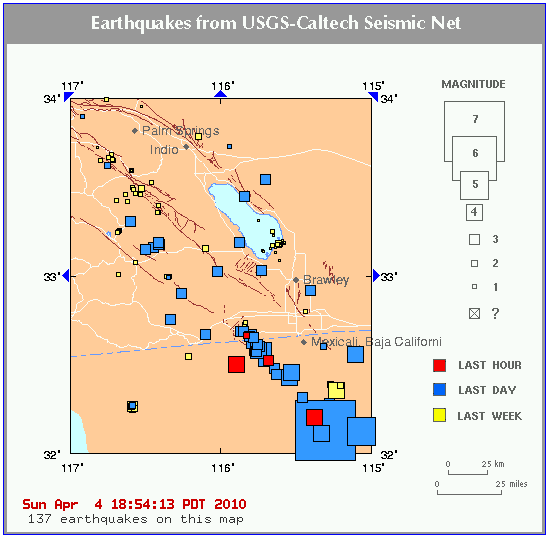
Map of northern Baja California and Southern California with earthquakes shortly after the main earthquake.

Four aftershocks with a magnitude of at least 5 have been reported; one at a magnitude of 5.2, one at 5.4, one at 5.1, and one at a magnitude of 5.7, all four within one hour. Additionally, a 5.3 aftershock hit the region very close to the mainshock epicenter on April 8, at approximately 9:44 AM local time. There have been at least nine large aftershocks in total.

By six hours after the earthquake, more than 90 aftershocks or triggered earthquakes between magnitude 3.0 and 5.1 were recorded in northern Baja California and Southern California. This included a magnitude 3 event 5 kilometers (3.1 mi) off the coast of Malibu, California. By the early hours of the following morning, scientists had measured 100 aftershocks.

Pat Abbott, a professor emeritus of geology at San Diego State University, said, "Any quake of this size seems to pass some kind of threshold where it's large enough to disturb or trigger other faults. In cases like this, that often means increasing stress on other faults, which makes them more prone to movement. The energy seems to be moving northward toward the San Andreas Fault. I don't want to anthropomorphize, but it's like this quake was goading the San Andreas." It remains to be seen how the 1,300 km (810 mi) San Andreas Fault was affected by these temblors. The southern section of the San Andreas Fault worries scientists, because it has not ruptured in more than 300 years. The region also includes other faults, including the Imperial Fault Zone.

In the early morning hours of April 10, 2010, an aftershock measuring magnitude 4.4 was felt throughout most of Southern California and Baja California. It was said to have lasted about ten seconds. No injuries or damage were reported. Another aftershock measuring a similar magnitude struck Southern California on the morning of April 11.

Seismologists in the California Institute of Technology of Pasadena announced a 10 percent chance of another earthquake on the same magnitude (7.3) or greater to strike within the first week, and 5 percent in the rest of the month of April 2010. It also falls on the state of California's Earthquake Preparedness month, as state and FEMA officials urge the state citizens to take preparations, and schools and businesses conduct earthquake drills across the state. The California Geological survey added 50 new faults to its map of faults several weeks after the earthquake.

Geological field work as of April 5, 2010, by Dr. Thomas Rockwell, professor of geology at San Diego State University, indicates about one meter of right-lateral surface faulting and 0.3 to 0.5 meters of vertical road offset on a fault that is located east of Laguna Salada Fault. Whether or not this is the Cerro Prieto Fault is unclear as of April 5. This is a developing field situation, as geologists are working to locate and measure the lateral extent of the surface faulting.

A strong aftershock with a magnitude of 5.7 occurred on June 14, 2010, at 9:26:58 PM PDT, with an epicenter near Ocotillo in southwestern Imperial County and a focal depth of 5.0 km.

On July 7, 2010, a 5.4-magnitude earthquake, triggered by the April 10, 2010, quake, occurred on the San Jacinto Fault, the most seismically active fault in California, and one of two that exhibited signs of increased pressure following the Mexico quake. It was centered 15 miles (20 kilometers) northwest of the town of Borrego Springs. The main quake in April had transferred stress to fault zones farther north, triggering the aftershock. The quake rattled buildings in downtown Los Angeles, toppled bottles off shelves, and briefly halted rides at Disneyland.

== Impact ==
=== Mexico ===
Baja California state capital Mexicali was reported by Comisión Federal de Electricidad (CFE) Director General Alfredo Elías Ayub as being without electricity. There were at least two fatalities in Mexicali, one of which was caused by a collapsed house. At least 100 people were injured in Mexicali and its suburbs. Multiple fires were caused by ruptured natural gas lines and damaged propane tanks, and people were stuck in collapsed buildings as of the day after the quake. Major damage to irrigation systems occurred, severely impacting over 80,000 acres of agriculture in the Mexicali Valley. Groundwater flowed to the surface, flooding fields and damaging hundreds of miles of irrigation canals. 25,000 people overall were impacted by the earthquake.

CNN reported that, "Pictures from Mexicali showed the sides ripped off buildings, toppled telephone poles, cracked roads, and supermarket aisles strewn with food that had fallen off shelves." Damage was also reported in a state government building in construction, and windows were broken at the Chamber of Commerce in the city. According to the San Diego Union Tribune, the largest hospital in Mexicali sustained damage and was moving patients to other facilities.

The quake was felt for about 40 seconds in Tijuana, Baja California, located 174 kilometers (108 mi) to the west-southwest, where it caused buildings to sway and knocked out power in parts of the city. Families celebrating Easter ran out of the homes. A falling tree damaged a city water tank. Rescuers trying to reach Mexicali from Tijuana were slowed by a landslide along the highway. The earthquake cracked the main aqueduct that carries Colorado River water from Mexicali to Tijuana, causing limitations on the water supply in Tijuana.

The day after the quake, Baja California governor José Guadalupe Osuna asked the federal government for a state of emergency to be declared. President Felipe Calderón visited the Mexicali area on Monday, April 5, to inspect the damage first-hand.

=== United States ===
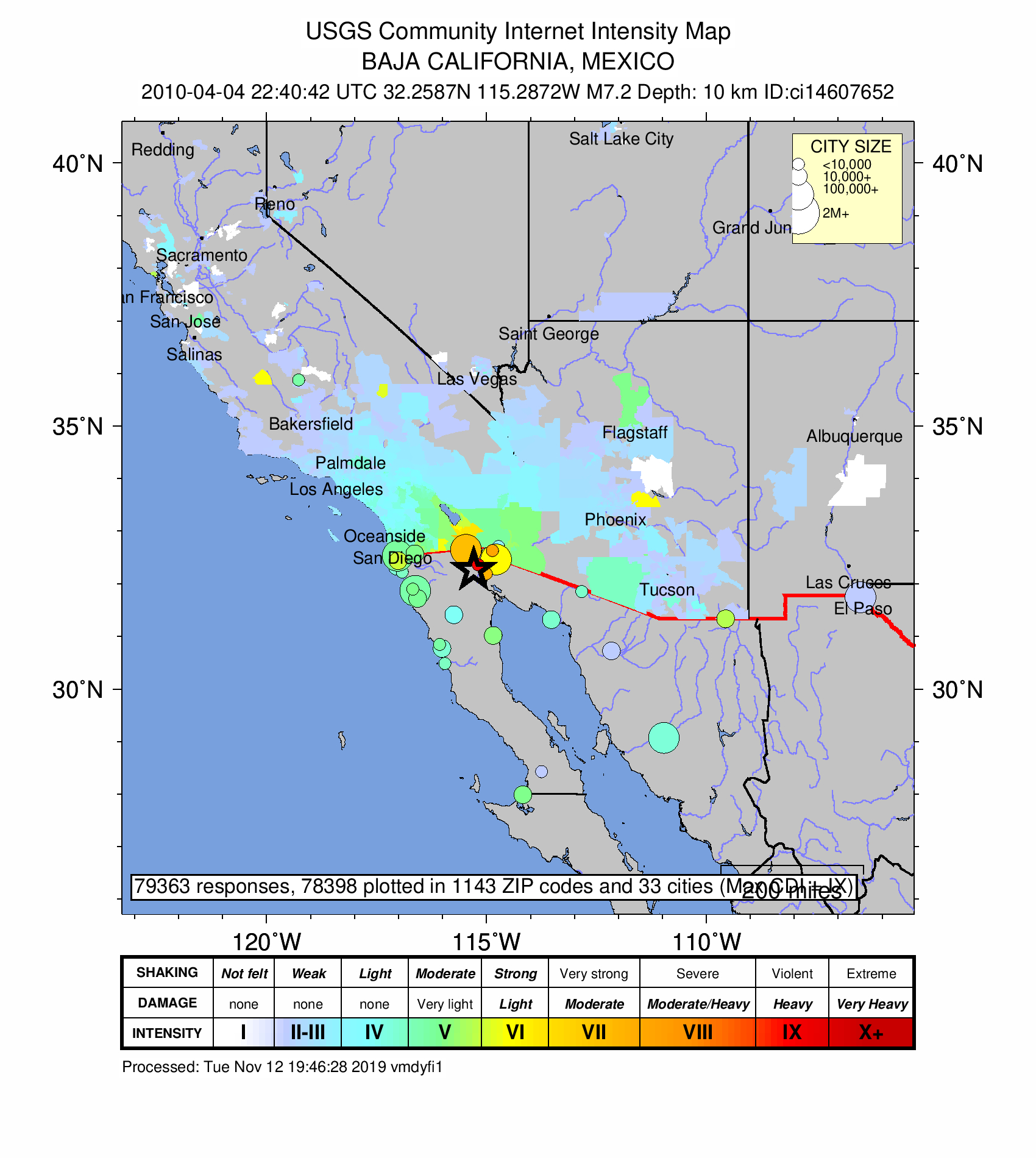
A map showing the number of responses by people to USGS about the quake.

United States Geological Survey seismologist Dr. Lucy Jones said at least 20 million people in the United States and Mexico, including most of Southern California, felt the quake. Sporadic power outages were reported throughout southern California. Skyscrapers shook in San Diego, California, 180 kilometers (110 mi) northwest of the epicenter. The earthquake broke at least two water mains, one at a Nordstrom department store in Fashion Valley Mall and another at Mission Bay High School. San Diego International Airport also had a water leak at Gate 33 in Terminal 2, and the terminal was evacuated for about 10 minutes due to fears of a natural gas leak. The Coronado Bridge over San Diego Bay was briefly closed by the California Highway Patrol as a precautionary measure. The Sheraton Hotel and Marina was evacuated when cracks were discovered in the floors and reoccupied once deemed to be safe.

Electric service was disrupted across most of the Imperial Valley. In Calexico, California, Fire Chief Peter Mercado said that there were structural damage, leaking gas lines, and damage to the town's water system, but that no one was hurt. Calexico Police Lieutenant Gonzalo Gerardo said, "Downtown is going to remain closed until further notice. I honestly doubt that it will reopen soon. You've got a lot of cracks. You've got a lot of broken glass. It's unsafe for people to go there." The Calexico border crossing on California State Route 7 and a section of Interstate 8 were both closed.

In El Centro, California, gas leaks, water main breaks, and collapsed chimneys and balconies were reported. A man was injured when he fell during the quake, and another man was injured when a sign fell on him. One city hospital had so many people, that The Salvation Army sent a truck with water canteens and sandwiches.

It was felt in downtown Los Angeles, where there were no immediate reports of damage, although the Los Angeles Fire Department was put on alert. It was reported that some people were stuck in an elevator in Disneyland, Anaheim, and in a Century City high-rise in Los Angeles. The rides in Disneyland were temporarily closed for inspection. In the Yuma, Arizona, area, 3,369 residents experienced a "relatively momentary [power] outage" from the quake, "but most were back in service shortly afterward".

== See also ==
- 2019 Ridgecrest earthquakes
- Cerro Prieto Geothermal Power Station
- Lists of 21st-century earthquakes
- List of earthquakes in 2010
- List of earthquakes in the United States
- List of earthquakes in California
- List of earthquakes in Mexico
- Seiche
