= Sierra de Los Cucapah =

Mountain range of the Peninsular Ranges in Baja California, Mexico

Coordinates: 32.39968°N 115.50064°W

Sierra de Los Cucapah is a mountain range in Baja California state, Northwestern Mexico. It is located south of Mexicali. The range is named after the Cocopah who arrived in the area around 700 b.c and still live in the area.

The Sierra de los Cucapah are north–south trending mountains of the Peninsular Ranges between the Laguna Salada basin to the west and the Cerro Prieto Volcano and Cerro Prieto Geothermal Power Station to the east.

The geothermal field is 40 kilometres (25 mi) south of Mexicali.

== Location ==
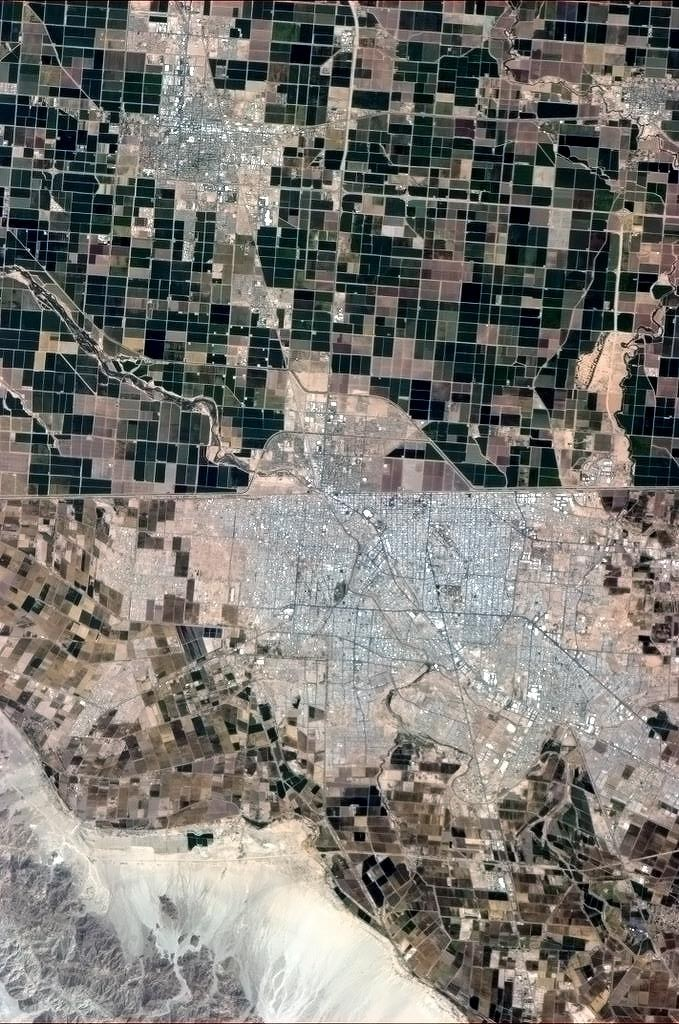
Mexicali, seen from the International Space Station, is situated south of the Mexico–US border

The location in relation to Mexicali is discernable in the aerial photograph at right, as the Sierra is visible in the lower left.

== View ==
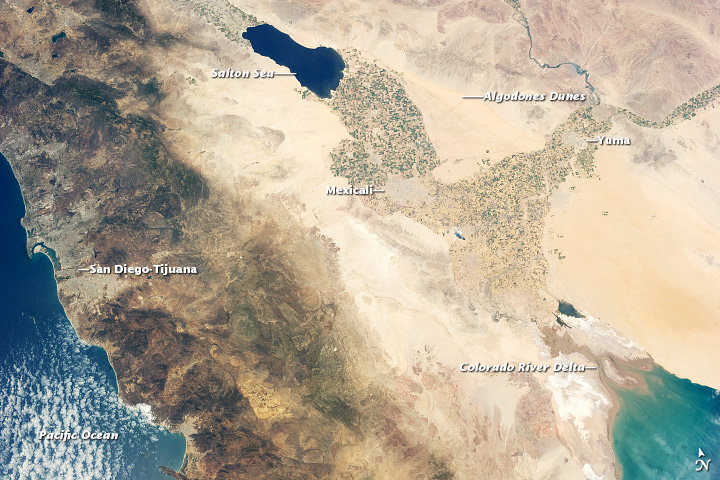
The region from orbit.
