= Yorba Linda Fault =

Geological fault in San Bernardino County, California

The Yorba Linda Fault or Yorba Linda Trend is a fault system that transects the Whittier Fault and extends from northeast Yorba Linda, California, to the southeastern portion of the Chino Hills and Chino Hills (city), in San Bernardino County, California.

The fault was discovered in the late 1990s and is known to have caused the M_{w} 5.5 2008 Chino Hills earthquake. The fault is believed to produce a M_{w} 6.0 earthquake at most.
