= Whittier Fault =

Geologic fault in eastern Los Angesles County in Southern California

- Location: eastern Los Angeles County
- Country: USA
- State: California

Characteristics
- Part of: Elsinore Fault Zone
- Length: 40 km (25 mi)

Tectonics
- Type: right-lateral strike-slip fault

The Whittier Fault is a geologic fault located in eastern Los Angeles County in Southern California, that is one of the two upper branches of the Elsinore Fault Zone, with the Chino Fault the second.

== Geology ==
The Whittier Fault is a 25-mile (40 km) right-lateral strike-slip fault that runs along the Chino Hills range between the cities of Chino Hills and Whittier. The fault has a slip rate of 0.098 to 0.118 inches (2.5 to 3.0 mm) per year. It is estimated that this fault could generate a quake of M_{w}6.0–7.2 on the moment magnitude scale.

== See also ==
- Puente Hills Fault
- San Andreas Fault
