= Laguna Salada (Mexico) =

Endorheic lake in Baja California, Mexico

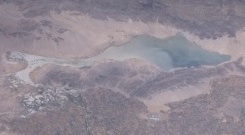

- Location in Baja California Location in Mexico
- Location: Sonoran Desert; Mexicali Municipality, Baja California
- Coordinates: 32.36°N 115.65°W
- Lake type: Endorheic basin
- Etymology: Salty lagoon in Spanish
- Primary inflows: rain dependent
- Primary outflows: Terminal (evaporation)
- Basin countries: Mexico
- Max. length: 60 km (37 mi)
- Max. width: 17 km (11 mi)
- Shore length^{1}: 250 km (160 mi)
- ^{1} Shore length is not a well-defined measure.

Laguna Salada (Spanish, "salty lagoon") is a vast dry lake some 10 meters below sea level in the Sonoran Desert of Baja California, 30 km (19 mi) southwest of Mexicali. Its name has been spelled as Laguna Maquata or Laguna Maguate, and it is also known as Laguna Salada and the Pattie Basin, Ha wi mək in Cocopa, Ha ’ša ai or Ša in Tipai, and ’Ha si in Paipai When dry, the flatness of the exposed lake bed sediments makes it a favoured location for recreational driving. It is also notorious for its dust storms when dry, usually the result of monsoonal thunderstorms during the summer. During times of significant rain the lagoon can fill completely with water, leaving the unpaved road along its west bank as the only means of traversing the area. Flanked by the Sierra de Los Cucapah and the Sierra de Juárez mountain ranges, the lake is approximately 60 km (37 mi) long and 17 km (11 mi) at its widest point.

== Tectonic activity ==
The lake itself is located on the bottom of a shallow depression, a graben, which is linked to the San Andreas Fault, and the East Pacific Rise as part of the Laguna Salada Fault. This fault is connected to the Salton Trough fault which holds a similar depression, the Salton Sink. This sink is bigger than Laguna Salada and contains the Salton Sea. The 2010 Baja California earthquake occurred here.

In the 2012 Boeing 727 crash experiment an airplane was deliberately crashed into the Laguna Salada.

== See also ==
- Lake Cahuilla - prehistoric lake near Laguna Salada
