= Great Southern California ShakeOut =

Earthquake preparedness drill

The Great California ShakeOut is an annual earthquake preparedness drill in California. It is one of the official regions in the Great ShakeOut Earthquake Drills movement.

The first drill, known as The Great Southern California ShakeOut, took place on November 13, 2008, was the largest earthquake drill in U.S. history up until that time, and involved 5.3 million participants. The Earthquake Country Alliance organized the Great Southern California ShakeOut.

This drill took place in homes, businesses, and schools. communities across Southern California also featured week-long events to connect communities with preparedness resources and the information and knowledge to prepare, respond, and recover in the event of a disaster. The drill is now an annual event enlarged to cover the entire state of California.

The Great California ShakeOut drill of 2009 attracted 6.9 million participants. The 2010 drill occurred on October 21 and attracted 7.8 million participants. In 2012 the drill involved 9.4 million participants, and for the first time, the drill included the region's rail system. In 2017, more than 10 million participants were involved.
