= Puente Hills Fault =

Geological fault in California, United States

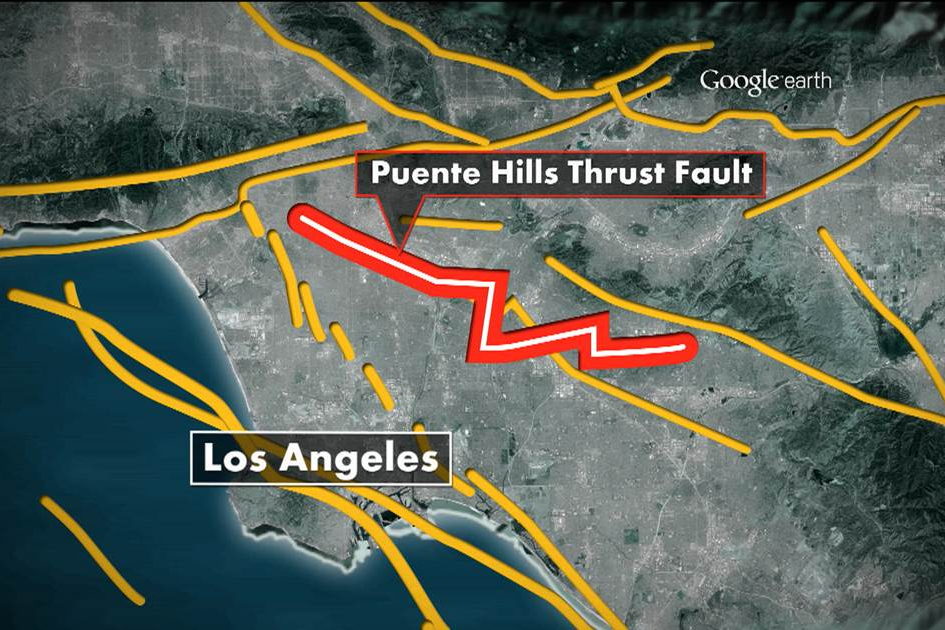
Map showing the location of the Puente Hills Fault

The Puente Hills Fault (also known as the Puente Hills Thrust Fault System) is an active geological fault that is located in the Los Angeles Basin in California. The thrust fault was discovered in 1999 and runs about 40 km (25 mi) in three discrete sections from the Puente Hills region in the southeast to just south of Griffith Park in the northwest. The fault is known as a blind thrust fault, as the fault plane does not extend to the surface. Large earthquakes on the fault are relatively infrequent but computer modeling has indicated that a major event could have substantial impact in the Los Angeles area. The fault is now thought to be responsible for one moderate earthquake in 1987 (the 1987 Whittier Narrows earthquake) and another light event that took place in 2010, with the former causing considerable damage and deaths.

== Geology ==
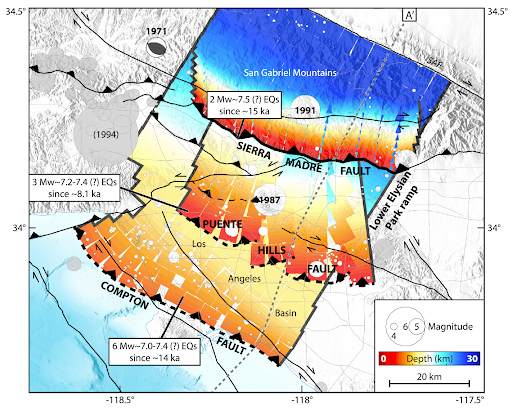
Map showing the location and depth of the Puente Hills Fault, Compton Thrust Fault, and the Sierra Madre Fault Zone

The Los Angeles Basin is situated along the coast of Southern California at the confluence of the Transverse Ranges and the Peninsular Ranges. The basin is under the influence of several strike-slip and blind thrust faults with geodetic studies providing evidence of the northern basin being shortened in the north–south or northeast–southwest directions at a rate of 4.5–5 millimetres (0.18–0.20 in) per year. Some of the shortening can be attributed to several known fault systems and two models have been proposed to account for the excess.

The Puente Hills Fault thrust system runs 40 km (25 mi) across the northern Los Angeles Basin from Downtown Los Angeles to near Brea and the Chino Hills in northern Orange County. It may account for some of the shortening in the northern Los Angeles Basin.

The Puente Hills Thrust Fault System was identified on a collection of seismic reflection profiles that were acquired for the petroleum industry. The data were made available to seismologists John Shaw and others for a comprehensive study of the region that was published in the bulletin of the Seismological Society of America in 2002. The thrust system is visually distinct as north dipping reflections in many of these representations. Stacking velocity measurements and sonic logging in the area helped to determine that the fault plane slopes at 25–30°. The system comprises three sections that strike generally east–west and are labeled the Los Angeles, Santa Fe, and Coyote Hills segments.

== Seismic risk ==
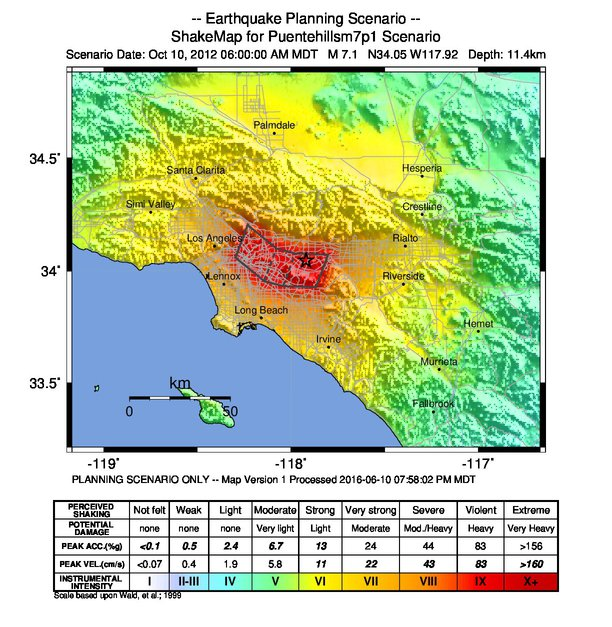
ShakeMap created by the United States Geological Survey for a M_{w} 7.1 scenario earthquake on the Puente Hills Fault

The frequency of a major rupture in the Puente Hills Fault is on the order of once per several thousand years. This frequency of occurrence is relatively low compared to the San Andreas Fault, which is a transform fault along a plate boundary. More specifically, geologists have determined that the fault has ruptured at least four times in the past 11,000 years. The magnitudes of such earthquakes are considered to have been 7.2 – 7.5 M_{w}. The highest magnitude in that range would be about fifteen times stronger than the 1994 Northridge earthquake in terms of energy release. That event was the strongest in recorded history for the Los Angeles metropolitan area.

The location of the fault directly below metropolitan Los Angeles leads it to be of great concern for the public, with various predicted scenarios in the event of an earthquake. If a similar earthquake were to happen today, the projected losses (determined from computer modeling) could be about $250 billion in property damage along with 3,000 to 18,000 deaths. Two simulations were produced that helped emergency planners and engineers visualize what may occur when a large earthquake takes place. The Southern California Earthquake Center developed a model that approximates the shaking from earthquakes of varying sizes, and the Federal Emergency Management Agency ran a simulation that translates the intensity of shaking into real-world property damage and loss of life.

== Earthquakes ==
The source of the October 1987 Whittier Narrows earthquake was determined to be the Puente Hills thrust system (unknown at the time) and could be identified by the fault-plane solution of the mainshock and aftershocks, fault-plane reflections (up to 8 km deep), and by high resolution seismic profiles at shallower depths.

The 5.1 Mw 2014 La Habra earthquake occurred on March 28, 2014, at 9:09:42 p.m. on the Puente Hills Fault and was centered 1 mile east of La Habra, California. It had a maximum Mercalli intensity of VII (Very strong) and caused a total of $10.8 million in damage.
