= Laguna Salada Fault =

Mexico–United States geological fault

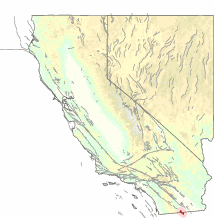
A United States Geological Survey map showing the Laguna Salada Fault outlined in red

The Laguna Salada Fault is a geological fault between the United States and Mexico. About 64–80 kilometers (40–50 mi) long, it straddles the Imperial County-California–Baja California border.

== Earthquakes ==
=== 1892 ===
According to some seismologists the 1892 Laguna Salada earthquake ranks among the largest earthquakes in California and Baja California in historic times. It occurred on 23 February 1892, and was centered near Laguna Salada in Baja California.

=== 2010 ===
The Laguna Salada Fault is thought to be the origin of the 2010 Baja California earthquake. Prior to this, the fault had not produced a major earthquake for over 100 years, since 1892.

== Faults ==
The Laguna Salada Fault is a probable southern continuation of the Elsinore Fault Zone in Southern California. These faults are considered to be secondary cohorts of the San Andreas Fault, and as such share some of the strike-slip motion between the North American plate and the Pacific plate.
