= Southern California Seismic Network =

The Southern California Seismic Network (SCSN) is a cooperative project of Caltech and the United States Geological Survey. The SCSN has benefited from numerous upgrade projects. TERRAscope, funded by the L. K. Whittier and ARCO Foundations, and NSF, provided the first 28 broadband and strong motion stations in the late 1980s and early 1990s. The TriNet project, from 1997 to 2002, funded by FEMA, California OES, USGS, and other partners, increased the number of broadband and strong motion stations to 155 and significantly improved the data communications and processing infrastructure. The SCSN is one of six organizations that form the larger California Integrated Seismic Network (CISN) project of Caltech, CGS, USGS, and U.C. Berkeley (2001 to present) provides funds for continued operation of the SCSN, improved robustness, and migration of operations toward statewide processing.
