= Southern California =

Geographic and cultural region of the US

Coordinates: 34°00′N 117°00′W

- Region
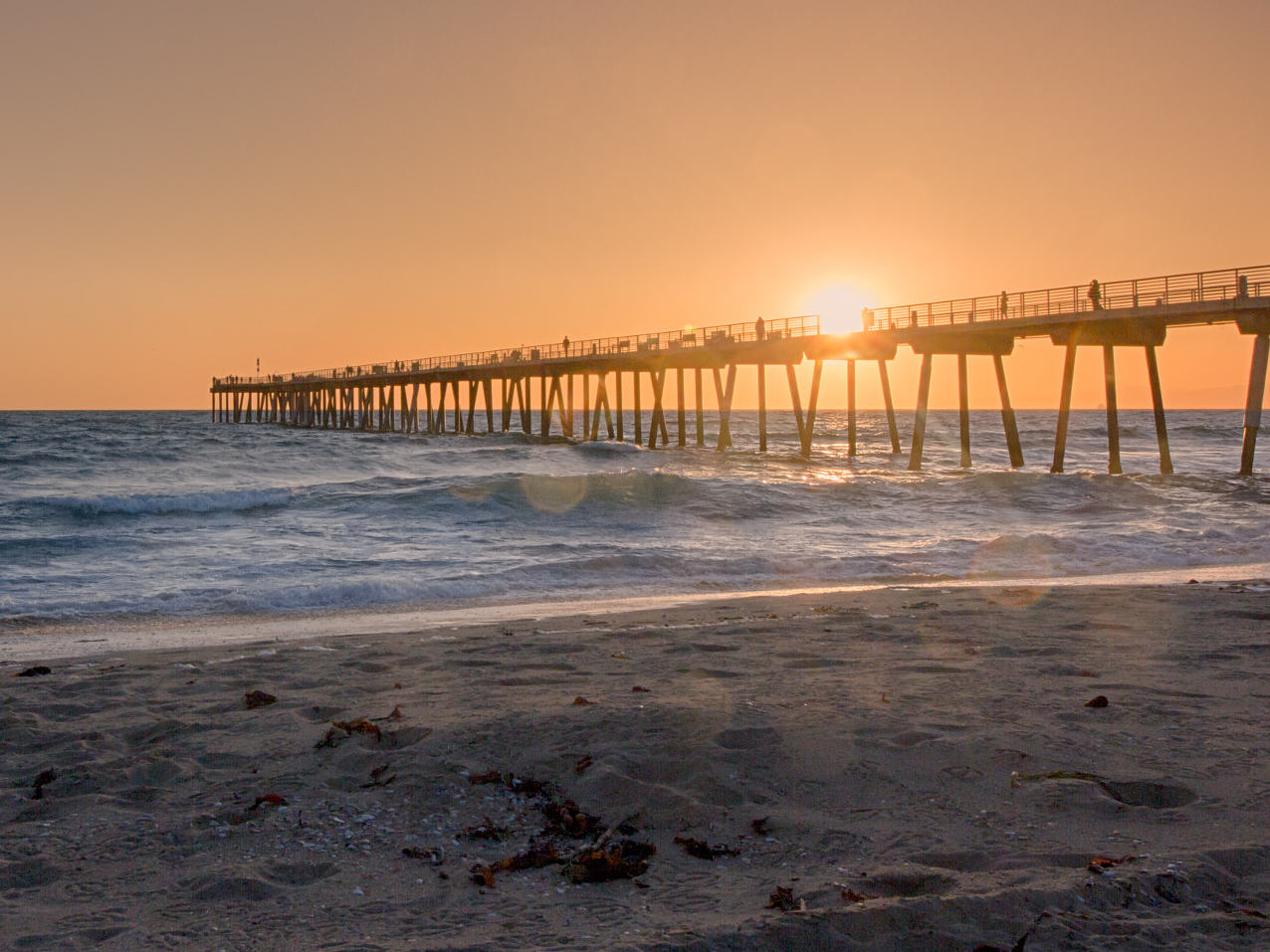
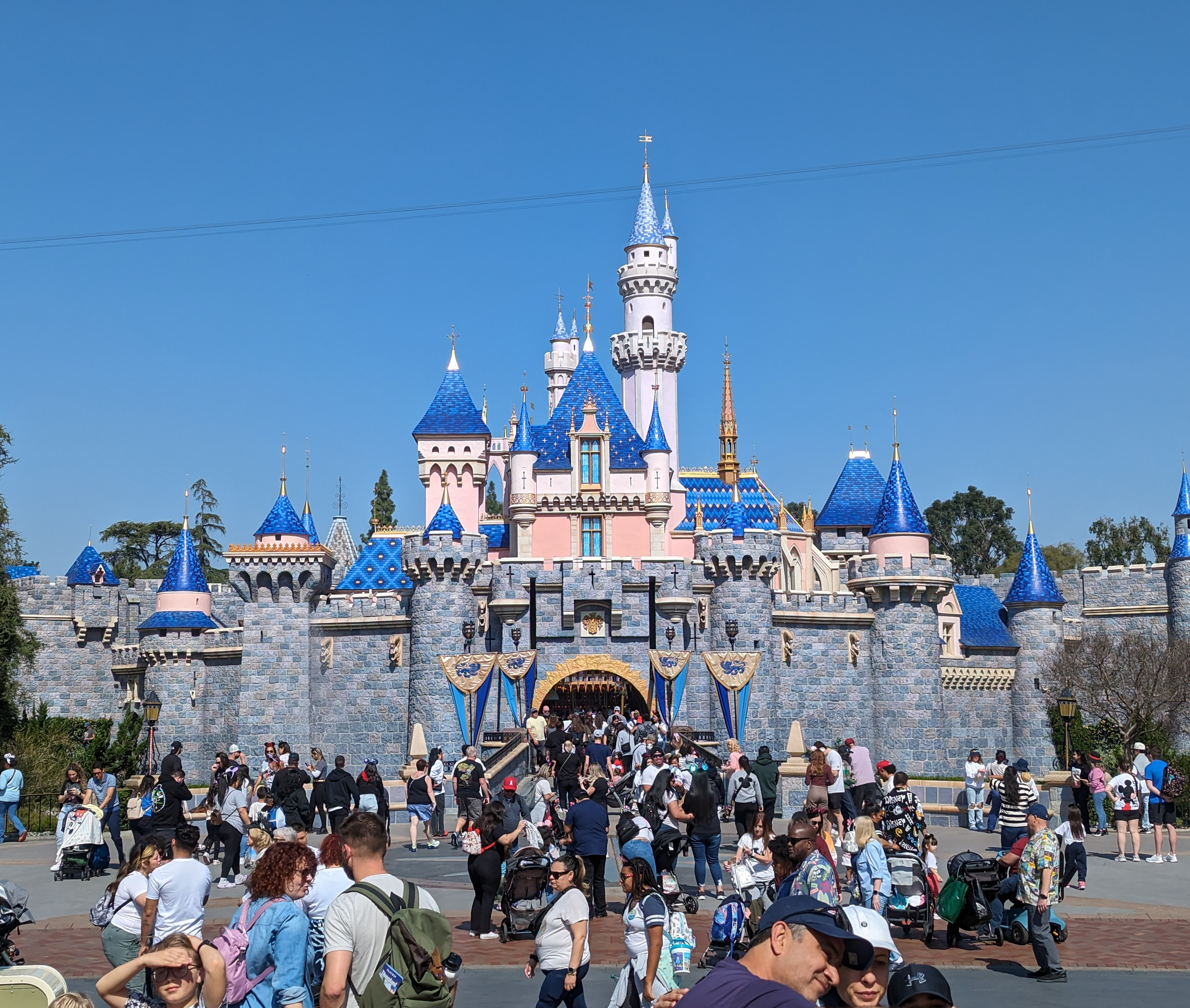
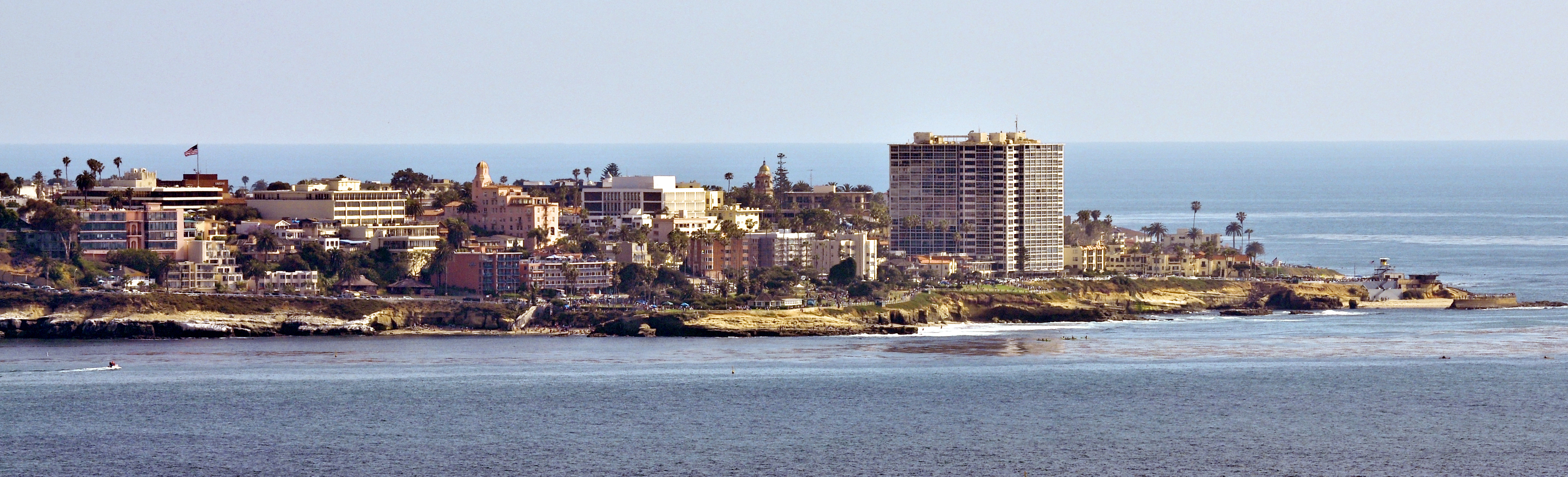
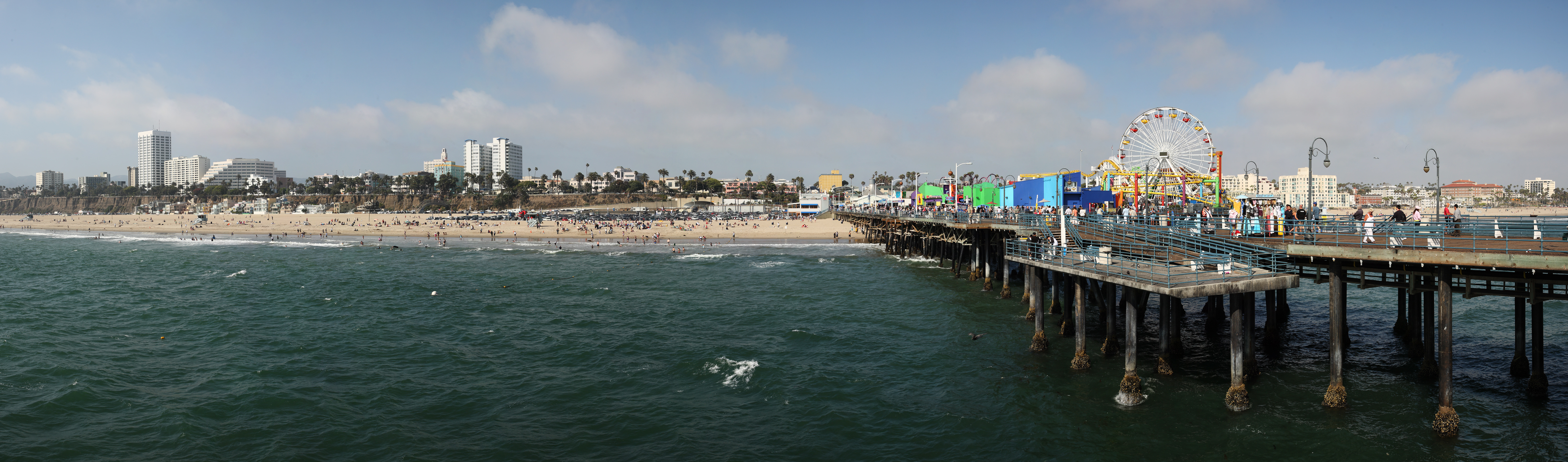
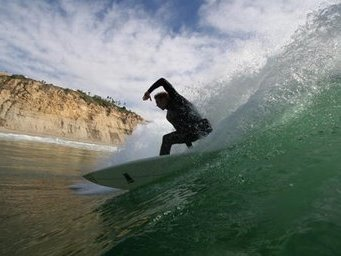
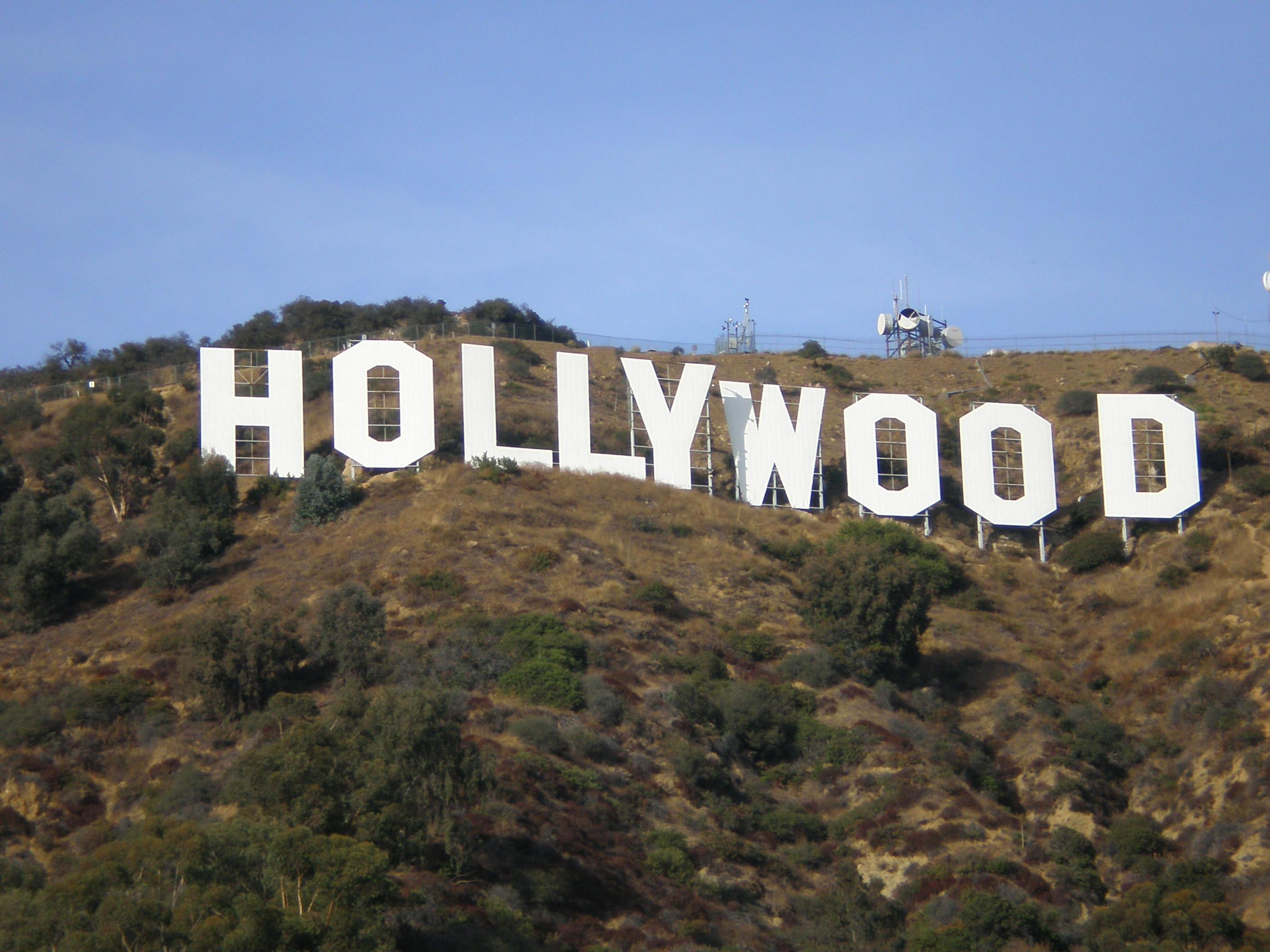
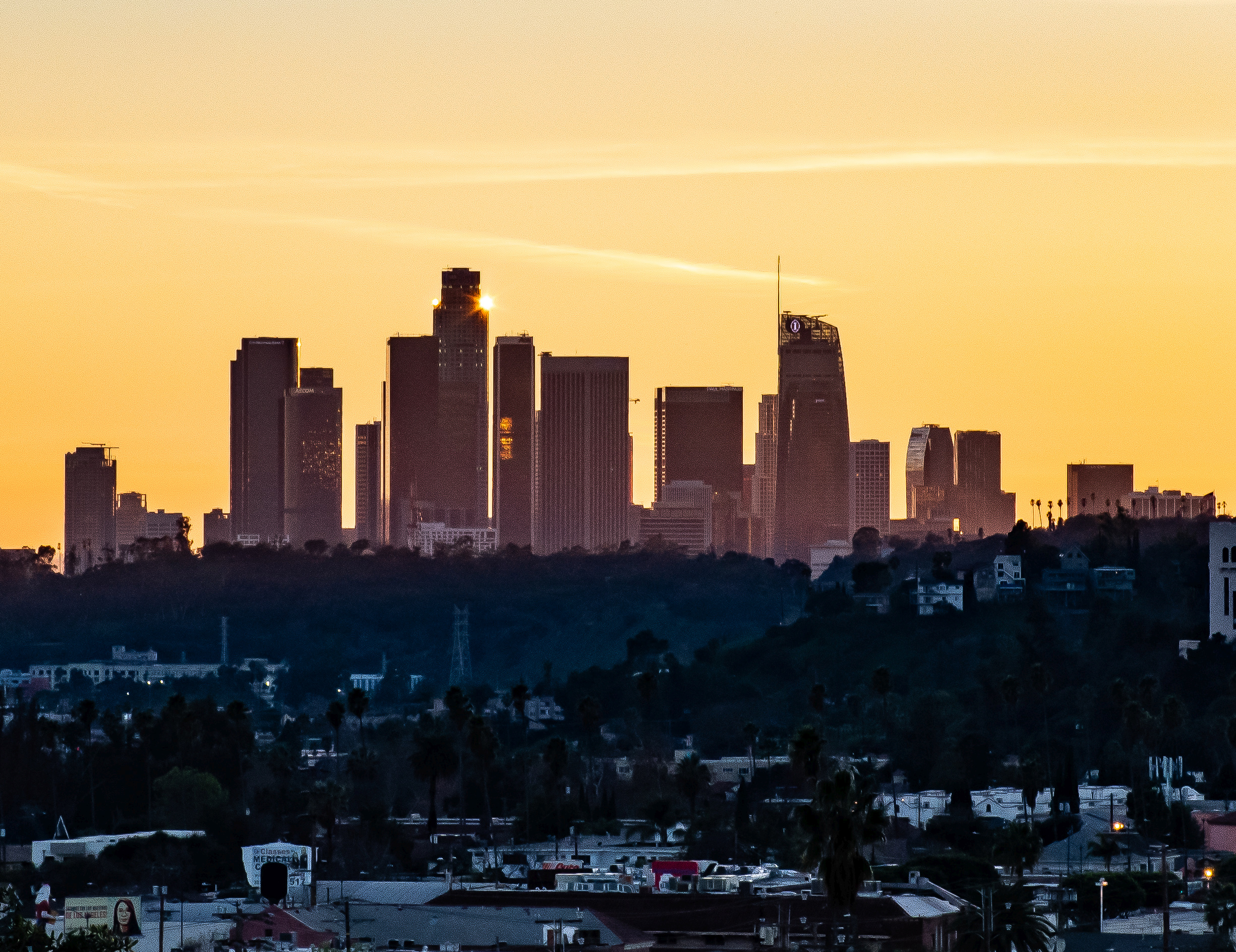
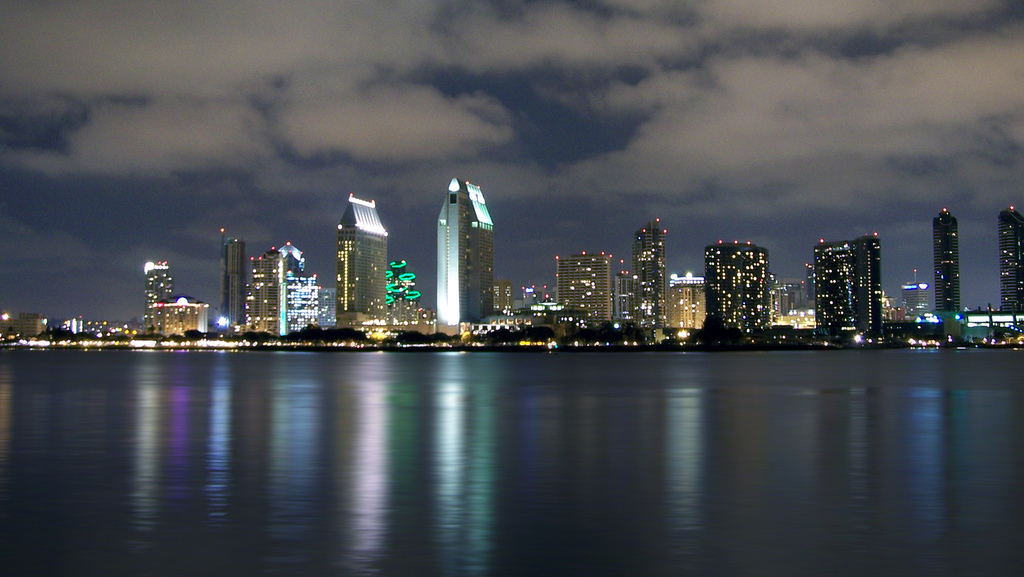
- Images top to bottom, left to right: Hermosa Beach Pier, Disneyland Resort, Village of La Jolla, Santa Monica Pier, Surfer at Black's Beach, Hollywood Sign, Downtown Los Angeles, San Diego Skyline

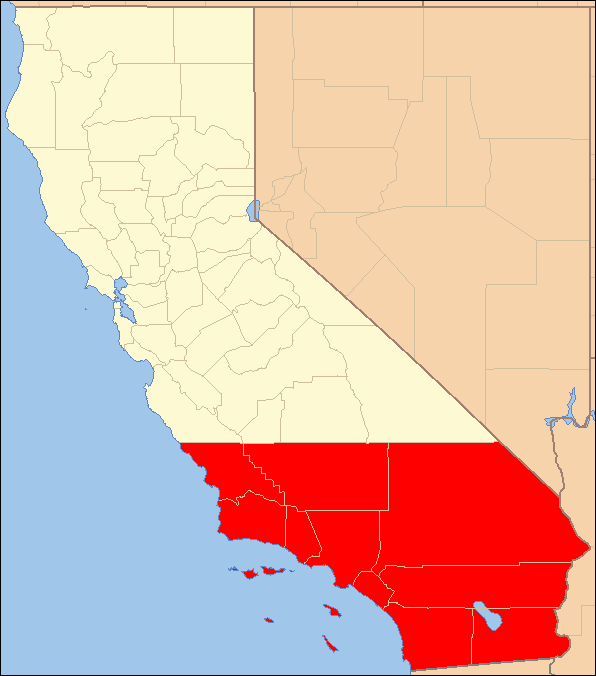
- Red: The ten counties of Southern California
- Interactive map of Southern California
- Country: United States
- State: California
- Counties: Imperial; Kern; Los Angeles; Orange; Riverside; San Bernardino; San Diego; San Luis Obispo; Santa Barbara; Ventura
- Largest city: Los Angeles

Area (10-county)
  - Total: 56,505 sq mi (146,350 km^{2})

Population (2020)
  - Total: 23,762,904
- Demonym: Southern Californian

GDP
  - Total: $1.95 trillion (2022)

Southern California (commonly shortened to SoCal) is a geographic and cultural region that generally comprises the southern portion of the U.S. state of California. Its densely populated coastal region includes Greater Los Angeles (the second-most populous urban agglomeration in the United States) and San Diego County (the second-most populous county in California). The region generally contains ten of California's 58 counties: Los Angeles, San Diego, Orange, Riverside, San Bernardino, Kern, Ventura, Santa Barbara, San Luis Obispo, and Imperial counties.

Although geographically smaller than Northern California in land area, Southern California has a higher population, with 23.76 million residents as of the 2020 census. The sparsely populated desert region of California occupies a significant portion of the area: the Colorado Desert, along with the Colorado River, is located on Southern California's eastern border with Arizona, and the Mojave Desert shares a border with Nevada to the northeast. Southern California's southern border with Baja California is part of the Mexico–United States border.

== Constituent metropolitan areas ==
Southern California encompasses eight metropolitan areas (MSAs), three of which together form the Greater Los Angeles Combined Statistical Area (CSA) with over 18 million people, the second-biggest CSA after the New York CSA. These three MSAs are the Los Angeles metropolitan area (Los Angeles and Orange counties, with 13.3 million people), the Inland Empire (Riverside and San Bernardino counties, including the Coachella Valley cities, with 4.3 million people), and the Oxnard–Thousand Oaks–Ventura metropolitan area (0.8 million people). In addition, Southern California contains the San Diego metropolitan area with 3.3 million people, Bakersfield metro area with 0.9 million, and the Santa Barbara, San Luis Obispo, and El Centro (Imperial County) metropolitan areas.

The Southern California Megaregion (or megalopolis) is larger still, extending northeast into Las Vegas, Nevada and south across the Mexican border into Tijuana.

== Significance ==
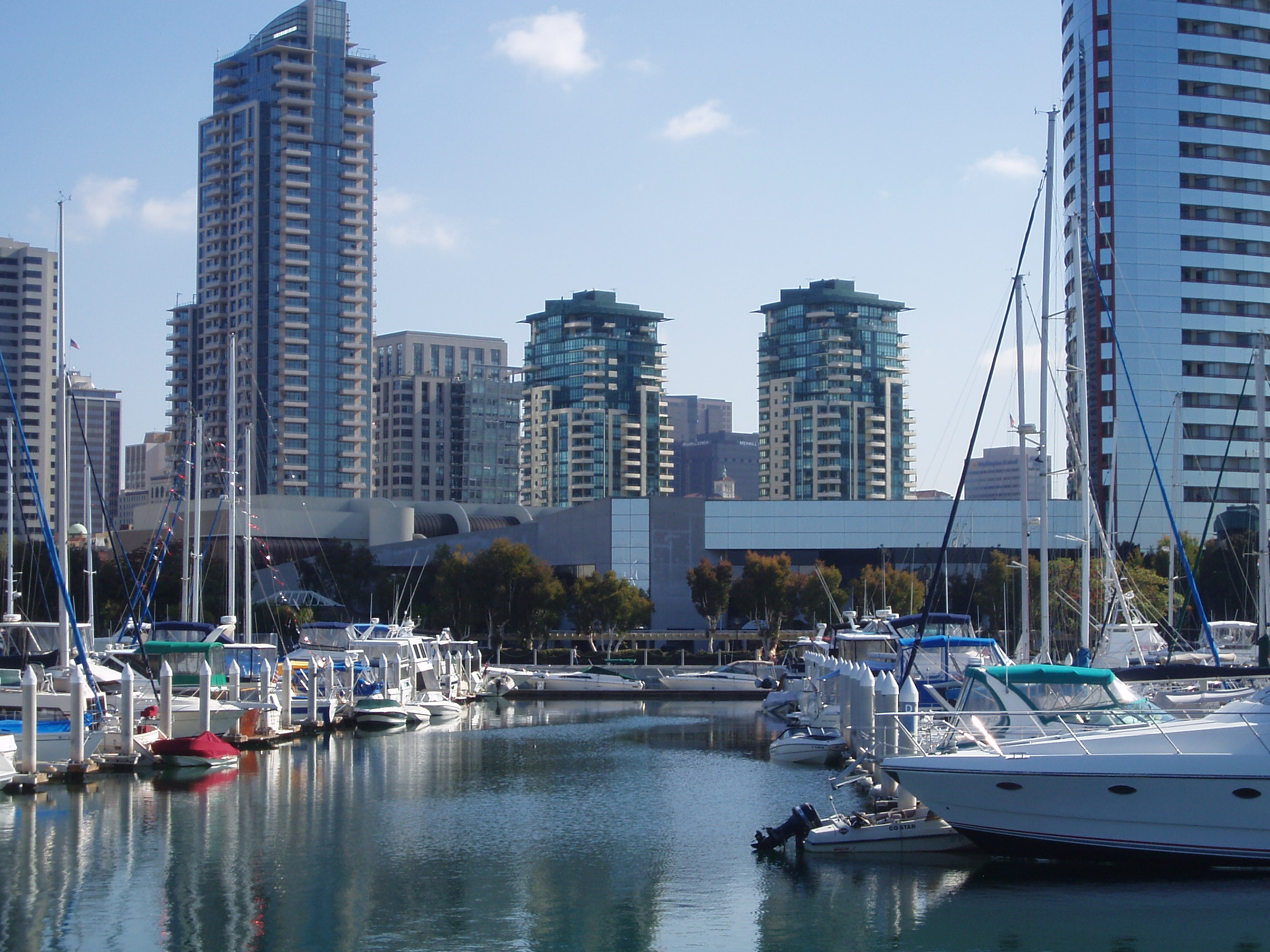
San Diego Marina district

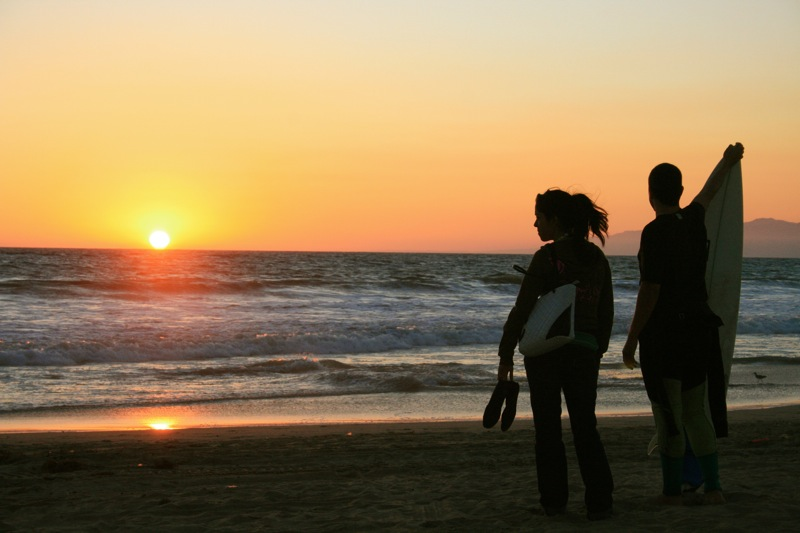
Sunset in Venice, a neighborhood in Los Angeles

Within Southern California are two major cities, Los Angeles and San Diego, as well as three of the country's largest metropolitan areas. With a population of approximately 4 million, Los Angeles is the most populous city in California and the second most populous in the United States. South of Los Angeles and with a population of approximately 1.4 million is San Diego, the second most populous city in the state and the eighth most populous in the nation.

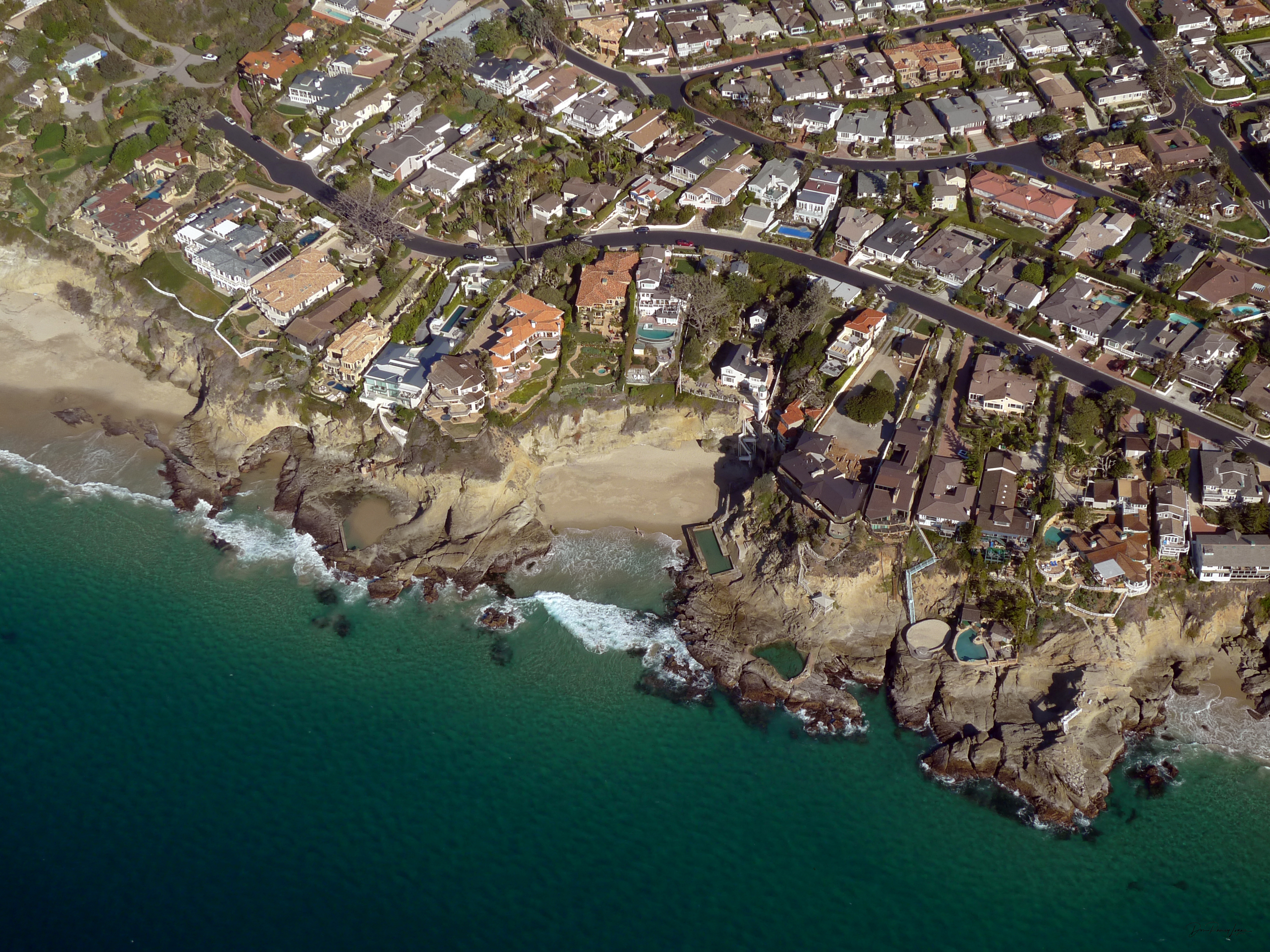
Three Arch Bay in Laguna Beach

The counties of Los Angeles, San Diego, Orange, Riverside, and San Bernardino are the five most populous in the state, and are among the top 15 most populous counties in the United States.

The motion picture, television and music industry are centered in the Los Angeles area in Southern California. Hollywood, a district of Los Angeles, gives its name to the American motion picture industry, which is synonymous with the neighborhood name. Headquartered in Southern California are The Walt Disney Company (which owns ABC), Sony Pictures, Universal Pictures, MGM, Paramount Pictures, and Warner Bros. Universal, Warner Bros., and Sony also run major record companies.

Southern California is also home to a large surf and skateboard culture. Companies such as Vans, Volcom, Quiksilver, No Fear, Stüssy, and Body Glove are all headquartered there. Skateboarder Tony Hawk; surfers Rob Machado, Timmy Curran, Bobby Martinez, Pat O'Connell, Dane Reynolds, and Chris Ward live in Southern California. Some of the most famous surf locations are in Southern California as well, including Trestles, Rincon, The Wedge, Huntington Beach, and Malibu. Large action sports events, including the X Games and the Boost Mobile Pro, have been held in Southern California, while the U.S. Open of Surfing is hosted at Huntington Beach. The region is also important to the world of yachting with premier events including the annual Transpacific Yacht Race, or Transpac, from Los Angeles to Hawaii. San Diego Yacht Club hosted the three America's Cup races from 1988 to 1995. The first modern-era triathlon was held in San Diego's Mission Bay in 1974. Since then, Southern California, and San Diego in particular, have become a mecca for triathlon and multi-sport racing, products, and culture.

Southern California has multiple sports franchises and networks, such as Fox Sports Net.

Many locals and tourists frequent the Southern California coast for its beaches. Some of Southern California's most popular beaches are Malibu, Laguna Beach, La Jolla, Manhattan Beach, and Hermosa Beach. Southern California is also known for its mountain resort communities, such as Big Bear Lake, Lake Arrowhead, and Wrightwood, and their ski resorts, like Bear Mountain, Snow Summit, Snow Valley Mountain Resort, and Mountain High. The inland desert city of Palm Springs is also popular.

== Northern boundary ==
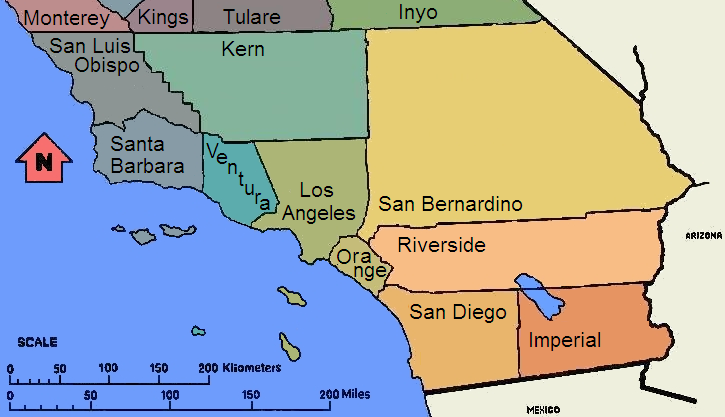
California counties below the latitude 35°45'N

Southern California is generally considered the area of California south of the latitude 35°45'N, approximately one-third of the state, formed by the northern boundaries of San Luis Obispo, Kern, and San Bernardino counties, which are not exactly a straight line. Another definition for Southern California uses Point Conception and the Tehachapi Mountains as the northern geographical barriers, especially when defining California's bioregions. In this definition, Owens Valley and Death Valley are part of the Southern California desert system. Because of the barrier formed by the Tehachapi and Sierra Nevada ranges, cartographer George Wheeler observed in 1876 that Northern California was better connected to Oregon and Nevada than it was to Southern California.

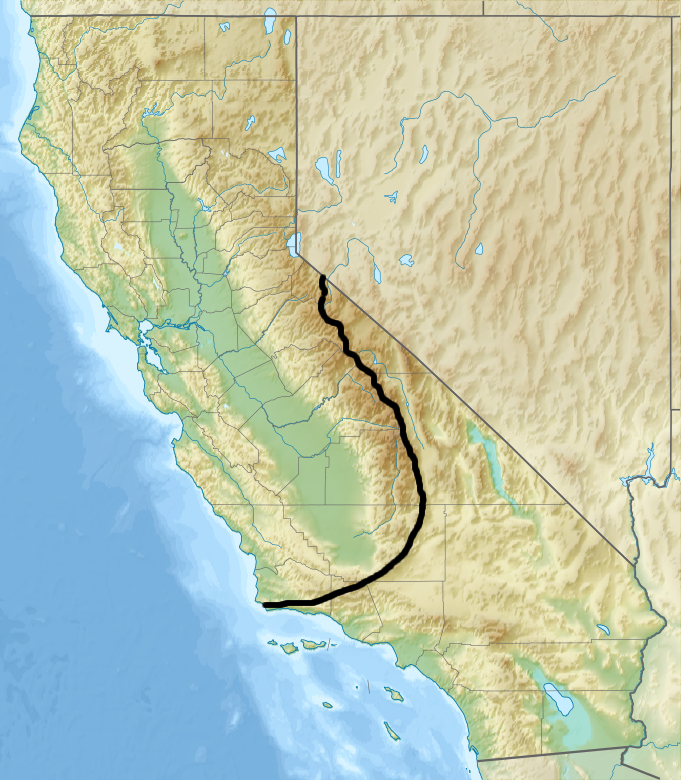
The Tehachapi and Sierra mountains formed a significant barrier to human travel before highways were built, and continue to affect weather, plants and animals.

Following the acquisition of the territory of California by the United States, several pro-slavery politicians attempted to arrange the division of Alta California at 36 degrees, 30 minutes, the line of the Missouri Compromise. Instead, the passing of the Compromise of 1850 enabled California to be admitted to the Union as a free state, preventing the southern half of California from becoming its own separate slave state.

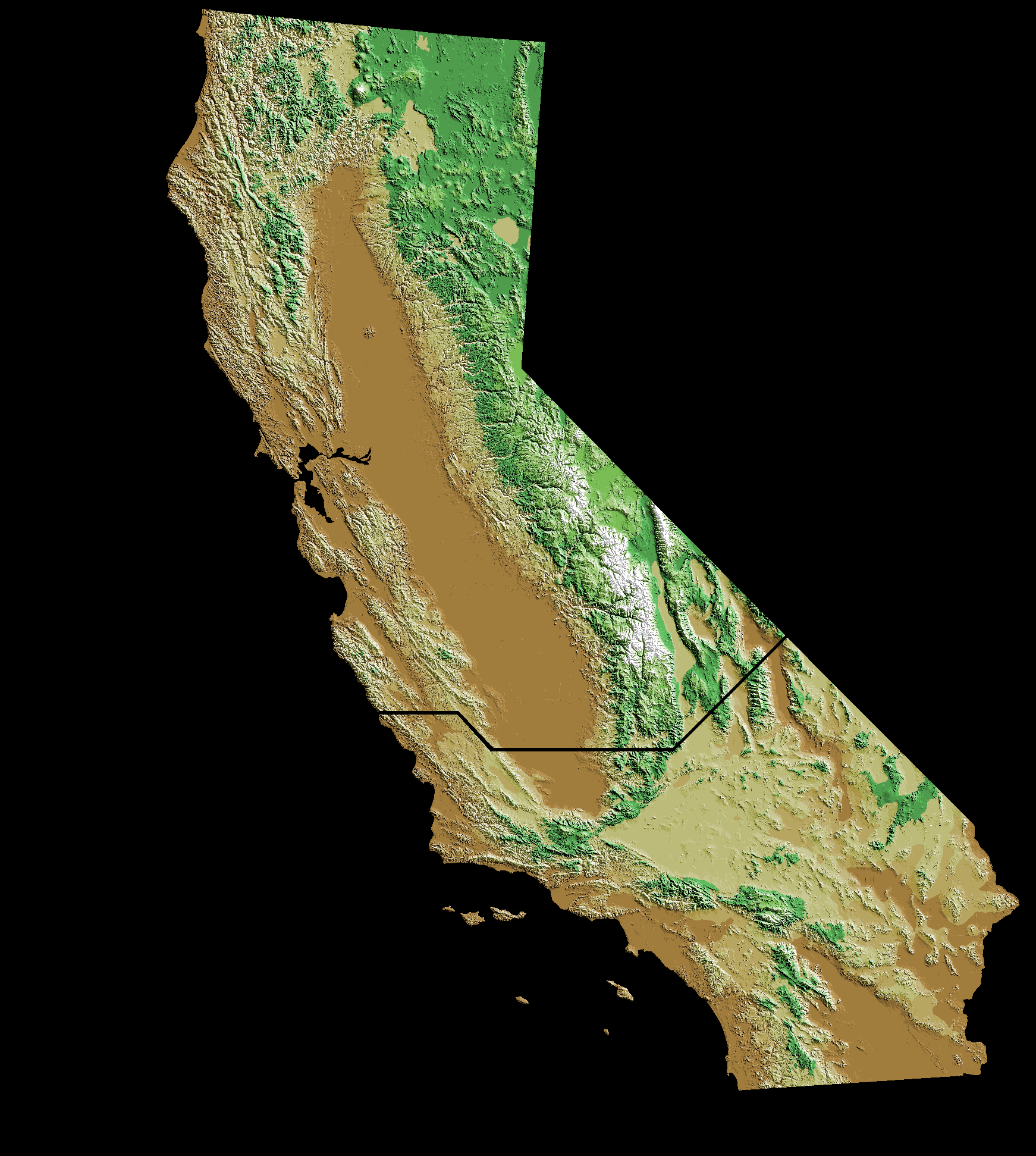
The Pico Act of 1859 proposed to divide California to create the Territory of Colorado in the south

Subsequently, southern Californians dissatisfied with inequitable taxes and land laws attempted several times in the 1850s to achieve a separate statehood or territorial status separate from northern California. The only successful proposal, the Pico Act of 1859, was passed by the California State Legislature and signed by State Governor John B. Weller. It was approved overwhelmingly by nearly 75 percent of southern California voters to form the proposed Territory of Colorado. The Pico Act bisected California starting at a latitude of six standard parallels south of the Mount Diablo meridian, then ducking southward around part of the Central Valley before cutting northeast to the California border. Six standard parallels is 144 miles south of Mount Diablo—which corresponds to the current northern border of San Luis Obispo County, at the latitude 35°45'N. The proposal was sent to Washington, D.C., with a strong advocate in Senator Milton Latham. However, the secession crisis following the election of Abraham Lincoln in 1860 and the subsequent American Civil War led to the proposal never coming to a vote.

In 1900, the Los Angeles Times defined Southern California as including "the seven counties of Los Angeles, San Bernardino, Orange, Riverside, San Diego, Ventura, and Santa Barbara." This definition left out San Luis Obispo and Kern counties. (At this time, Imperial County was part of San Diego County, not becoming its own county until three years later, in 1903.)

Southern California was the name of a proposed new state which failed to get on the 2018 California ballot. The ballot measure proposed splitting the existing state into three parts.

In December 2020, during the COVID-19 pandemic, the state government led by Governor Gavin Newsom divided the state into five regions for the purpose of issuing stay-at-home orders. The Southern California region consisted of the following counties: Imperial, Inyo, Los Angeles, Mono, Orange, Riverside, San Bernardino, San Diego, San Luis Obispo, Santa Barbara, and Ventura. However, Kern County was grouped with other counties of the San Joaquin Valley, California's central agricultural valley.

Population, land area & population density (2020)
County Ref.	Population	Land mi^{2}	Land km^{2}	Pop. /mi^{2}	Pop. /km^{2}
Los Angeles County	10,014,009	4,059.28	10,513.49	2,466.94	952.49
San Diego County	3,298,634	4,210.23	10,904.45	783.48	302.50
Orange County	3,186,989	792.84	2,053.45	4,019.71	1,552.02
Riverside County	2,418,185	7,209.27	18,671.92	335.43	129.51
San Bernardino County	2,181,654	20,068.01	51,975.91	108.71	41.97
Kern County	909,235	8,134.65	21,068.65	111.77	43.15
Ventura County	843,843	1,840.79	4,767.62	458.41	176.99
Santa Barbara County	448,229	2,733.94	7,080.87	163.95	63.30
San Luis Obispo County	282,424	3,300.85	8,549.16	85.56	33.03
Imperial County	179,702	4,175.54	10,814.60	43.04	16.62
Southern California	23,762,904	56,525.40	146,400.11	420.39	162.31
California	39,538,223	155,959.34	403,932.84	253.52	97.88

== Urban landscape ==
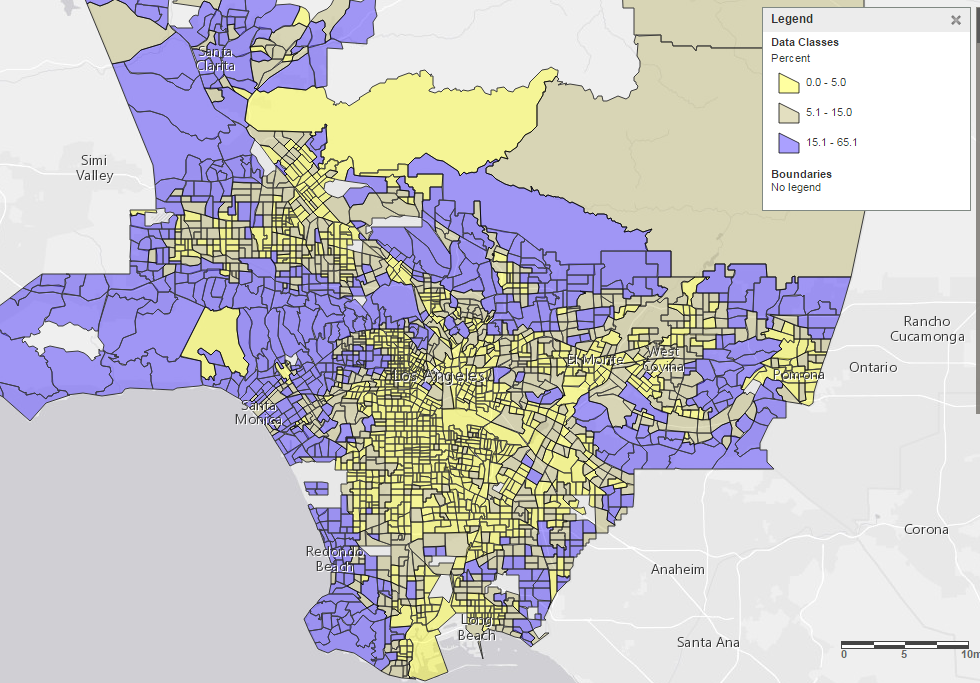
Percentage of households with incomes above $150,000 across LA County census tracts

Southern California consists of a heavily developed urban environment, home to some of the largest urban areas in the state, along with the Deserts of California (part of which was even proposed to become a new county due to cultural, economic and geographic differences relative to the rest of the more urban region) that have been left undeveloped. It is the third most populated megalopolis in the United States, after the Great Lakes megalopolis and the Northeast megalopolis. Much of Southern California is famous for its large, spread-out, suburban communities and use of automobiles and highways. The dominant areas are Los Angeles, Orange County, San Diego, and Riverside–San Bernardino, each of which are the centers of their respective metropolitan areas, composed of numerous smaller cities and communities. The urban area is also host to an international San Diego–Tijuana metropolitan region, created by the urban area spilling over into Baja California.

The main barrier to urbanization along the Interstate 5 corridor is Camp Pendleton. The cities and communities along Interstate 15 and Interstate 215 are so interrelated that Temecula and Murrieta have as much connection with the San Diego metropolitan area as they do with the Inland Empire. To the east, the United States Census Bureau considers the San Bernardino and Riverside County areas, Riverside-San Bernardino area as a separate metropolitan area from Los Angeles County. Newly developed exurbs formed in the Antelope Valley, north of Los Angeles, the Victor Valley, and the Coachella Valley with the Imperial Valley. Also, population growth was high in the Bakersfield-Kern County, Santa Maria, and San Luis Obispo areas.

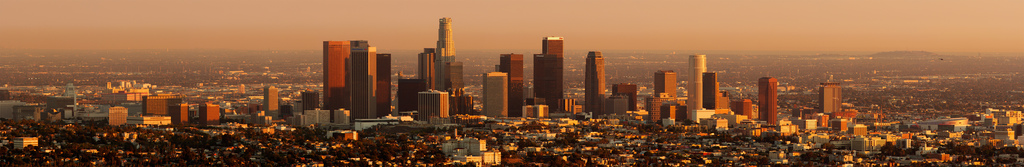
The skyline of Downtown Los Angeles as seen at sunset in October 2006. Standing 1,018 ft (310 m) high, with 73 floors, the U.S. Bank Tower was the West Coast's tallest building when it was built in 1989, until the neighboring Wilshire Grand Center surpassed it in 2017.

== Climate ==
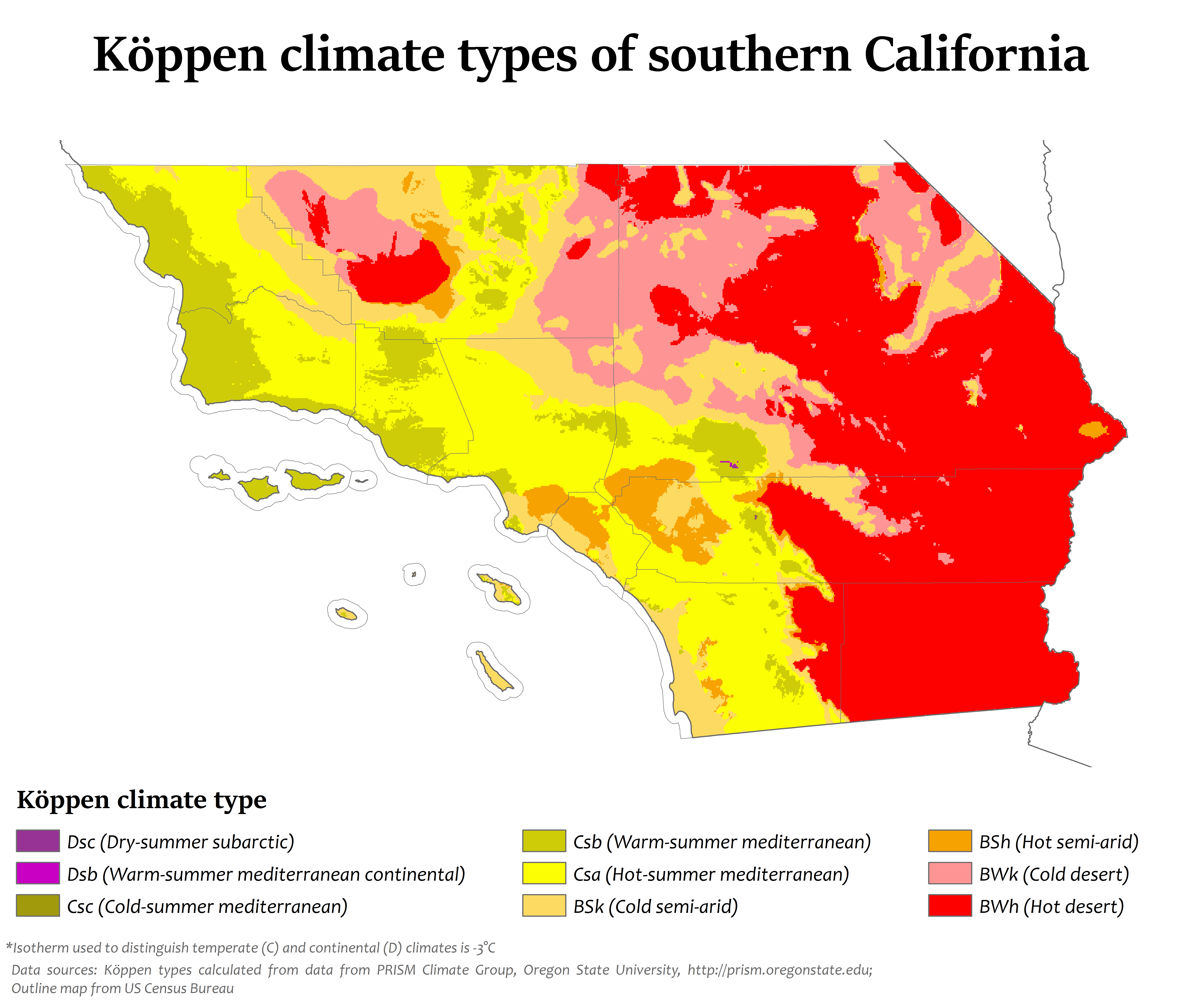
Köppen climate types of Southern California

Most of Southern California has a Mediterranean-like climate, with warm and dry summers, mild and wet winters, where cool weather and freezing temperatures are rare. Southern California contains other types of climates, including semi-arid, desert and mountain, with infrequent rain and many sunny days. Summers are hot or warm, and dry, while winters are mild, and rainfall is low to moderate depending on the area. Rain is infrequent, but is often heavy when it does occur, making flash floods an aspect of living in Southern California. This climatic pattern was alluded to in the hit song "It Never Rains in Southern California". While snow is very rare in lower elevations, mountains above 5,000 feet (1,500 m) receive plentiful snowfall in the winter.

Since the first decade of the 21st century, droughts and wildfires have increased in frequency as a result of climate change.

== Natural landscape ==
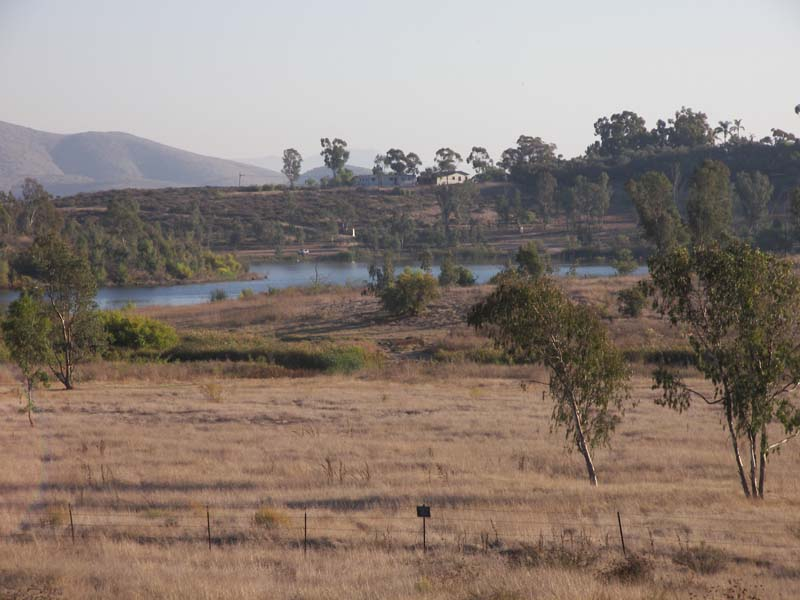
Proctor Valley in Chula Vista

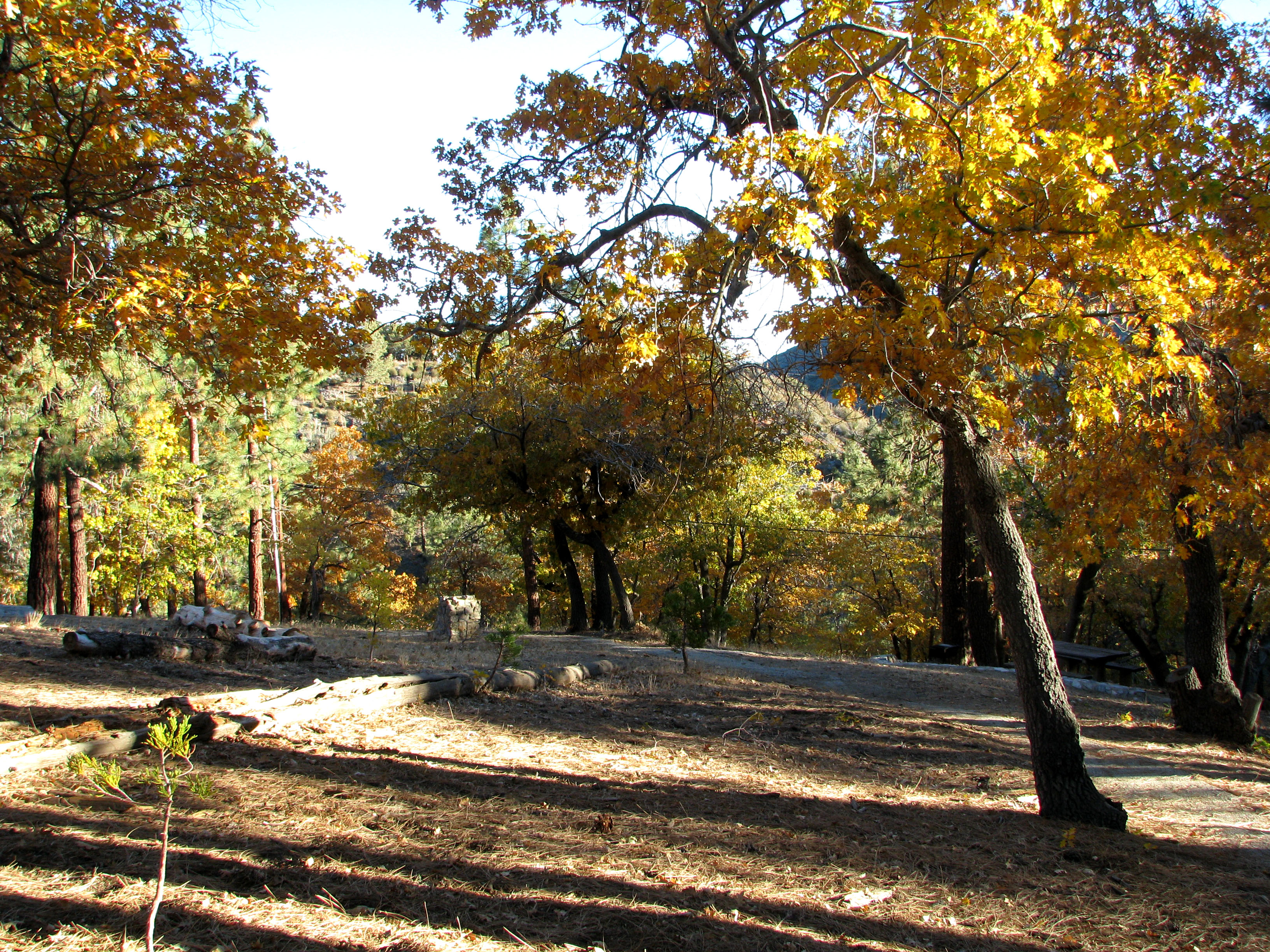
Autumn of 2008 in Southern California

Southern California consists of one of the more varied collections of geologic, topographic, and natural ecosystem landscapes in a diversity outnumbering other major regions in the state and country. The region spans from Pacific Ocean islands, shorelines, beaches, and coastal plains, through the Transverse and Peninsular Ranges with their peaks, and into the large and small interior valleys, to the vast deserts of California.

Introductory categories include:

- Category: Beaches of Southern California
- Category: Mountain ranges of Southern California
- Category: Rivers of Southern California
- Category: Deserts of California
- Category: Parks in Southern California

== Geography ==
=== Geographic features ===
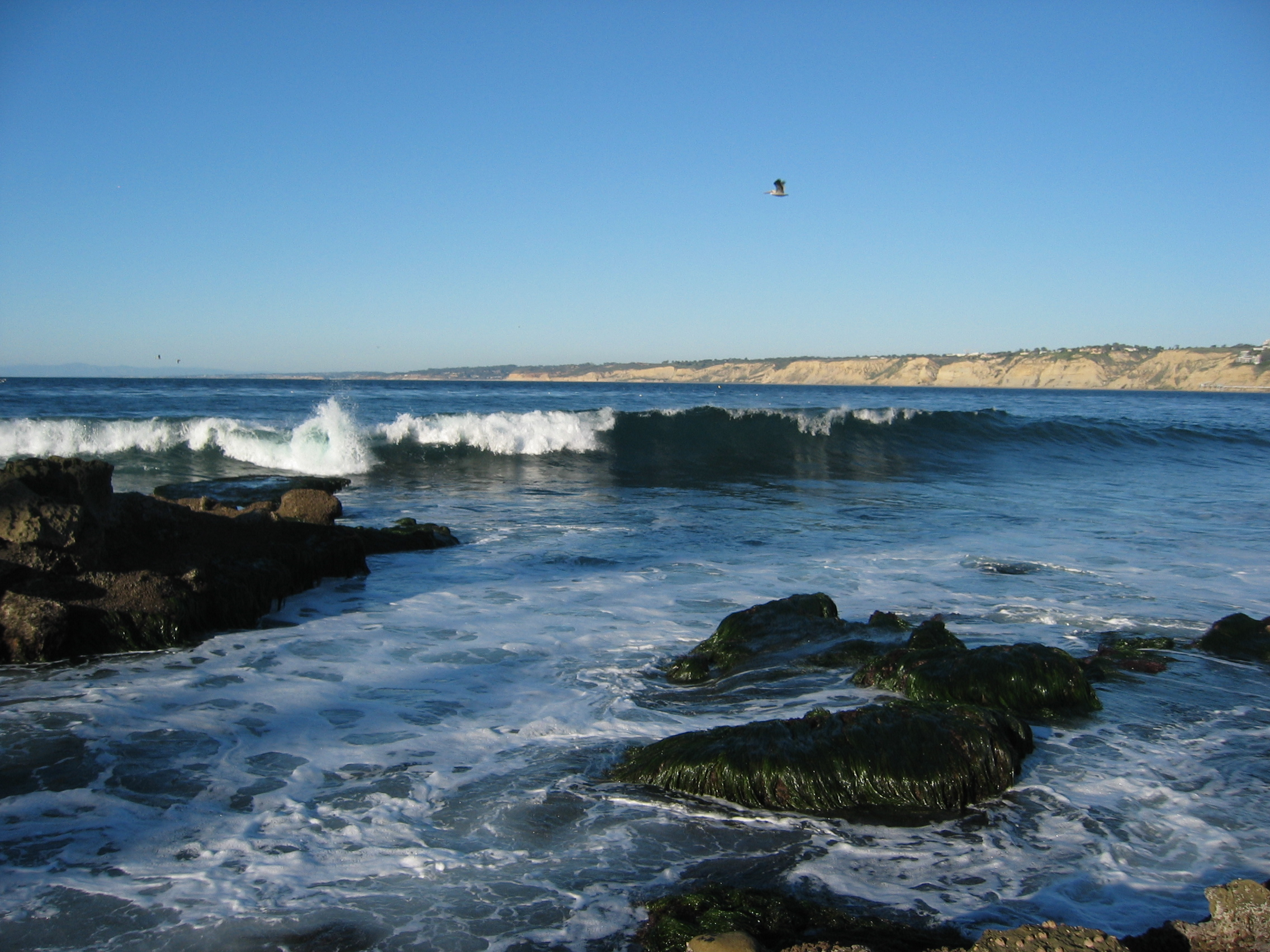
View from La Jolla Cove in San Diego

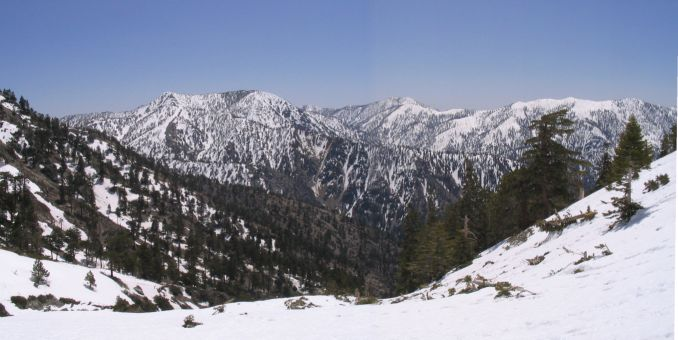
Peaks in the eastern San Gabriel Mountains, Angeles National Forest, San Bernardino County

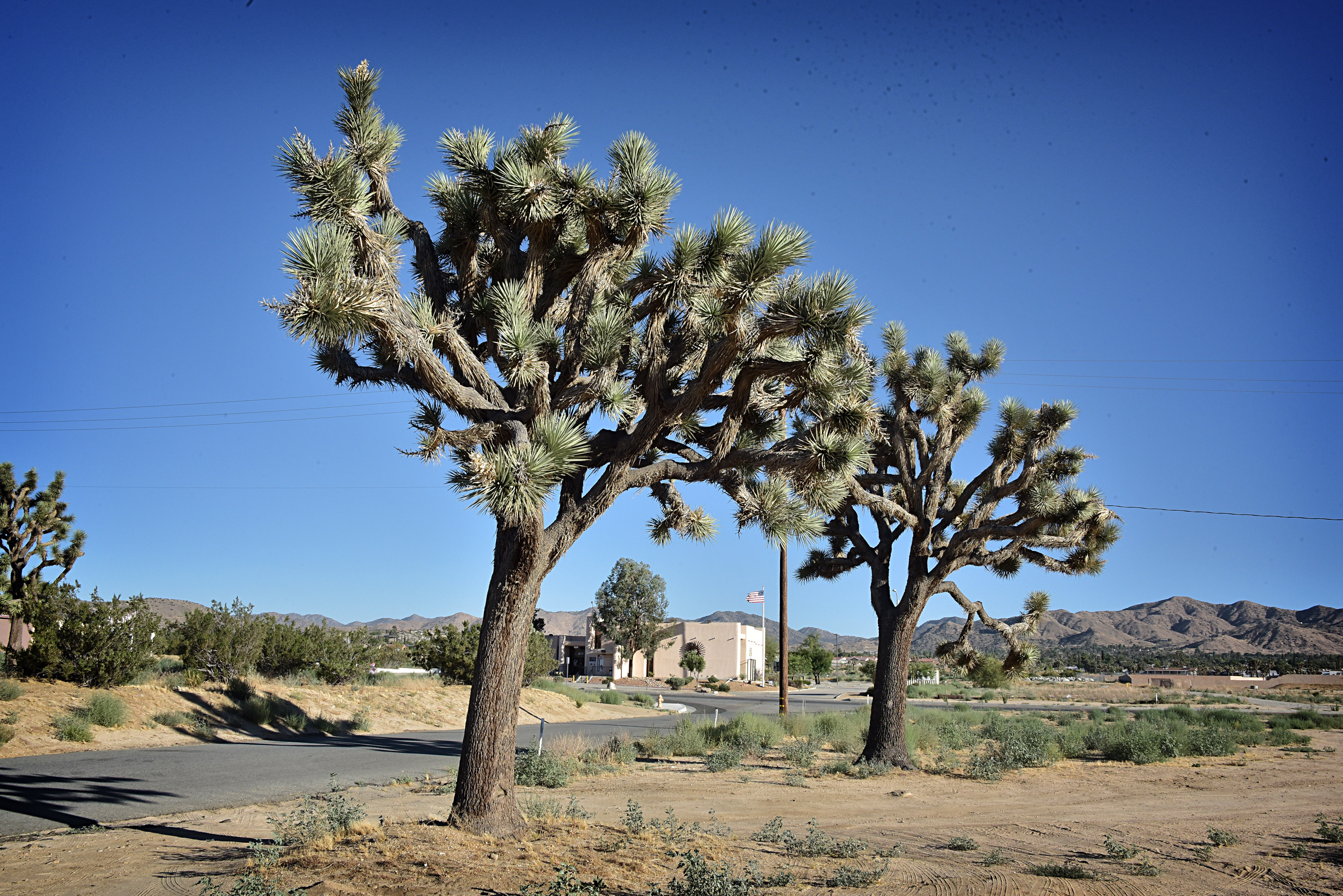
Yucca Valley with Visitor Center in Background in June 2017

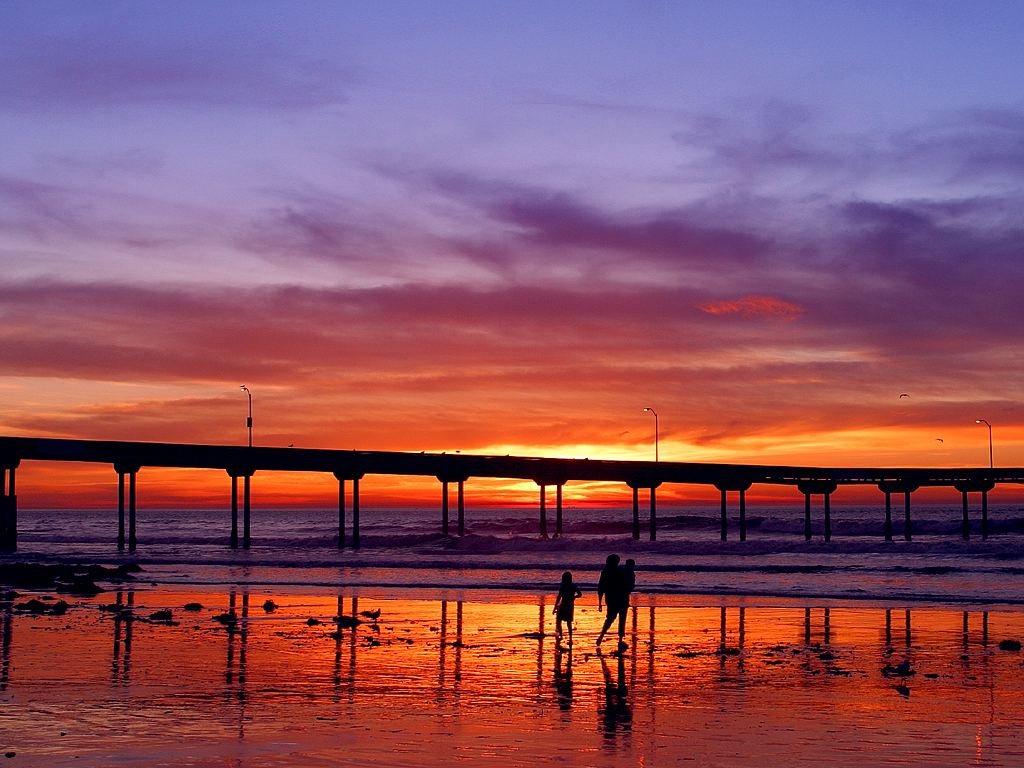
Ocean Beach Sunset in San Diego

- Algodones Dunes (Imperial County)
- Angeles National Forest (Los Angeles, San Bernardino, & Ventura Counties)
- Antelope Hills (Kern County)
- Antelope Valley (Los Angeles & Kern Counties)
- Arroyo Seco (Los Angeles County)
- Bacon Hills (Kern County)
- Baldwin Hills (Los Angeles County)
- Ballona Wetlands (Los Angeles County)
- Big Bear Lake (San Bernardino County)
- Bissell Hills (Kern County)
- Black Hills (Kern County)
- Bolsa Chica Estuary (Orange County)
- Buena Vista Hills (Kern County)
- Buena Vista Lake (Kern County)
- Cajon Pass (San Bernardino County)
- Calico Mountains (San Bernardino County)
- Channel Islands (Santa Barbara, Ventura & Los Angeles Counties)
- Castaic Lake (Los Angeles County)
- Chino Hills (Orange, Los Angeles, Riverside & San Bernardino Counties)
- Coachella Valley (Riverside County)
- Colorado Desert (San Bernardino, Riverside, Imperial, & San Diego Counties)
- Colorado River (San Bernardino, Riverside & Imperial Counties, Baja California & Sonora)
- Conejo Valley (Los Angeles & Ventura Counties)
- Cucamonga Valley (San Bernardino & Riverside Counties)
- Cuyamaca Mountains (San Diego County)
- Death Valley (San Bernardino & Inyo Counties)
- Diablo Range (Kern County)
- Diamond Valley Lake (Riverside County)
- Elk Hills (Kern County)
- Elkhorn Hills (San Luis Obispo County)
- El Mirage Lake (San Bernardino County)
- El Paso Mountains (Kern County)
- Gaviota Coast (Santa Barbara County)
- Greenhorn Mountains (Kern County)
- High Desert (Los Angeles, Kern, Inyo, & San Bernardino Counties)
- Horned Toad Hills (Kern County)
- Imperial Valley (Imperial County)
- Irish Hills (San Luis Obispo County)
- In-Ko-Pah Mountains (San Diego County)
- Inland Empire (Riverside & San Bernardino Counties)
- Jacumba Mountains (San Diego County)
- Jawbone Canyon (Kern County)
- Kern River (Kern County)
- La Jolla Cove (San Diego County)
- Laguna Mountains (San Diego County)
- Lake Arrowhead (San Bernardino County)
- Lake Casitas (Ventura County)
- Lake Elsinore (Riverside County)
- Lake Isabella (Kern County)
- Lake Perris (Riverside County)
- Lake Piru (Ventura County)
- Lakeview Mountains (Riverside County)
- Lake Webb (Kern County)
- Little San Bernardino Mountains (Riverside & San Bernardino Counties)
- Little Signal Hills (Kern County)
- Los Angeles Basin (Los Angeles & Orange Counties)
- Los Angeles River (Los Angeles County)
- Los Padres National Forest (Kern, Los Angeles, San Luis Obispo, Santa Barbara, & Ventura Counties)
- Lost Hills (Kern County)
- Low Desert (Imperial, San Diego, Riverside & San Bernardino Counties)
- Mojave Desert (Los Angeles, Kern, Riverside & San Bernardino Counties)
- Mojave River (San Bernardino County)
- Mount San Antonio (Los Angeles County)
- New River (Imperial County, Mexicali Municipality)
- Nine Sisters (San Luis Obispo County)
- Ojai Valley (Ventura County)
- Orange Coast (Orange County)
- Oxnard Plain (Ventura County)
- Palomar Mountain (San Diego County)
- Palo Verde Valley (Riverside & Imperial Counties)
- Palos Verdes Peninsula (Los Angeles County)
- Panamint Range (Inyo County)
- Peninsular Ranges (San Diego, Riverside, & Orange Counties)
- Pleito Hills (Kern County)
- Point Loma (San Diego County)
- Point Mugu (Ventura County)
- Point of Rocks (Kern County)
- Pomona Valley (Los Angeles & San Bernardino Counties)
- Providence Mountains (San Bernardino County)
- Puente Hills (Los Angeles County)
- Pyramid Lake (Los Angeles County)
- Rand Mountains (Kern County)
- Rio Hondo (Los Angeles County)
- Rosamond Hills (Kern County)
- Saddleback Valley (Orange County)
- Salton Sea (Imperial & Riverside Counties)
- San Andreas Fault (All Counties)
- San Bernardino Mountains (San Bernardino County)
- San Bernardino National Forest (Riverside & San Bernardino Counties)
- San Bernardino Valley (San Bernardino County)
- San Diego Bay (San Diego County)
- San Diego River (San Diego County)
- San Emigdio Mountains (Los Angeles, Ventura, & Kern Counties)
- San Fernando Valley (Los Angeles County)
- San Gabriel Mountains (Los Angeles & San Bernardino Counties)
- San Gabriel River (Los Angeles County)
- San Gabriel Valley (Los Angeles County)
- San Jacinto Mountains (Riverside County)
- San Jacinto River (Riverside County)
- San Joaquin Valley (Kern County)
- San Luis Rey River (San Diego County)
- San Pedro Bay (Los Angeles County)
- San Rafael Mountains (Santa Barbara County)
- Santa Ana Mountains (Orange & Riverside Counties)
- Santa Ana River (San Bernardino, Riverside & Orange Counties)
- Santa Ana Valley (Orange County)
- Santa Catalina Island (Los Angeles County)
- Santa Clara River (Ventura County)
- Santa Clara River Valley (Ventura County)
- Santa Clarita Valley (Los Angeles County)
- Santa Margarita River (Riverside, Orange & San Diego Counties)
- Santa Monica Bay (Los Angeles County)
- Santa Monica Mountains (Los Angeles & Ventura Counties)
- Santa Rosa Mountains (Riverside, Imperial & San Diego Counties)
- Santa Susana Mountains (Los Angeles & Ventura Counties)
- Santa Ynez Mountains (Santa Barbara & Ventura Counties)
- Santa Ynez Valley (Santa Barbara County)
- Scodie Mountains (Kern County)
- Sequoia National Forest (Kern County)
- Shale Hills (Kern County)
- Sierra Nevada (Kern County)
- Sierra Pelona Mountains (Los Angeles & Kern Counties)
- Simi Hills (Los Angeles & Ventura Counties)
- Simi Valley (Ventura County)
- Sweetwater River (San Diego County)
- Tehachapi Mountains (Kern & Los Angeles Counties)
- Tejon Hills (Kern County)
- Temescal Mountains (Riverside County)
- Telephone Hills (Kern County)
- Temblor Range (Kern & San Luis Obispo Counties)
- Tijuana River (San Diego County)
- Topatopa Mountains (Ventura County)
- Turtle Mountains (San Bernardino County)
- Ventura River (Ventura County)
- Verdugo Mountains (Los Angeles County)
- Victor Valley (San Bernardino County)

=== Geology ===
==== List of major fault zones ====
Note: Plate boundary faults are indicated with a (#) symbol.

- Brawley Seismic Zone
- Chino Fault
- Elsinore Fault Zone
- Elysian Park Fault
- Garlock Fault
- Hosgri Fault
- Imperial Fault Zone
- Laguna Salada Fault
- Newport–Inglewood Fault
- Peninsular Ranges
- Puente Hills Fault
- Raymond Fault
- Rose Canyon Fault
- Salton Trough
- Salinian Block
- San Andreas Fault #
- San Cayetano Fault
- San Felipe Fault Zone
- San Gabriel Fault
- San Jacinto Fault Zone
- Santa Maria River Fault
- Santa Ynez Fault
- Shoreline Fault
- Ventura Fault
- White Wolf Fault
- Whittier Fault
- Yorba Linda Fault

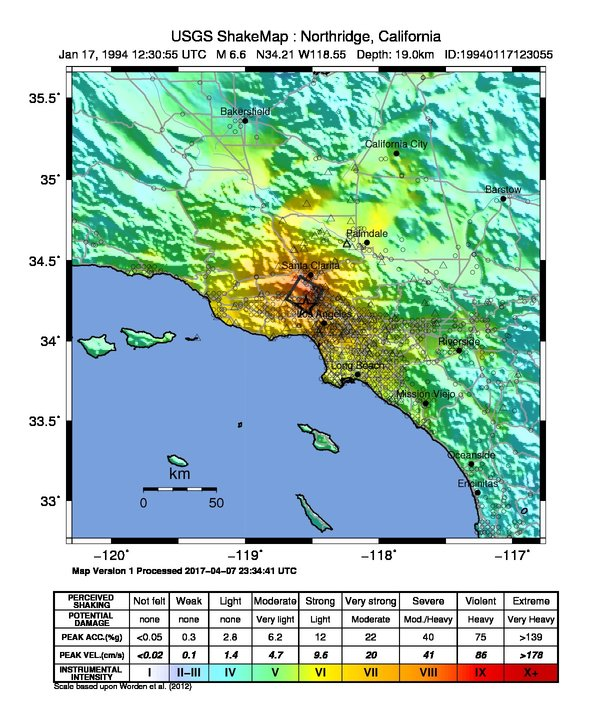
Northridge earthquake shake map

==== Earthquakes ====
Each year, Southern California has about 10,000 earthquakes. Nearly all of them are too small to be felt. Only several hundred have been greater than magnitude (M_{w}) 3.0, and only about 15–20 have been greater than M_{w} 4.0. California as a whole enacted the Alquist Priolo Special Studies Zone Act in the wake of the 1971 San Fernando earthquake. The act prohibits new construction of residential buildings closer than 50 feet (15 m) from a surface rupturing active fault zone. In addition, the act improved safety by requiring new structures (both residential and commercial) to be seismically retrofitted. It also required existing infrastructure to comply.

Since 1972, numerous large magnitude earthquakes have struck Southern California with little widespread damage in part due to the act. However, exceptions can be noted for epicenters that lie directly on top of densely populated regions such as the M_{w} 6.7 1994 Northridge Earthquake and, to a lesser extent, the smaller M_{w} 5.5 2008 Chino Hills earthquake. The Northridge earthquake occurred on a blind-thrust fault directly underneath the San Fernando Valley, which until the earthquake was previously undiscovered. Seismic retrofitting of existing and new construction is aimed to prevent damage and save lives in the aftermath of a major quake, but it cannot guarantee that buildings will be unscathed if the epicenter is relatively close by.

The 1994 Northridge earthquake was particularly destructive, causing a substantial number of deaths, injuries, and structural collapses. The quake caused the most property damage of any earthquake in U.S. history at an estimated $20 billion.

Many Southern California faults are able to produce a M_{w} 6.7 earthquake or greater, such as the San Andreas Fault, which can produce M_{w} 8.0 or greater. The largest known earthquake in California was the 1857 Fort Tejon earthquake that ruptured 200+ miles (320+ kilometers) of the San Andreas Fault from Parkfield to Wrightwood. With a recurrence interval of roughly 150 years, this part of the San Andreas fault is well within its window to produce another large earthquake. Along with the southern section of the San Andreas (in the Palm Springs region, which has not ruptured in ~400 years), the entire Southern California portion of the San Andreas Fault is ready to produce a powerful earthquake in the near future.

Notable faults capable of large magnitude events include the San Jacinto Fault (a splay of the San Andreas that runs directly under the I-10 & I-215 interchange), the Newport–Inglewood-Rose Canyon Fault (located adjacent to SoFi Stadium and responsible for Signal Hill), the Elsinore Fault (created Lake Elsinore), the Garlock Fault (which marks boundary between of the Sierra Nevada and the Mojave Desert), and the Hollywood fault (which is within feet of Capitol Records and is roughly parallel to Hollywood Boulevard).

The United States Geological Survey (USGS) has released a California earthquake forecast, which models earthquake occurrence in California.

===== List of earthquakes =====
This is a partial list of earthquakes in Southern California. For a full list, see List of earthquakes in California.

Note: Earthquakes with epicenters in the Los Angeles Metro Area are marked with the (#) symbol. Other earthquakes mentioned indicates shaking was felt in the region.

- 1812 San Juan Capistrano earthquake #
- 1812 Ventura earthquake
- 1857 Fort Tejon earthquake
- 1892 Laguna Salada earthquake
- 1899 San Jacinto earthquake
- 1918 San Jacinto earthquake
- 1933 Long Beach earthquake #
- 1940 El Centro earthquake
- 1948 Desert Hot Springs earthquake
- 1971 San Fernando earthquake #
- 1979 Imperial Valley earthquake
- 1968 Borrego Mountain earthquake
- 1986 North Palm Springs earthquake
- 1987 Superstition Hills earthquakes
- 1987 Whittier Narrows earthquake #
- 1991 Sierra Madre earthquake #
- 1992 Big Bear earthquake #
- 1992 Landers earthquake
- 1994 Northridge earthquake #
- 2008 Chino Hills earthquake #
- 2010 Baja California earthquake
- 2019 Ridgecrest earthquakes

== Population ==
Historical population
Census	Pop.	Note	%±
1850	6,492		—
1860	33,280		412.6%
1870	44,158		32.7%
1880	91,916		108.2%
1890	251,770		173.9%
1900	337,328		34.0%
1910	808,408		139.7%
1920	1,423,786		76.1%
1930	3,044,978		113.9%
1940	3,840,733		26.1%
1950	5,931,975		54.4%
1960	9,398,722		58.4%
1970	12,103,559		28.8%
1980	14,308,742		18.2%
1990	18,269,095		27.7%
2000	20,637,512		13.0%
2010	22,680,010		9.9%
2020	23,762,904		4.8%
Sources: 1790–1990, 2000, 2010, 2020; Chart does not include Indigenous population figures. Studies indicate that the Native American population in California in 1850 was close to 150,000 before declining to 15,000 by 1900.

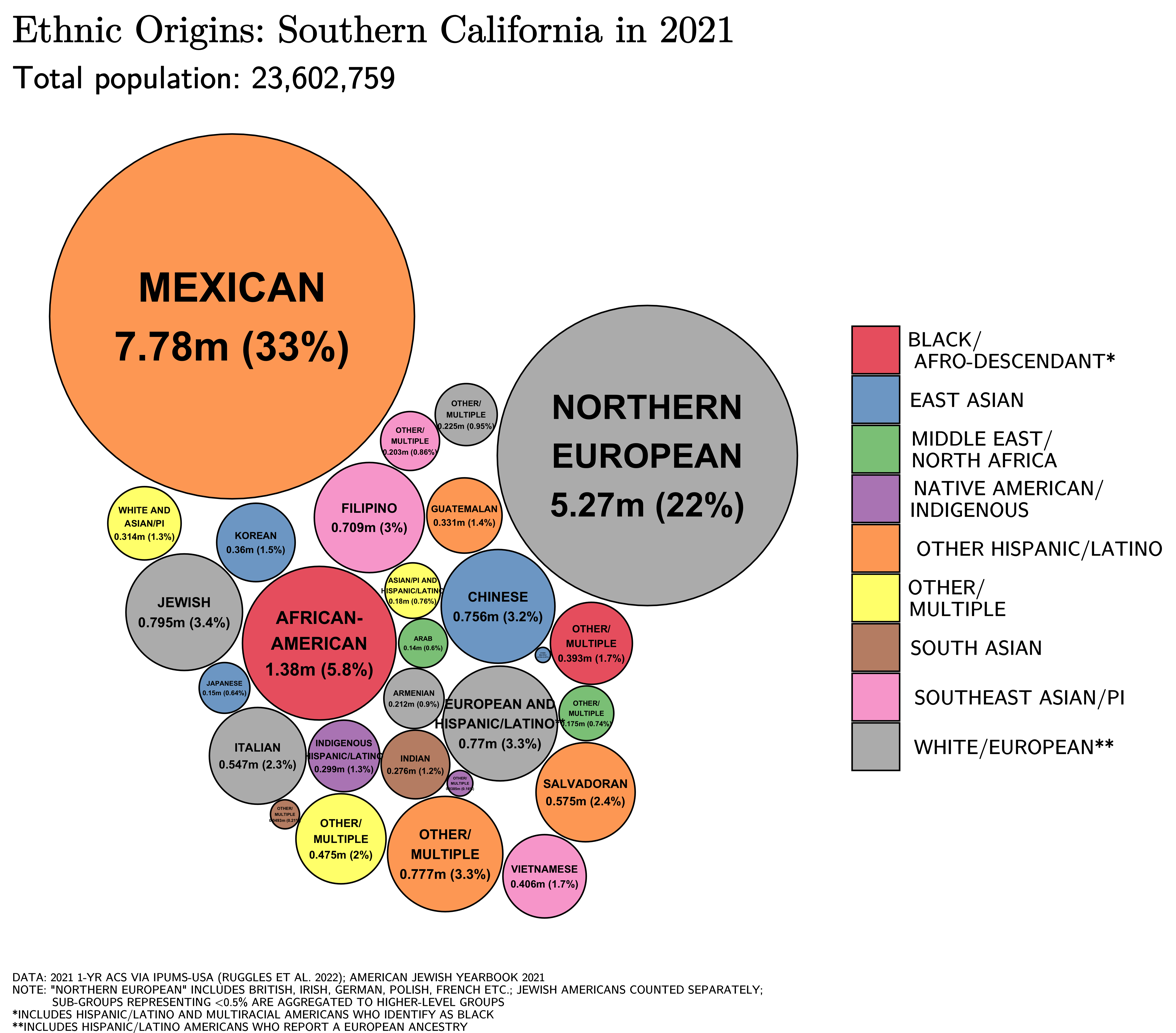
Ethnic origins in Southern California

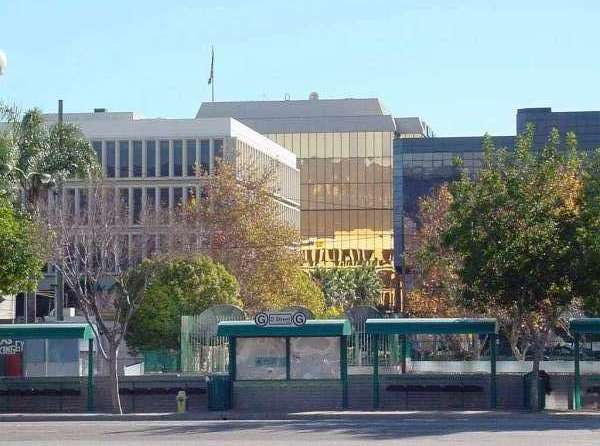
Downtown San Bernardino

As of the 2020 United States census, Southern California has a population of 23,762,904. Despite a reputation for high growth rates, Southern California's population has grown slower than the state average since the 2000s. This is due to California's growth becoming concentrated in the northern part of the state as result of a stronger, tech-oriented economy in the Bay Area and an emerging Greater Sacramento region.

Southern California consists of one Combined Statistical Area, eight Metropolitan Statistical Areas, one international metropolitan area, and multiple metropolitan divisions. The region is home to two extended metropolitan areas that exceed five million in population. These are the Greater Los Angeles Area at 17,786,419, and San Diego–Tijuana at 5,105,768. Of these metropolitan areas, the Los Angeles-Long Beach-Santa Ana metropolitan area, Riverside-San Bernardino-Ontario metropolitan area, and Oxnard-Thousand Oaks-Ventura metropolitan area form Greater Los Angeles; while the El Centro metropolitan area and San Diego-Carlsbad-San Marcos metropolitan area form the Southern Border Region. North of Greater Los Angeles are the Santa Barbara, San Luis Obispo, and Bakersfield metropolitan areas.

=== Cities ===
Los Angeles (with a population of approximately 3.9 million people) and San Diego (at nearly 1.4 million people) are the two largest cities in all of California, and are among the top eight largest cities in the United States. In Southern California, there are also 14 cities with more than 200,000 residents and 48 cities over 100,000 residents. Many of Southern California's most developed cities lie along or in close proximity to the coast, with the exception of San Bernardino and Riverside.

=== Counties ===
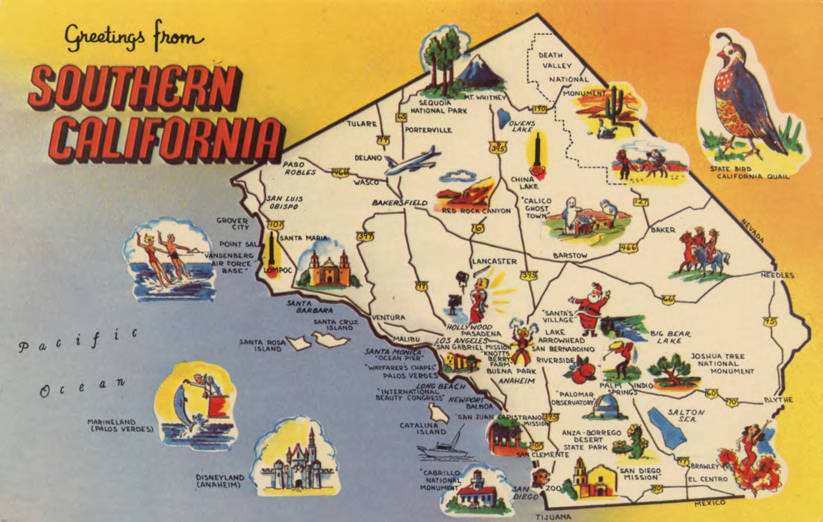
Curt Teich map postcard depicting SoCal attractions

- Imperial
- Kern
- Los Angeles
- Orange
- Riverside
- San Bernardino
- San Diego
- San Luis Obispo
- Santa Barbara
- Ventura

== Economy ==
=== Industries ===
Southern California is one of the largest economies in the United States. It is dominated by, and heavily dependent upon, the abundance of petroleum, as opposed to other regions where automobiles are not nearly as dominant, due to the vast majority of transport that runs on this fuel. Southern California is famous for tourism and the entertainment industry. Other industries include software, automotive, aerospace, finance, biomedical, ports and regional logistics. The region was a leader in the housing bubble from 2001 to 2007, and has been heavily impacted by the housing crash.

Since the 1920s, motion pictures, petroleum, and aircraft manufacturing have been major industries. In one of the richest agricultural regions in the U.S., cattle and citrus were major industries until farmlands were turned into suburbs. Although military spending cutbacks have had an impact, aerospace continues to be a major factor.

=== Major central business districts ===
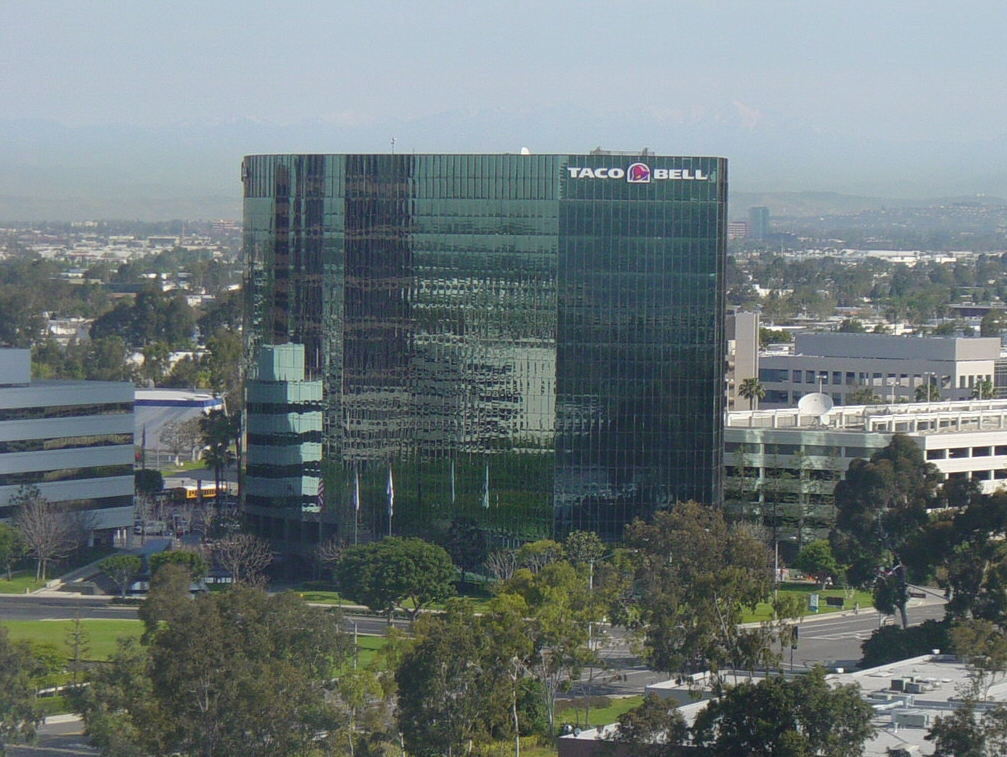
Taco Bell Headquarters in Irvine

Southern California is home to many major business districts. Central business districts (CBD) include Downtown Los Angeles, Downtown Riverside, Downtown San Bernardino, downtown San Diego, and the South Coast Metro. Within the Los Angeles Area are the major business districts of Downtown Pasadena, Downtown Burbank, Downtown Santa Monica, Downtown Glendale and Downtown Long Beach. Los Angeles proper has many business districts, such as Downtown LA and those lining Wilshire Boulevard, including Mid-Wilshire, the Miracle Mile, Downtown Beverly Hills, and Westwood; others include Century City and Warner Center in the San Fernando Valley. The area of Santa Monica and Venice (and perhaps some of Culver City) is informally referred to as "Silicon Beach" because of the concentration of financial and marketing technology-centric firms located in the region.

The San Bernardino-Riverside Area maintains the business districts of Downtown San Bernardino, Hospitality Business/Financial Centre, University District which are in the cities of San Bernardino and Riverside.

In Orange County, has highly developed suburban business centers (also known as edge cities) including the Anaheim–Santa Ana edge city along I-5; and another, the South Coast Plaza–John Wayne Airport edge city that stretches from the South Coast Metro to the Irvine Business Complex; Newport Center; and Irvine Spectrum. Downtown Santa Ana is an important government, arts and entertainment, and retail district.

Downtown San Diego is the CBD of San Diego, though the city is filled with business districts. These include Carmel Valley, Del Mar Heights, Mission Valley, Rancho Bernardo, Sorrento Mesa, and University City. Most of these districts are located in Northern San Diego and some within North County regions.

=== Theme parks and Water parks ===
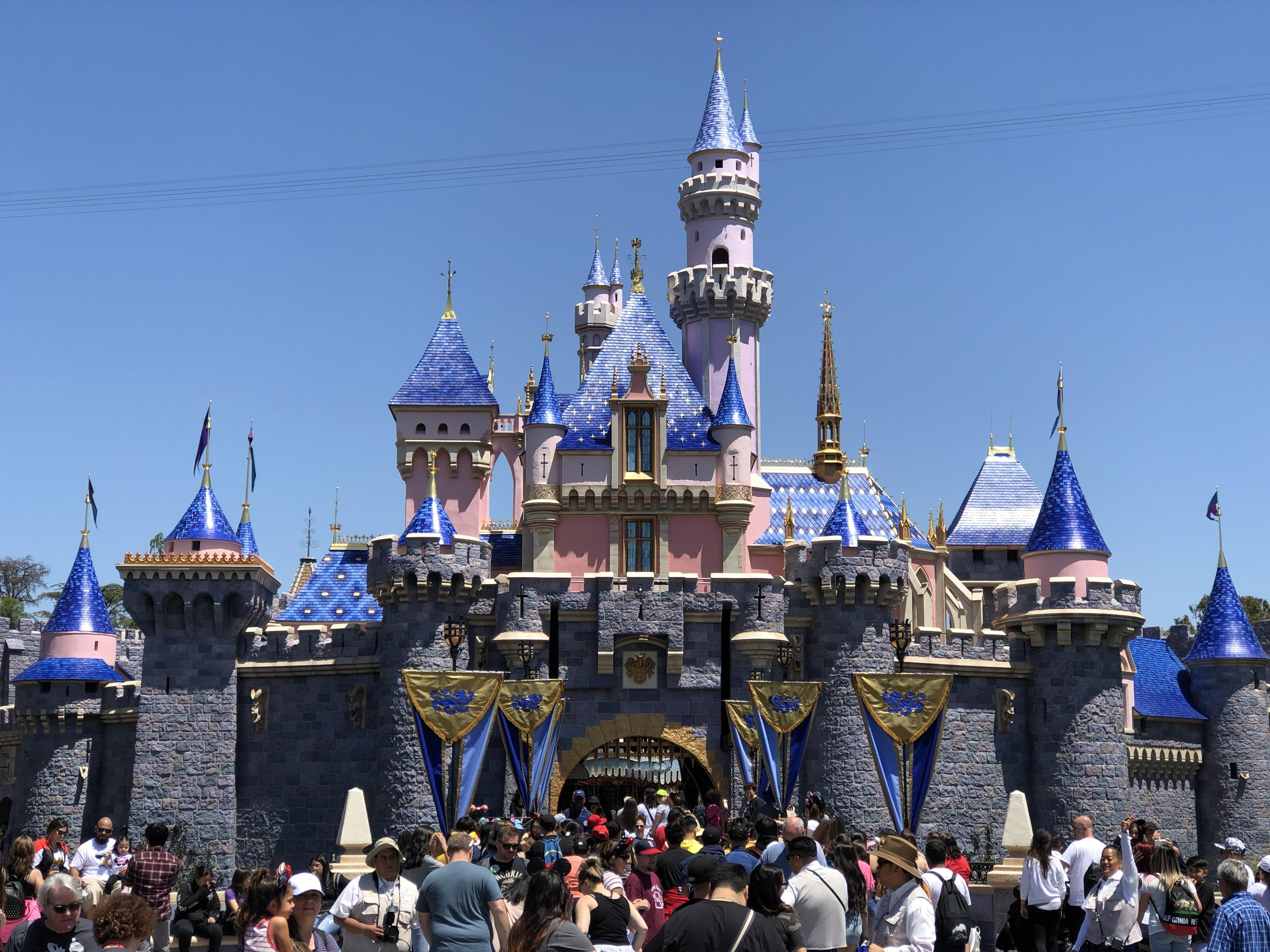
Disneyland in Anaheim

Los Angeles

- Dry Town Water Park
- Pacific Park
- Raging Waters San Dimas
- Six Flags Hurricane Harbor
- Six Flags Magic Mountain
- Universal Studios Hollywood

Orange County

- Adventure City
- Balboa Fun Zone
- Disneyland
- Disney California Adventure
- Knott's Berry Farm
- Knott's Soak City
- Wild Rivers

Riverside & San Bernardino

- Castle Park
- SkyPark at Santa's Village
- Wet'n'Wild Palm Springs

San Diego

- Sesame Place San Diego
- Belmont Park
- Legoland California
- Legoland Waterpark
- San Diego Zoo
- San Diego Zoo Safari Park
- SeaWorld San Diego

=== Vineyard-Winery American Viticultural Area (AVA) districts ===
California wine AVA-American Viticultural Areas in southern California:

- South Coast AVA
  - Cucamonga Valley AVA
  - Malibu-Newton Canyon AVA
  - Ramona Valley AVA
  - Saddle Rock-Malibu AVA
  - Temecula Valley AVA
- Leona Valley AVA
- Central Coast AVA
  - San Luis Obispo Coast AVA
    - Arroyo Grande Valley AVA
    - Edna Valley AVA
  - San Pasqual Valley AVA
  - Santa Maria Valley AVA
  - Santa Ynez Valley AVA
  - Sta. Rita Hills AVA
  - York Mountain AVA

== Transportation ==
Southern California is home to Los Angeles International Airport, the second-busiest airport in the United States by passenger volume (see World's busiest airports by passenger traffic) and the third-busiest by international passenger volume (see Busiest airports in the United States by international passenger traffic); San Diego International Airport, the busiest single-runway airport in the United States; Van Nuys Airport, the world's busiest general aviation airport; major commercial airports at San Bernardino, Orange County, Bakersfield, Ontario, Burbank, and Long Beach; and numerous smaller commercial and general aviation airports.

Six of the seven lines of the commuter rail system, Metrolink, run out of downtown Los Angeles, connecting Los Angeles, Ventura, San Bernardino, Riverside, Orange, and San Diego counties with the other line connecting San Bernardino, Riverside, and Orange counties directly.

Southern California is also home to the Port of Los Angeles, the country's busiest commercial port; the adjacent Port of Long Beach, the country's second busiest container port; and the Port of San Diego.

=== Airports ===
The following table shows all airports listed by the Federal Aviation Association (FAA) as a hub airport:

Airport	ID	City (Metro area)	Category	Enplanements (2011) (mil)
Los Angeles International Airport	LAX	Los Angeles	Large Hub	30.5m
San Diego International Airport	SAN	San Diego	Large Hub	8.5m
John Wayne Airport	SNA	Orange County	Medium Hub	4.2m
Ontario International Airport	ONT	San Bernardino, Riverside	Medium hub	2.3m
Hollywood Burbank Airport	BUR	Burbank (LA)	Medium Hub	2.1m
Long Beach Airport	LGB	Long Beach (LA)	Small Hub	1.5m
Palm Springs International Airport	PSP	Palm Springs	Small Hub	0.8m
Santa Barbara Municipal Airport	SBA	Santa Barbara	Small Hub	0.7m
San Luis Obispo Regional Airport	SBP	San Luis Obispo	Small Hub	0.5m
San Bernardino International Airport	SBD	San Bernardino, Riverside	Small Hub	NA

=== Freeways and highways ===
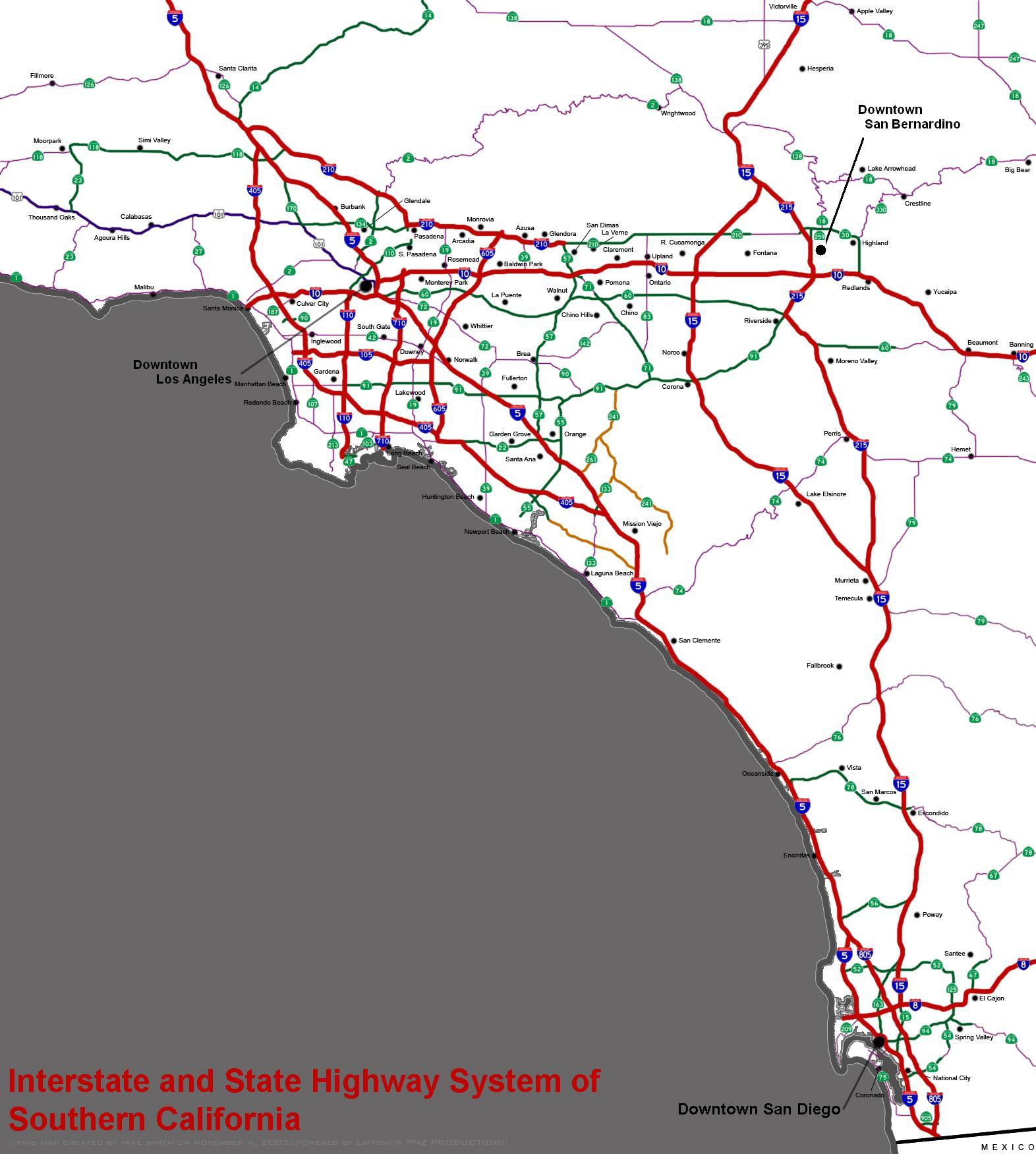
Interstate and state highway system of Southern California

Sections of the Southern California freeway system are often referred to by names rather than by the official numbers.

Interstate Highways
Sign	Interstate	Freeway name
	Interstate 5	Golden State Freeway; Santa Ana Freeway; San Diego Freeway; Montgomery Freeway
	Interstate 8	Ocean Beach Freeway; Mission Valley Freeway
	Interstate 10	Santa Monica (Rosa Parks) Freeway; Golden State Freeway; San Bernardino Freeway; Indio (Dr. June McCarroll) Freeway; Blythe Freeway
	Interstate 15	Mojave Freeway; Barstow Freeway; Ontario Freeway; Corona Freeway; Temecula Valley Freeway; Escondido Freeway
	Interstate 40	Needles Freeway
	Interstate 105	Century (Glenn Anderson) Freeway
	Interstate 110	Harbor Freeway
	Interstate 210	Foothill Freeway
	Interstate 215	Barstow Freeway; San Bernardino Freeway; Moreno Valley Freeway; Escondido Freeway
	Interstate 405	San Diego Freeway
	Interstate 605	San Gabriel River Freeway
	Interstate 710	Long Beach Freeway
	Interstate 805	Jacob Dekema Freeway
	Future Interstate 905	

U.S. Highway system
Sign	U.S. Route	Freeway name
	U.S. Route 66	National Trails Highway; Cajon Boulevard; Foothill Boulevard; Arroyo Seco Parkway; Santa Monica Boulevard
	U.S. Route 95	
	U.S. Route 99	Golden State Highway; Ridge Route
	U.S. Route 101	Ventura Freeway; Hollywood Freeway; Santa Ana Freeway; El Camino Real
	U.S. Route 395	

=== Public transportation ===
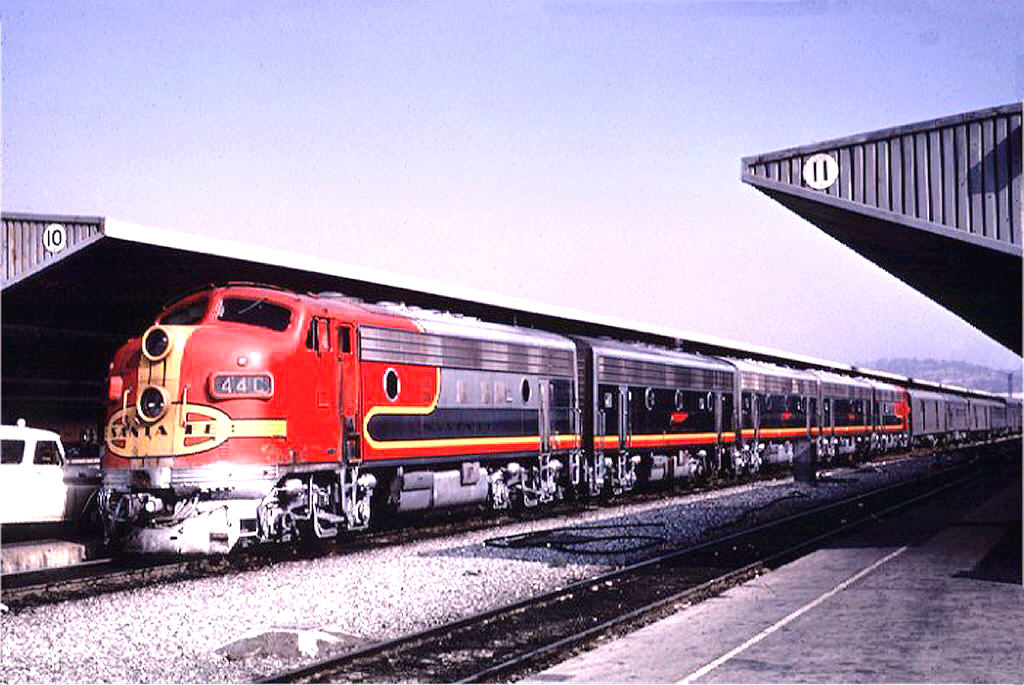
The Atchison, Topeka and Santa Fe Railway's combined Super Chief-El Capitan pulls into Los Angeles's Union Passenger Terminal on September 24, 1966.

- Antelope Valley Transit Authority
- Big Blue Bus (Santa Monica)
- Gold Coast Transit (Ventura County)
- Golden Empire Transit (Bakersfield)
- Los Angeles County Metropolitan Transportation Authority
- Metrolink
- North County Transit District (northern San Diego County)
- Omnitrans (southwestern San Bernardino County)
- Orange County Transportation Authority
- Riverside Transit Agency (western Riverside County)
- Coaster (Oceanside to San Diego)
- San Diego Metropolitan Transit System
- San Luis Obispo Regional Transit Authority
- Santa Barbara Metropolitan Transit District

== Communication ==
=== Telephone area codes ===
- 213 – Central Los Angeles
- 310 – West Los Angeles, Inglewood, Santa Monica, South Bay and Catalina Island
- 323 – Overlay with 213
- 424 – Overlay with 310
- 442 – Overlay with 760
- 562 – Long Beach, Gateway Cities, and parts of northern Orange County
- 619 – most of San Diego County including San Diego
- 626 – most of San Gabriel Valley including Pasadena
- 657 – Overlay with 714
- 661 – Bakersfield, Santa Clarita, and Antelope Valley
- 714 – Northern Orange County (including Anaheim, Santa Ana, and Huntington Beach)
- 760 – Northern San Diego County (including Oceanside and Escondido), Imperial County, Coachella Valley, Blythe, Twentynine Palms, Victor Valley, Barstow, and Ridgecrest
- 805 – Santa Barbara, Ventura and San Luis Obispo Counties
- 818 – Eastern Conejo Valley, Crescenta Valley, San Fernando Valley including Glendale and Burbank
- 820 – Overlay with 805
- 840 – Overlay with 909
- 858 – Overlay with 619
- 909 – Southwestern San Bernardino County, eastern Los Angeles County, and portions of northwestern Riverside County
- 949 – Southern Orange County (including Irvine, Newport Beach, Laguna Niguel, and San Clemente)
- 951 – Western Riverside County including Riverside and Temecula

== Colleges and universities ==
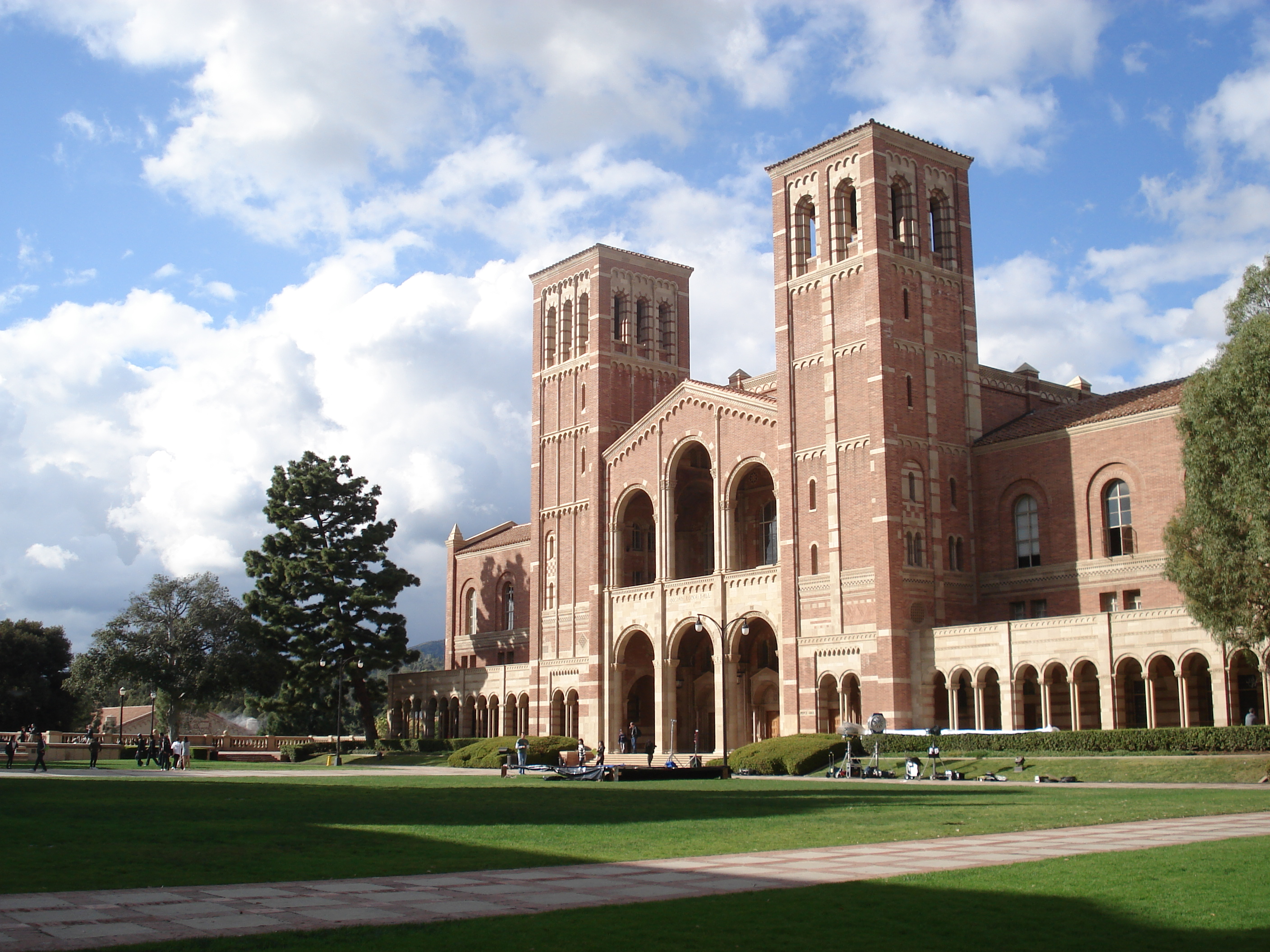
University of California, Los Angeles

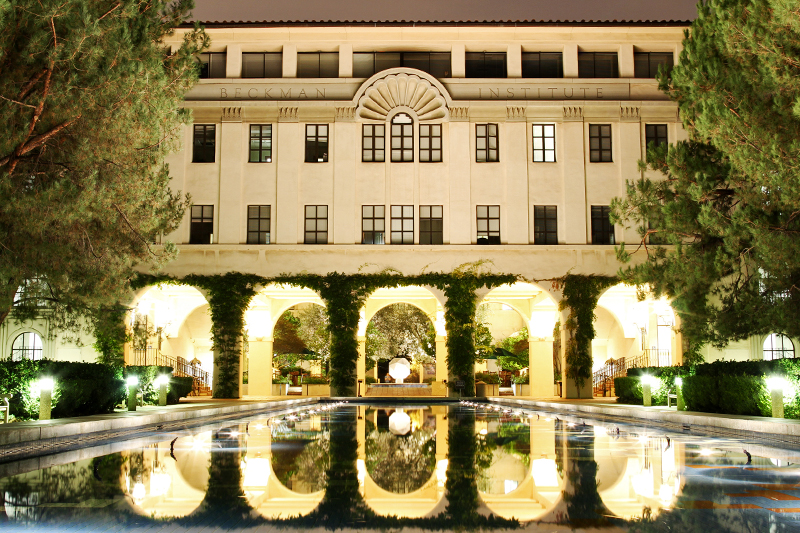
California Institute of Technology

Public institutions in the region include:

University of California (10 campuses total; 5 within the SoCal region)

- Irvine
- Los Angeles
- Riverside
- Santa Barbara
- San Diego

California State University (23 campuses total; 12 within the SoCal region)

- Bakersfield
- Channel Islands
- Dominguez Hills
- Fullerton
- Los Angeles
- Long Beach
- Northridge
- Pomona
- San Bernardino
- San Diego
- San Marcos
- San Luis Obispo

Private institutions include:

- California Institute of Technology (Pasadena)
- California Baptist University (Riverside)
- Azusa Pacific University (Azusa)
- Chapman University (Orange)
- Claremont Colleges (all in Claremont)
  - Claremont McKenna College
  - Harvey Mudd College
  - Pitzer College
  - Pomona College
  - Scripps College
  - Claremont Graduate University
  - Keck Graduate Institute
- Loma Linda University (Loma Linda)
- Loyola Marymount University (Los Angeles)
- Occidental College (Los Angeles)
- Pepperdine University (Los Angeles)
- University of Redlands (Redlands)
- University of San Diego
- University of Southern California (Los Angeles)

== Parks and recreation areas ==
Numerous parks provide recreation opportunities and open space. Locations include:

- National Park Service
  - Cabrillo National Monument
  - Carrizo Plain National Monument
  - Castle Mountains National Monument
  - Cesar E. Chavez National Monument
  - Channel Islands National Park
  - Death Valley National Park
  - Joshua Tree National Park
  - Mojave National Preserve
  - Santa Monica Mountains National Recreation Area
- Major State Parks – including:
  - Anza-Borrego Desert State Park
  - Crystal Cove State Park
  - Cuyamaca Rancho State Park
  - Chino Hills State Park
  - Fort Tejon State Historic Park
  - Kenneth Hahn State Recreation Area
  - Mount San Jacinto State Park
  - Malibu Creek State Park
  - Red Rock Canyon State Park (California)
  - Topanga State Park
- Major State Historic Parks – including:
  - California Citrus State Historic Park
  - El Presidio de Santa Barbara State Historic Park
  - La Purísima Mission State Historic Park
  - Los Encinos State Historic Park
  - Mission San Luis Obispo de Tolosa
  - Old Town San Diego State Historic Park
  - Rancho Los Encinos
  - Santa Susana Pass State Historic Park
  - Tule Elk State Natural Reserve
  - Watts Towers
  - Will Rogers State Historic Park

== Sports ==
Major professional sports teams in Southern California include:

Club	Sport	League	Venue	Established	Championships
Los Angeles Dodgers	Baseball	Major League Baseball	Dodger Stadium	1883	8
Los Angeles Angels	Baseball	Major League Baseball	Angel Stadium	1961	1
San Diego Padres	Baseball	Major League Baseball	Petco Park	1969	0
Anaheim Ducks	Ice hockey	National Hockey League	Honda Center	1993	1
Los Angeles Kings	Ice hockey	National Hockey League	Crypto.com Arena	1967	2
Los Angeles Sparks	Basketball	Women's National Basketball Association	Crypto.com Arena	1997	3
Los Angeles Lakers	Basketball	National Basketball Association	Crypto.com Arena	1947	12
Los Angeles Clippers	Basketball	National Basketball Association	Intuit Dome	1985	
Angel City FC	Soccer	National Women's Soccer League			
San Diego Wave FC	Soccer	National Women's Soccer League			

Southern California also is home to a number of popular NCAA sports programs such as the UCLA Bruins, the USC Trojans, and the San Diego State Aztecs. The Bruins and the Trojans both field football teams in NCAA Division I in the Big Ten Conference, and there is a longtime rivalry between the schools.

== See also ==
- Category: History of Southern California
- Category:Ranchos of California – Southern California Counties categories
- Category: Public transportation in Southern California
- California earthquake forecast
- California megapolitan areas
- Geography of Southern California
- Largest cities in Southern California
- List of regions of California#Southern California
- Megaregions of the United States
- San Angeles
- South Coast
- Southern California Association of Governments
