= 1812 earthquake =

1812 earthquake may refer to:

- 1812 Caracas earthquake (Venezuela)
- 1811–1812 New Madrid earthquakes (Mississippi River, US) (river tsunamis)
- 1812 San Juan Capistrano earthquake (California, US), also known as the Wrightwood earthquake
- 1812 Ventura earthquake (California, US), also known as the Mission San Buenaventura or Santa Barbara earthquake

== See also ==
- List of historical earthquakes
