= San Cayetano Fault =

Seismic fault in California

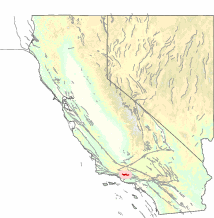
The San Cayetano Fault in Southern California, United States

The San Cayetano Fault is an east–west trending thrust fault in Ventura County, Southern California. It stretches for 45 kilometers (28 mi), north of the city of Ventura, near the Topatopa Mountains, Piru, Fillmore, Santa Paula, Sulphur Springs, and Ojai.

== Geology ==
The last known surface rupture was less than 5,000 years ago. Recent research indicates that the San Cayetano fault may have been the source of the December 21, 1812 earthquake.

Depending on location, the fault has an estimated slip rate between 1.3–9 millimeters (0.051–0.354 in). The recurrence rate between events is uncertain, but if the fault is associated with the 1812 event, it may be able to produce earthquakes approaching 6.5 – 7.3 in magnitude.
