= 1812 Ventura earthquake =

Earthquake in present-day California

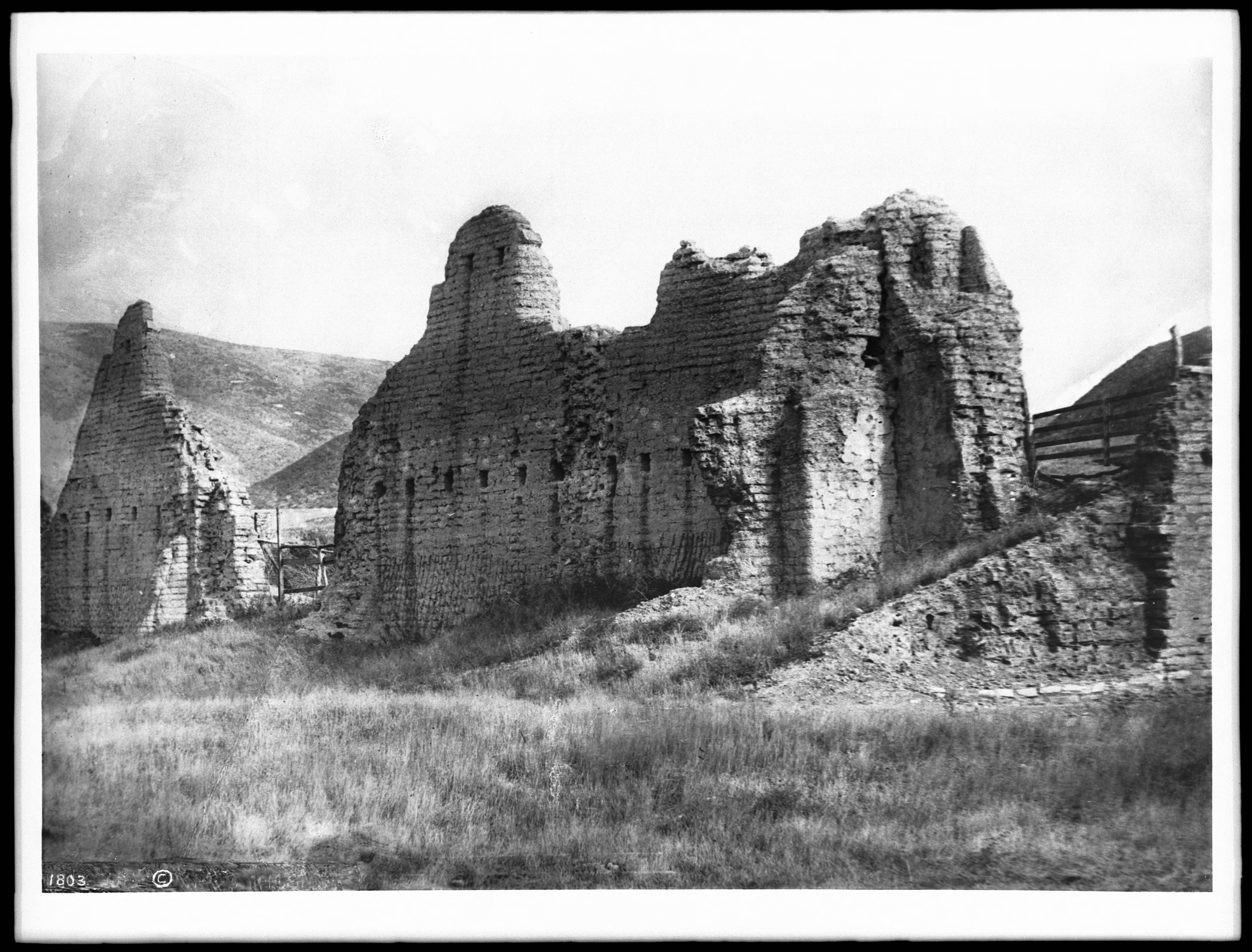
- The ruins of Mission La Purisima Concepcion

- USGS-ANSS: ComCat
- Local date: December 21, 1812
- Local time: 11:00 PST
- Magnitude: M_{w} 7.0–7.5
- Epicenter: 34.2°N 119.9°W (Note: Although this figure is commonly cited, it is possible the earthquake occurred on an inland fault)
- Areas affected: California
- Max. intensity: MMI VIII (Severe)
- Tsunami: Yes
- Aftershocks: Yes
- Casualties: 1 dead

The 1812 Ventura earthquake (also known as the Santa Barbara earthquake) occurred on December 21 at 11:00 PST, affecting present-day southern California. It caused severe damage to many buildings and Spanish missions in the Santa Barbara and Ventura areas. One person was killed and several were injured; further casualties were avoided because residents were alerted and fled buildings after a foreshock occurred 15 minutes prior. Survivors reported a tsunami along the coast and a possible report also came from Hawaii. The tsunami also carried a brig anchored near Gaviota Pass half a mile inland before bringing it out to sea. This earthquake occurred 13 days after the December 8 San Juan Capistrano earthquake.

The source of the earthquake is debated among geologists between the San Andreas Fault or a fault in or near the Santa Barbara Channel, like the San Cayetano Fault. At an excavation site along the San Cayetano Fault, radiocarbon dating constrained the date of a surface rupturing earthquake to between 1660 and before the late 19th century with preference at the end of the time window, coinciding with the December 21 earthquake, making it a possible source fault. Estimates of the magnitude range from M_{w} 7.0–7.5 based on measured thrust slip of 14–17 ft (4.3–5.2 m) at the site.

== Earthquake ==
=== San Andreas Fault ===
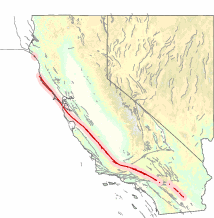
The San Andreas Fault in California

In a 2002 Bulletin of the Seismological Society of America (BSSA) article, researchers suggests the December 21 earthquake may have been caused by a westward-propagating rupture on the San Andreas Fault triggered by the December 8 event. Developing on earlier research from 1988, they postulated that both earthquakes occurred on two halves of a 105.6 mi (170 km) fault rupture. (Note: Authors of the 1988 research do not support rupture on the San Andreas Fault during the December 21 event) The December 8 event ruptured 62 mi (100 km) of the eastern segment while the December 21 event ruptured the western segment for 43.5 mi (70.0 km). Based on the rupture length, researchers estimated a moment magnitude of 7.0 to 7.2. As for reports of a tsunami along the Santa Barbara coast, it was possibly triggered by a large submarine landslide in the Santa Barbara Channel. The Mojave segment would re-rupture during the 1857 Fort Tejon earthquake, overlapping the 1812 rupture zones, and representing the central and southern part of the 1857 rupture.

The 1988 report under Science used dendrochronology to provide evidence of coseismic rupture on the San Andreas Fault during the December 8 event rather than the one on December 21. Nine trees within 66 ft (20 m) of the San Andreas Fault near Wrightwood showed severe long-term growth stunt from 1813 onwards with some taking more than 50 years to recover. Two trees exhibited complete crown loss while another experienced partial loss. Drought was ruled out as a cause because it usually causes stunts lasting a year whereas the stunt at the sampled trees continued for several decades. The selective and spatially tight distribution of tree damage also eliminated lightning, strong winds, ice storms, fire, diseases or pest infestation as possible causes. The 1812 growth rings were complete and did not show trauma, but growth rings from 1813 exhibited the growth stunt; this suggested the event occurred after the growing season ended, usually in September, and before the next growing season, in March or April of 1813.

A plausible cause was narrowed to root systems severed by the right-lateral strike-slip motion on the San Andreas Fault and related ground warping. The severed roots greatly reduced the trees' ability to intake water and nutrients until new roots formed decades later. They estimated that the December 8 event ruptured a 105.6 mi (170 km) section of the fault extending southeastwards from Tejon Pass.

The authors argued against a San Andreas rupture for the December 21 earthquake. First, aftershocks were felt locally in Santa Barbara suggesting a nearby coastal fault was responsible. Second is the lack of damage at Santa Barbara during the much larger 1857 earthquake despite slip on a section of the fault close to the city.

=== San Cayetano Fault ===
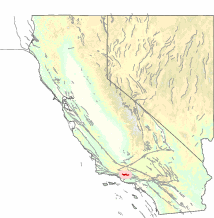
The San Cayetano Fault in Southern California

In another BSSA article, geologists conducted a paleoseismic study along the San Cayetano Fault and found evidence of recent surface ruptures that could correspond with the earthquake.

Located northwest of Los Angeles, the San Cayetano Fault is a 25 mi (40 km) long east–west striking, north-dipping reverse fault comprising eastern and western lobe-shaped segments. It actively accommodates north–south crustal shortening of the Ventura Basin with its extension along the basin's northern margin. At the southern basin margin, the south-dipping Oak Ridge Fault also accommodates this deformation. The fault's western lobe ends just east of Ojai, while at Fillmore, a 2.5 mi (4.0 km) wide geometric step breaks the fault into two segments. The eastern segment runs just west of Piru before terminating several kilometers to its east. With an average slip rate of 0.29 ± 0.12 in (7.4 ± 3.0 mm) per year, the San Cayetano Fault, particularly its eastern lobe, is one of the fastest-slipping reverse faults in southern California. Due to its high slip rate, it was identified as one of six fault zones in Greater Los Angeles that can potentially cause a magnitude 7.2 or larger earthquake.

The trenching site was on a segment of the fault about 1.2 mi (1.9 km) west–southwest of Piru. It cuts through a fault scarp in an active alluvial zone, revealing 14 ft (4.3 m), and potentially up to 17 ft (5.2 m) of reverse slip that formed during a large earthquake. Radiocarbon dating of detritus charcoal constrained the date of this event to no earlier than 1660 while the lack of topsoil also capped the upper-bound range at 1813, consistent with the December 21 earthquake. Empirical scaling relationships between slip and magnitude indicate that such a displacement corresponds to an earthquake larger than M_{w} 7.0 and possibly approaching M_{w} 7.5. Because two shocks were reported within 15 minutes, the rupture may have been multi-segmented, breaking across geometric boundaries separating both segments.

=== Stress triggering ===
A 1981 United States Geological Survey report suggested that an earthquake in the Santa Barbara Channel, about 6.2–12.4 mi (10.0–20.0 km) southwest of the location of the 1925 Santa Barbara earthquake, could explain the damage. An epicenter in the channel has been generally assumed for this earthquake. (Note: 34.2°N 119.9°W) (Note: These coordinates are adopted by the infobox map) Reports of a tsunami would suggest the earthquake was caused by thrust faulting, similar to the 1978 Santa Barbara earthquake which was caused by left-lateral and thrust slip on a north-dipping fault, but that would require a M_{w} 7.7 earthquake which is unsupported by the relatively small area where Modified Mercalli intensity VII shaking was observed.

In a 1996 Geophysical Research Letters article, researchers modelled a Coulomb stress scenario for the December 8 earthquake along the Mojave segment of the San Andreas Fault terminating at Pallett Creek. The model calculated positive Coulomb stress increase in faults in the adjacent Santa Barbara and Ventura areas, especially on shallow-dipping thrust and oblique-thrust, or northwest-trending faults. Thus, they concluded that the Mojave rupture may have promoted, advanced by several years to decades, and triggered the December 21 earthquake. These stress changes brought faults that were already highly stressed closer to rupturing, hence the December 21 shock was likely triggered by the earlier event on a highly strained fault. They also modelled a scenario earthquake on the Coachella Valley and San Bernardino segments and found that it promoted stress on shallow-dipping thrust faults and northwest-trending right-lateral strike-slip faults beneath Greater Los Angeles. The San Cayetano Fault was also located in the area of increased stress, as were the faults in the channel, though to a lesser extent.

== Tsunami ==
Reports of a tsunami only appeared in written records "many years" after the event and were based on survivors' memory. The tsunami, which affected at least 55 mi (89 km) of the coast between Santa Barbara and Ventura, was likely triggered by a submarine landslide in the channel. Its wave amplitude was estimated at 8.5 ft (2.6 m) in Gaviota, and 3 ft (0.91 m) in Santa Barbara and Ventura. The tsunami had run-ups as high as 13 ft (4.0 m) at El Refugio, about 40 km (25 mi) west of Santa Barbara, compared to 6.7 ft (2.0 m) at Santa Barbara and Ventura. At Santa Barbara, the tsunami may have inundated the San Miguel Chapel which was situated 15 ft (4.6 m) above sea level. The waves carried the Charon, an illegal fur-trading brig anchored offshore near Gaviota Pass, about half a mile inland before bringing it back to the sea. A possible 6–14 ft (1.8–4.3 m) run-up was reported at Hoʻokena in Kona, Hawaii. (Note: Doak Cox estimated the timing of the event to between December 18 and 23 according to independent analysis of contemporary diaries and "information on the Hawaiian calendar and religious practice") Wave height reports of 50 ft (15 m) at Gaviota, 30–35 ft (9.1–10.7 m) at Santa Barbara, and over 10 ft (3.0 m) at Ventura are likely exaggerated.

== Impact ==
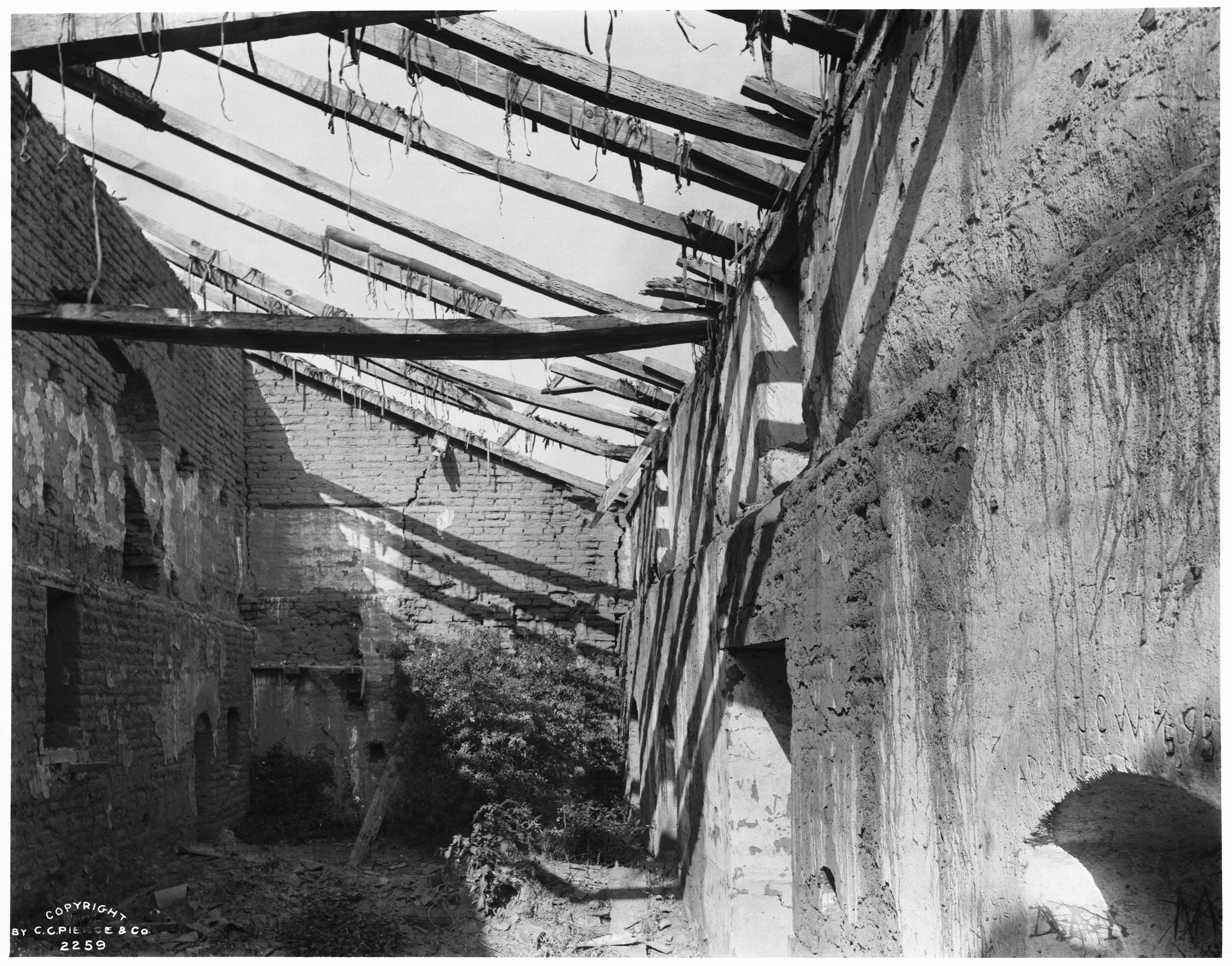
Interior ruins of the chapel at Mission La Purisima

Two shocks were reported; the foreshock occurred 15 minutes before the mainshock at 11:00 (however Coffman and others put the time of the foreshock at 10:30) was credited with preventing further casualties as it frightened many people who eventually fled from buildings. One person was killed and several in Purisima were injured. The mainshock was assigned a maximum Modified Mercalli intensity of VIII (Severe).

Every building of Mission Santa Barbara and the fort were cracked, and a chapel was destroyed. All the buildings in the Presidio of Santa Barbara were uninhabitable. At Purisima, a church collapsed while all of the 100 Indian homes made of adobe and tiles were collapsed or were cracked. Several buildings in Lompoc were "flattened to the ground" while the church at Mission La Purisima was heavily damaged. The damage in Mission Santa Inés was less severe compared to those at Missions Santa Barbara and La Purisima, though many homes were destroyed and a church partially collapsed. Some building damage was also reported in Mission San Buenaventura and Mission San Fernando. Thirty reinforcement beams braced the walls of Mission San Fernando against collapse.

Due to fears of a tsunami, the residents of Ventura relocated 1–2 mi (1.6–3.2 km) inland until the following April. The Chumash people on Santa Rosa Island also relocated after the tsunami. Severe aftershocks were reported through February and weaker ones felt through April.

== See also ==
- 1927 Lompoc earthquake
- List of earthquakes in California
- List of earthquakes in the United States
