= Doak Cox =

Hawaiian geologist (1917–2003)

- Born: Doak C. Cox; 1917; Wailuku, Hawaii
- Died: April 21, 2003 (aged 85–86)
- Education: University of Hawaiʻi (BS); Harvard University
- Occupation: Geologist
- Known for: Work in the prediction of tsunamis
- Scientific career
- Fields: Geology

Doak C. Cox (1917-April 21, 2003) was a Hawaiian geologist, best known for work in the prediction of tsunamis.

== Early life and education ==
Cox was born in Wailuku on the Hawaiian island of Maui, but spent most of his childhood on Kauai. His father, Joel B. Cox, was a civil engineer working for a sugar plantation. In 1938 Cox graduated from the University of Hawaii with a B.S. degree in Physics and Mathematics. He earned his Master's degree in Geology from Harvard University in 1941.

== Career ==
Cox spent the next four years working with the U.S. Geological Survey. After World War II, his career path lead him to accomplishing a good deal of research in hydrogeology, earthquake and tsunami research, and the environment. In 1946 he returned home to work for the Hawaiian Sugar Planters Association (HSPA). At HSPA, he was put in charge of the water development and research program of water and geology. For the next 14 years, Cox worked on Arno Atoll, Western Samoa, the Marshall Islands and the Marianas. He was the first to define the sigmoidal mixing curve in a fresh water lens, which he discovered by using a series of sampling tubes.

Cox was good at recognizing needs that could be taken care of by science. After the 1946 Aleutian Islands earthquake created a destructive tsunami, he wanted to make a wave-based warning system for tsunamis. He wanted to know the height and velocity of quake-generated waves, what time they would arrive, what direction they would come from, and what the destruction impact may be. In 1946, 1952, 1957, 1960, and 1964 Cox gathered data from tsunamis that struck Hawaii. His data later became are part of today's Pacific Tsunami warning system. In the early 1960s, Cox became a professor of geology at the University of Hawaii, remaining in that position until 1985.

In 2002, Cox received a lifetime achievement award from the Hawaii Academy of Science for his contributions to science and education. Cox died of cancer on April 21, 2003.

== Selected bibliography ==
- "Hydrogeology of Arno Atoll, Marshall Islands". Atoll Research Bulletin. 8. 1951.
- "Investigations of tsunami hydrodynamics". Hawaii Institute of Geophysics. 43. 1962.
