= 1812 San Juan Capistrano earthquake =

Earthquake affecting Alta California

- UTC time: 1812-12-08 15:00:00
- USGS-ANSS: ComCat
- Local date: December 8, 1812
- Local time: 07:00
- Magnitude: 6.9 M_{la} 7.5 M_{w}
- Epicenter: Wrightwood; 34.468°N 117.735°W
- Fault: San Andreas Fault and San Jacinto Fault
- Type: Strike-slip
- Areas affected: Alta California; New Spain
- Total damage: Moderate
- Max. intensity: MMI IX (Violent)
- Casualties: 40 killed

The 1812 San Juan Capistrano earthquake, also known simply as the Capistrano earthquake or the Wrightwood earthquake, occurred on December 8 at 15:00 UTC (07:00 a.m. local time) in Alta California. At the time, this was a colonial territory of the Spanish Empire. Damage occurred at several of the missions in the region of Pueblo de Los Ángeles, including Mission San Gabriel Arcángel and Mission San Juan Capistrano, where 40 parishioners were killed during the collapse of a church at an early morning service. Tree-ring and paleoseismic evidence show that there is a strong likelihood that the earthquake originated along the Mojave segment of the San Andreas Fault near Wrightwood, but other faults have been suggested as the cause.

Several studies in the 1980s placed the shock along the southern Newport–Inglewood Fault near the zone of highest reported intensity. This fault is near the coast and the most significant damage at the missions, but later work at trench sites along the San Andreas Fault excluded it for this large-to-very-large shock. Dynamic rupture modelling enabled another proposal in the 2010s involving a dual-rupture scenario with both the San Andreas and San Jacinto Fault Zones. Each of these studies worked with limited data, and the effects of the shock and various fault rupture details led to Mercalli intensities of VII (Very strong) to IX (Violent) being proposed. Magnitudes from 6.9 M_{la} on the low end to 7.5 M_{w} on the high end were also presented.

== Tectonic setting ==
The primary tectonic feature in California is the strike-slip San Andreas (SAF) system of faults that form part of the diffuse Pacific–North American plate boundary. This transform fault trends south-southeast through much of northern and central California, but turns more southeasterly at the southern end of the California Coast Ranges at a prominent restraining bend. Southeast of this bend, the SAF borders the Mojave Desert, then bisects the San Gabriel and San Bernardino Mountains at Cajon Pass, where the active San Jacinto Fault Zone diverges from the SAF. The San Jacinto Mountains and the Salton Sea lie between the two faults as they continue to the southeast towards the Mexico–United States border. The Newport–Inglewood Fault, a part of the San Andreas system that is positioned near the coast along the western extremity of the Los Angeles Basin, is a discontinuous strike-slip fault similar to the San Jacinto Fault.

== Earthquake ==
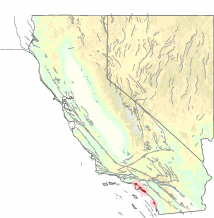
The Newport-Inglewood-Rose Canyon Fault Zone

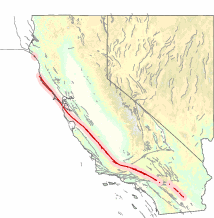
The San Andreas Fault

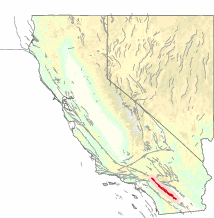
The San Jacinto Fault Zone

=== Source fault ===
In the 1980s several seismologists attributed the source of the event to the southern Newport–Inglewood Fault due to its proximity to the zone of greatest damage at Mission San Juan Capistrano. The northern portion of the fault was excluded as a potential source due to a lack of damage at Mission San Buenaventura. Other more distant sources have also been proposed, including the Mojave segment of the SAF to the north of San Juan Capistrano, substantiated by tree-distress evidence preserved in tree rings along the fault zone and paleoseismic evidence in an investigative trench at Pallet Creek. Another scenario was proposed after a researcher noted the great distance between the SAF and the zone of damage near the coast. After a paleoseismic investigation and simulations, it was proposed that a joint rupture of both the SAF and the San Jacinto Fault Zone to the southeast more closely matched the damage pattern than a SAF-only rupture.

==== Newport–Inglewood Fault ====
In support of the southern Newport–Inglewood Fault as the source, Toppozada & Real 1981 presented a simple isoseismal map with one elongated ring oriented northwest–southeast roughly parallel to the coastline and centered on the fault. The single isoseismal (a line depicting an area of equal intensity) shows the intensity VII (Very strong) boundary for the event, which is an ellipse that includes Mission San Juan Capistrano, Mission San Gabriel Arcángel, and Mission San Fernando Rey de España at the extreme northwest end. From a modern-day perspective, this intensity level covers all of Orange County, most of southern Los Angeles County, and insignificant portions of San Bernardino, Riverside, and San Diego Counties. After analyzing the intensity data that were derived from the mission's minimal reports and by modeling ground conditions and known faults, Evernden & Thompson 1985 also singled out the southern Newport–Inglewood Fault as the source.

==== San Andreas Fault ====
Influenced by the work of several dendrochronologists and a seismologist who examined trauma to trees near Wrightwood, Toppozada et al. 2002 came about in support of the SAF as the source. Jacoby, Sheppard, & Sieh 1988 gained a more thorough understanding of the most recent events and a potential rupture length of the SAF by investigating damage to trees, which been associated with intensity VIII (Severe) shaking within several kilometers of a source fault. Seventy trees were examined, and nine of the trees along a 7.5-mile (12 km) section were found to have experienced some form of trauma beginning in 1813, including two with crown loss. All were within 66 ft (20 m) of the fault. Other sources for the damage were ruled out, including disease, lightning, wind, and fire. Severe shaking was also excluded because trees outside of this narrow zone would also have similar effects. The researchers' theory was that right-lateral displacement on the SAF had damaged their root systems.

==== San Andreas and San Jacinto Faults ====
By the 2010s, the shift of attention from the Newport–Inglewood Fault to the SAF was cemented, with numerous other paleoseismic investigations validating that slip along the SAF, possibly as far north as Elizabeth Lake, was responsible for the event.

=== Damage ===
Several of the Roman Catholic missions in the area experienced heavy damage. The bell structure at Mission San Gabriel Arcángel collapsed, and at Mission San Juan Capistrano the Great Stone Church was destroyed and forty Native Americans were killed as the earthquake happened during the first service. The service was being held on a Tuesday, for the Feast of the Immaculate Conception celebration, which is universally celebrated every December 8.

=== Intensity ===
Toppozada & Real 1981 shows the most conservative estimates for the intensity of the event, with Mission San Luis Rey and Mission San Diego both indicating only that the shock was felt, and no clarification of whether it was weak, light, or moderate. Well away from the proposed epicenter, the San Bernardino Valley may have experienced intensity VI (Strong) shaking, and a maximum intensity of VII was listed for Mission San Juan Capistrano, Mission San Gabriel Arcángel, and Mission San Fernando Rey de España. Mission San Buenaventura lay outside the ring, but is annotated with possibly also having experienced intensity VII effects. Stover & Coffman 1993 and the National Geophysical Data Center's Significant Earthquake Database both show a maximum intensity of VIII (Severe), but neither correlates intensity to location. The NGDC's Earthquake Intensity Database indicates that a maximum of IX (Violent) was experienced at San Gabriel and San Juan Capistrano.

== Other events ==
Thirteen days later, the Ventura earthquake struck with an estimated magnitude of 7.1–7.5. It generated a 3.4-meter (11 ft) tsunami around the Santa Barbara coast. The damage from that was moderate and significantly less deadly. That quake may have been triggered by the Wrightwood earthquake; however, the location of its epicenter remains uncertain.

== See also ==
- List of earthquakes in California
- List of historical earthquakes
- 1812 Ventura earthquake
