= Incremental dynamic analysis =

Incremental dynamic analysis (IDA) is a computational analysis method of earthquake engineering for performing a comprehensive assessment of the behavior of structures under seismic loads. It has been developed to build upon the results of probabilistic seismic hazard analysis in order to estimate the seismic risk faced by a given structure. It can be considered to be the dynamic equivalent of the static pushover analysis.

== Description ==
IDA involves performing multiple nonlinear dynamic analyses of a structural model under a suite of ground motion records, each scaled to several levels of seismic intensity. The scaling levels are appropriately selected to force the structure through the entire range of behavior, from elastic to inelastic and finally to global dynamic instability, where the structure essentially experiences collapse. Appropriate postprocessing can present the results in terms of IDA curves, one for each ground motion record, of the seismic intensity, typically represented by a scalar Intensity Measure (IM), versus the structural response, as measured by an engineering demand parameter (EDP).

Possible choices for the IM are scalar (or rarely vector) quantities that relate to the severity of the recorded ground motion and scale linearly or nonlinearly with its amplitude. The IM is properly chosen well so that appropriate hazard maps (hazard curves) can be produced for them by probabilistic seismic hazard analysis. In addition, the IM should be correlated with the structural response of interest to decrease the number of required response history analyses. Possible choices are the peak ground acceleration, peak ground velocity or Arias intensity, but the most widely used is the 5%-damped spectral acceleration at the first-mode period of the structure. The results of the recent studies show that spectrum intensity (SI) is an appropriate IM.

The EDP can be any structural response quantity that relates to structural, non-structural or contents' damage. Typical choices are the maximum (over all stories and time) interstory drift, the individual peak story drifts and the peak floor accelerations.

== Development history ==
IDA grew out of the typical practice of scaling accelerograms by multiplying with a constant factor to represent more or less severe ground motions than the ones that were recorded at a site. Since the natural recordings available are never enough to cover all possible needs, scaling is a simple, yet potentially problematic method (if misused) to "fill-in" gaps in the current catalog of events. Still, in most cases, researchers would scale only a small set of three to seven records and typically only once, just to get an estimate of response in the area of interest.

In the wake of the damage wrought by the 1994 Northridge earthquake, the SAC/FEMA project was launched to resolve the issue of poor performance of steel moment-resisting frames due to the fracturing beam-column connections. Within the creative environment of research cooperation, the idea of subjecting a structure to a wider range of scaling emerged. Initially, the method was called Dynamic Pushover and it was conceived as a way to estimate a proxy for the global collapse of the structure. It was later recognized that such a method would also enable checking for multiple limit-states, e.g. for life-safety, as is the standard for most seismic design methods, but also for lower and higher levels of intensity that represent different threat levels, such as immediate-occupancy and collapse-prevention. Thus, the idea for Incremental Dynamic Analysis was born, which was mainly adopted and later popularized by researchers at the John A. Blume Earthquake Research Center of Stanford University. This has now met with wider recognition in the earthquake research community and has spawned several different methods and concepts for estimating structural performance.

A substantial debate has been raised regarding the potential bias in the IDA results due to using the scaled ground motions records that do not appropriately characterize the seismic hazard of the considered site over different earthquake intensity levels.

== See also ==
- C. Allin Cornell
