= IEEE 693 =

International Standard

The IEEE 693: Recommended Practice for Seismic Design of Substations. is a Institute of Electrical and Electronics Engineers standard. This standard is recognized also by American National Standards Institute, and is used mainly in the American Continent.

The goal of the standard is to provide a single set of rules and regulations that cover the seismic design of both new and existing electrical substations, hence leading to standardization. The standard provides the minimum requirements that the design of an electrical substation (except nuclear power plants) must adhere to. The norm includes the design of circuit breakers, transformers, disconnect and grounding switches, instrument transformers, circuit switches, surge arresters, and other equipment.

== Contents ==
The norm contains the 8 chapters named below:

1. Overview
2. Normative references
3. Definitions, acronyms, and abbreviations
4. Instructions
  1. General
  2. Specifying this recommended practice in user's specification
  3. Standardization of criteria
  4. Selection of qualification level
  5. Witnessing of shake-table testing
  6. Optional qualification methods
  7. Qualifying equipment by group
  8. Inherently acceptable equipment
  9. Shake-table facilities
  10. Equipment too large to be tested in its in-service configuration
  11. Report templates
5. Installation considerations
  1. General
  2. Equipment assembly
  3. Site response characteristics
  4. Soil-structure interaction
  5. Support structures
  6. Base isolation
  7. Suspended equipment
  8. Anchorage
  9. Conductor induced loading
    1. Interconnections with adjacent equipment
    2. Observed component displacements
    3. Decoupling equipment through flexible bus-work
    4. Conductor installation
  10. Short-circuit loads
  11. Wind and ice loads
6. Qualification methods: an overview
  1. General
  2. Analysis methods
    1. Static analysis
    2. Static coefficient analysis
    3. Response spectrum dynamic analysis
    4. Time history dynamic analysis
  3. Testing methods
  4. Special test cases
  5. Qualification method for specific equipment
  6. Functionality of equipment
  7. Qualification by seismic experience data
  8. Response spectra
  9. Damping
7. Design considerations
  1. Structural supports, excluding foundations
  2. Foundation analysis
  3. Station service
  4. Emergency power systems
  5. Telecommunication equipment
8. Seismic performance criteria for electrical substation equipment
  1. Introduction
  2. Objective
  3. Seismic qualification levels
    1. High seismic level
    2. Moderate seismic level
    3. Low seismic level
  4. Projected performance
    1. Performance levels
      1. High
      2. Moderate
      3. Low
  5. Seismic qualification
    1. High and moderate seismic qualification levels
    2. Low seismic qualification level
  6. Selecting the seismic level for seismic qualification

The norm specifies 3 seismic qualification levels (high, medium, low). The Zero Period Acceleration (ZPA) (a.k.a. Peak Ground Acceleration) for the high and the medium qualifications levels are set to be 0.5g and 0.25 respectively (no calculation is required for equipment with "low" qualification), where g stands for acceleration due to gravity. The Peak Acceleration (i.e. the peak of the Response Spectrum) at 2% damping is lower than 1.65g and 0.85g for high and medium qualification respectively, with the cutoff frequency defined as 33Hz.

The qualification is allowed through one of the following:

- Shake Table Testing
- Calculations
  - Static
  - Response Spectrum
  - Time History
- Experience (with justification)

The norm suggests that most equipment in the same area be given the same qualification level (for interchangeability and redundancy).

== Levels ==
The norm suggests two levels for qualification:

1. Performance Level: Typically used for shake table tests
2. Design Level: Half the values of performance level, typically used for calculations

The Peak Ground Acceleration (PGA) suggested for Horizontal Design level (vertical is 80% of horizontal) are:

1. High Design Level: 0.5g
2. Moderate Design Level: 0.25g
3. Low Design Level: 0.1g

== Useful information ==
- The definition of rigidity is 33Hz and above.
- Triaxial combination is to be used for Response Spectrum analysis
- The Required Response Spectra (RRS) is for free field (ground) conditions and does not include the influence of the dynamic characteristics of the building. To account for the building response (for qualification of equipment mounted within the building), two options are provided
  1. A 2% damped response spectrum that represents the position-specific response within the building to the unreduced (elastic) design spectrum as determined according to the building code shall be provided.
  2. Multiplying the RRS by a factor of 2.5 for the purpose of equipment qualification.

== History ==
The first version of the standard was released in 1997, with a revised version released in 2005 and later in 2018.

== Annex ==
There are a total of 22 annexes in the standard, 19 of which are normative, and the other 3 are informative.
