= Response spectrum =

Response of a structure to oscillation

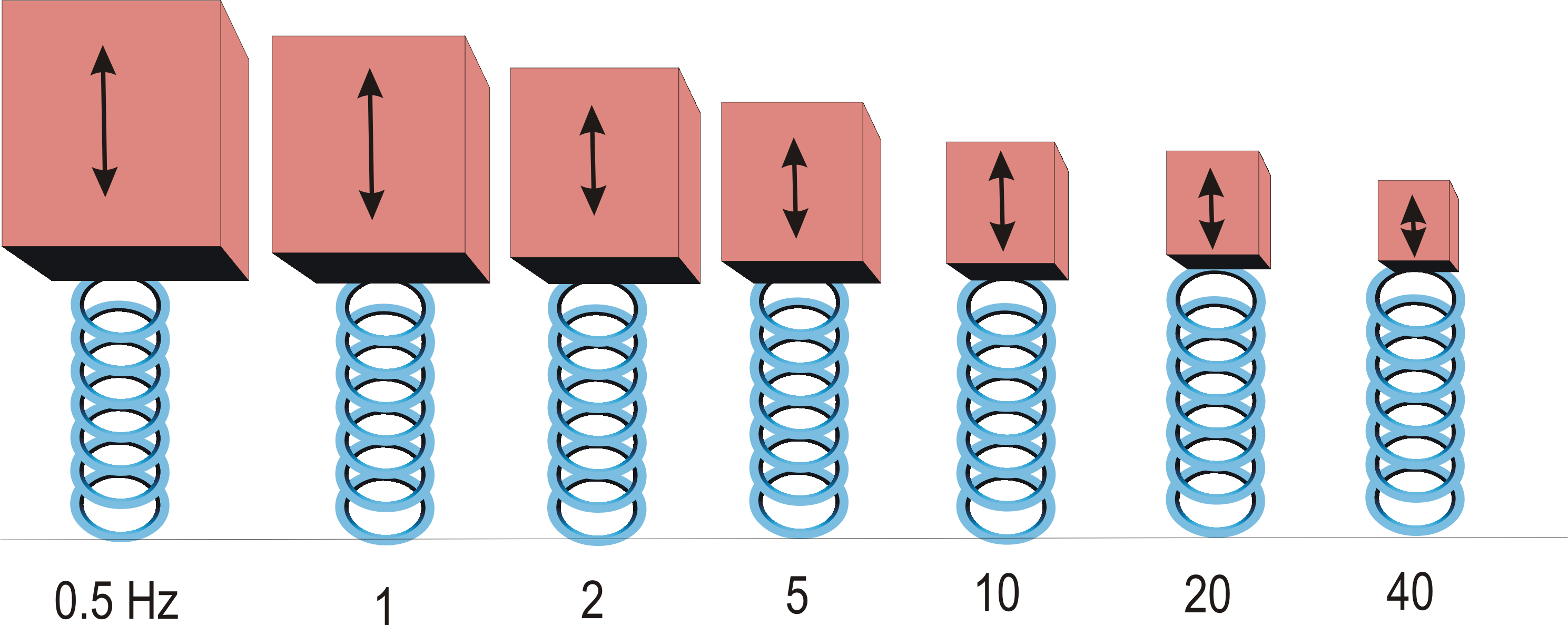
A series of mixed vertical oscillators

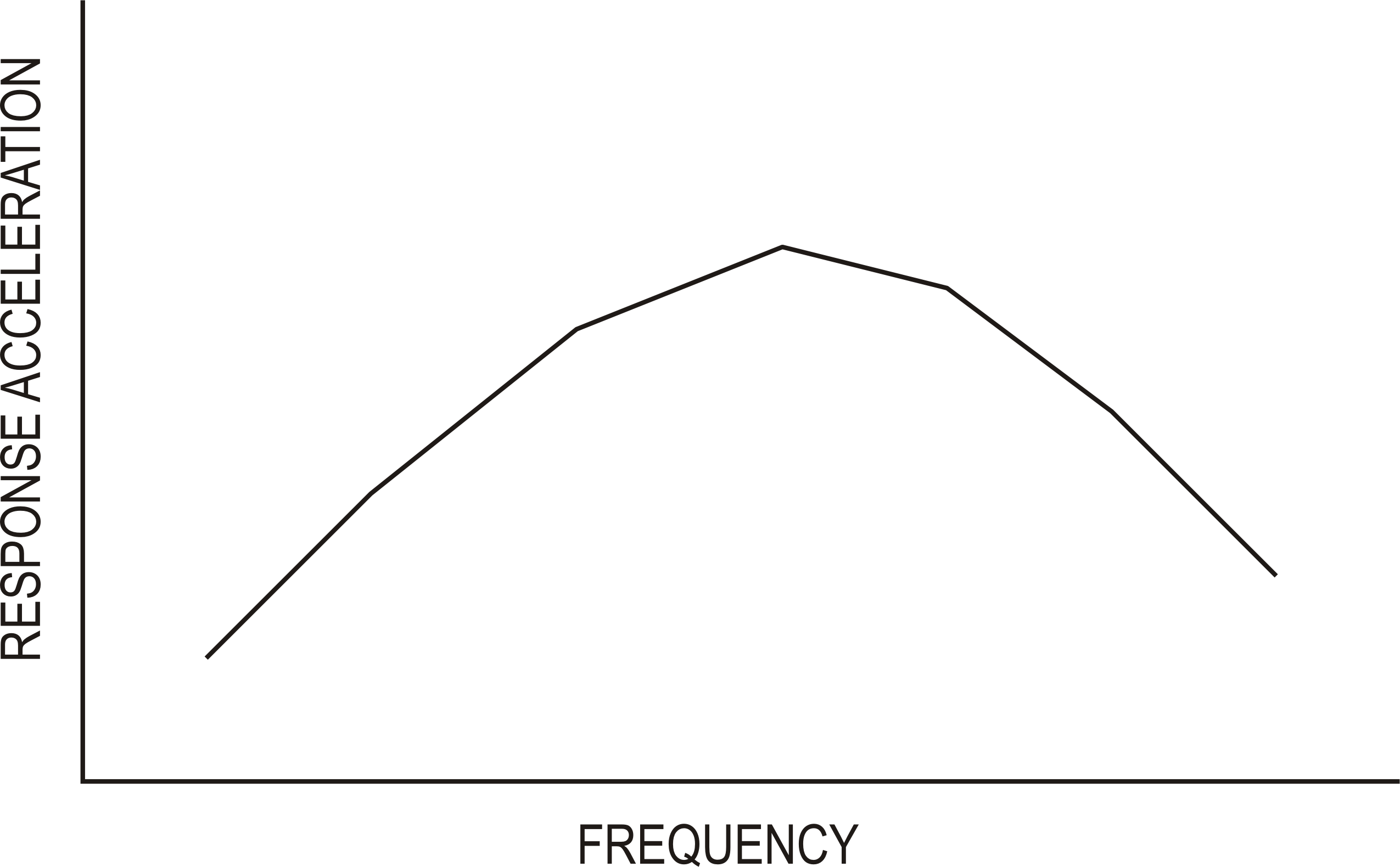
A plot of the peak acceleration for the mixed vertical oscillators

A response spectrum is a plot of the peak or steady-state response (displacement, velocity or acceleration) of a series of oscillators of varying natural frequency, that are forced into motion by the same base vibration or shock. The resulting plot can then be used to pick off the response of any linear system, given its natural frequency of oscillation. One such use is in assessing the peak response of buildings to earthquakes. The science of strong ground motion may use some values from the ground response spectrum (calculated from recordings of surface ground motion from seismographs) for correlation with seismic damage.

If the input used in calculating a response spectrum is steady-state periodic, then the steady-state result is recorded. Damping must be present, or else the response will be infinite. For transient input (such as seismic ground motion), the peak response is reported. Some level of damping is generally assumed, but a value will be obtained even with no damping.

Response spectra can also be used in assessing the response of linear systems with multiple modes of oscillation (multi-degree of freedom systems), although they are only accurate for low levels of damping. Modal analysis is performed to identify the modes, and the response in that mode can be picked from the response spectrum. These peak responses are then combined to estimate a total response. A typical combination method is the square root of the sum of the squares (SRSS) if the modal frequencies are not close. The result is typically different from that which would be calculated directly from an input, since phase information is lost in the process of generating the response spectrum.

The main limitation of response spectra is that they are only universally applicable for linear systems. Response spectra can be generated for non-linear systems, but are only applicable to systems with the same non-linearity, although attempts have been made to develop non-linear seismic design spectra with wider structural application. The results of this cannot be directly combined for multi-mode response.

== Seismic response spectra ==
Response spectra are very useful tools of earthquake engineering for analyzing the performance of structures and equipment in earthquakes, since many behave principally as simple oscillators (also known as single degree of freedom systems). Thus, if you can find out the natural frequency of the structure, then the peak response of the building can be estimated by reading the value from the ground response spectrum for the appropriate frequency. In most building codes in seismic regions, this value forms the basis for calculating the forces that a structure must be designed to resist (seismic analysis).

As mentioned earlier, the ground response spectrum is the response plot done at the free surface of the earth. Significant seismic damage may occur if the building response is 'in tune' with components of the ground motion (resonance), which may be identified from the response spectrum. This was observed in the 1985 Mexico City Earthquake where the oscillation of the deep-soil lake bed was similar to the natural frequency of mid-rise concrete buildings, causing significant damage. Shorter (stiffer) and taller (more flexible) buildings suffered less damage.

In 1941 at Caltech, George W. Housner began to publish calculations of response spectra from accelerographs. In the 1982 EERI Monograph on "Earthquake Design and Spectra", Newmark and Hall describe how they developed an "idealized" seismic response spectrum based on a range of response spectra generated for available earthquake records. This was then further developed into a design response spectrum for use in structural design, and this basic form (with some modifications) is now the basis for structural design in seismic regions throughout the world (typically plotted against structural "period", the inverse of frequency). A nominal level of damping is assumed (5% of critical damping).

For "regular" low-rise buildings, the structural response to earthquakes is characterized by the fundamental mode (a "waving" back-and-forth), and most building codes permit design forces to be calculated from the design spectrum on the basis of that frequency, but for more complex structures, combination of the results for many modes (calculated through modal analysis) is often required. In extreme cases, where structures are either too irregular, too tall or of significance to a community in disaster response, the response spectrum approach is no longer appropriate, and more complex analysis is required, such as non-linear static or dynamic analysis like in seismic performance analysis technique.

== See also ==
- Peak ground acceleration
- Spectral acceleration
