= Arturo Arias =

Arturo Arias may refer to:

- Arturo Arias (writer) (born 1950), Guatemalan novelist
- Arturo Arias (engineer) (1923–2001), Chilean engineer
