= Accelerograph =

Scientific instrument

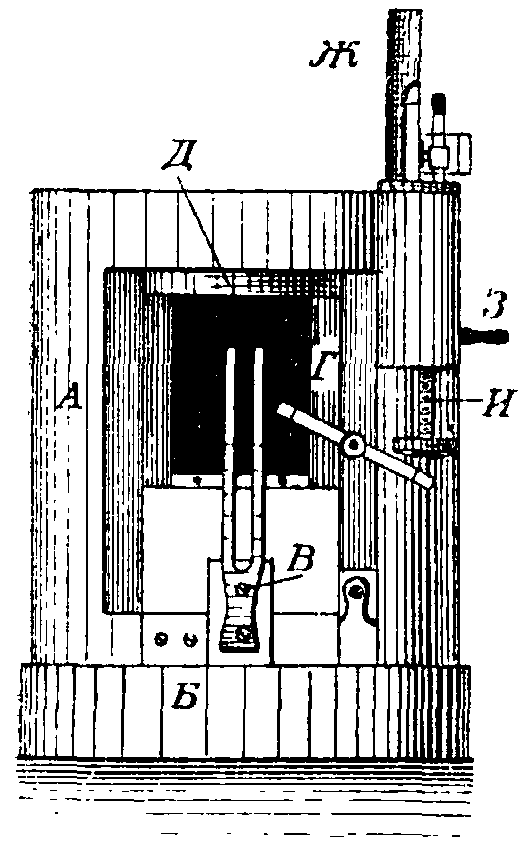
Sketch of an accelerograph by Marcel Deprez

An accelerograph can be referred to as a strong-motion instrument or seismograph, or simply an earthquake accelerometer. They are usually constructed as a self-contained box, which previously included a paper or film recorder (an analogue instrument) but now they often record directly on digital media and then the data is transmitted via the Internet.

Accelerographs are useful for when the earthquake ground motion is so strong that it causes the more sensitive seismometers to go off-scale. There is an entire science of strong ground motion, that is dedicated to studying the shaking in the vicinity of earthquakes (roughly within about 100 km of the fault rupture).

Accelerographs record the acceleration of the ground with respect to time. This recording is often called an accelerograms, strong-motion record or acceleration time-history. From this record strong-motion intensity measures (IMs, also called parameters) can be computed. The simplest of which is peak ground acceleration (PGA). Other IMs include Arias intensity, peak ground velocity (PGV), for which the accelerogram needs to be integrated once, peak ground displacement (PGD), for which double integration is required. Often a response spectrum is computed to show how the earthquake would affect structures of different natural frequencies or periods. These observations are useful to assess the seismic hazard of an area.

As well as their engineering applications, accelerograms are also useful for the study earthquakes from a scientific viewpoint. For example, accelerograms can be used to reconstruct the detailed history of rupture along a fault during an earthquake, which would not be possible with seismograms from standard instruments because they would be too far away to resolve the details. An example of an accelerograph array that was established to improve knowledge of near-source earthquake shaking as well as earthquake rupture propagation is the Parkfield Experiment, which involved a massive set of strong motion instrumentation.

Within the accelerograph, there is an arrangement of three accelerometer sensing heads. In recent low-cost instruments these are usually micro-machined (MEMS) chips that are sensitive to one direction. Thus constructed, the accelerometer can measure full motion of the device in three dimensions.

Unlike the continually recording seismometer, accelerometers nearly always work in a triggered mode. That means a level of acceleration must be set which starts the recording process. For analogue and older digital instruments this makes maintenance much more difficult without a direct Internet connection (or some other means of communication). Many trips have been made to accelerometers after a large earthquake, only to find that the memory was filled with extraneous noise, or the instrument was malfunctioning.

Accelerometers are used to monitor the response of structures to earthquakes. Analysis of these records along with the shaking recorded at base of the structure can improve building design, through earthquake engineering.
