= 1994 Northridge earthquake =

Earthquake in Los Angeles, California

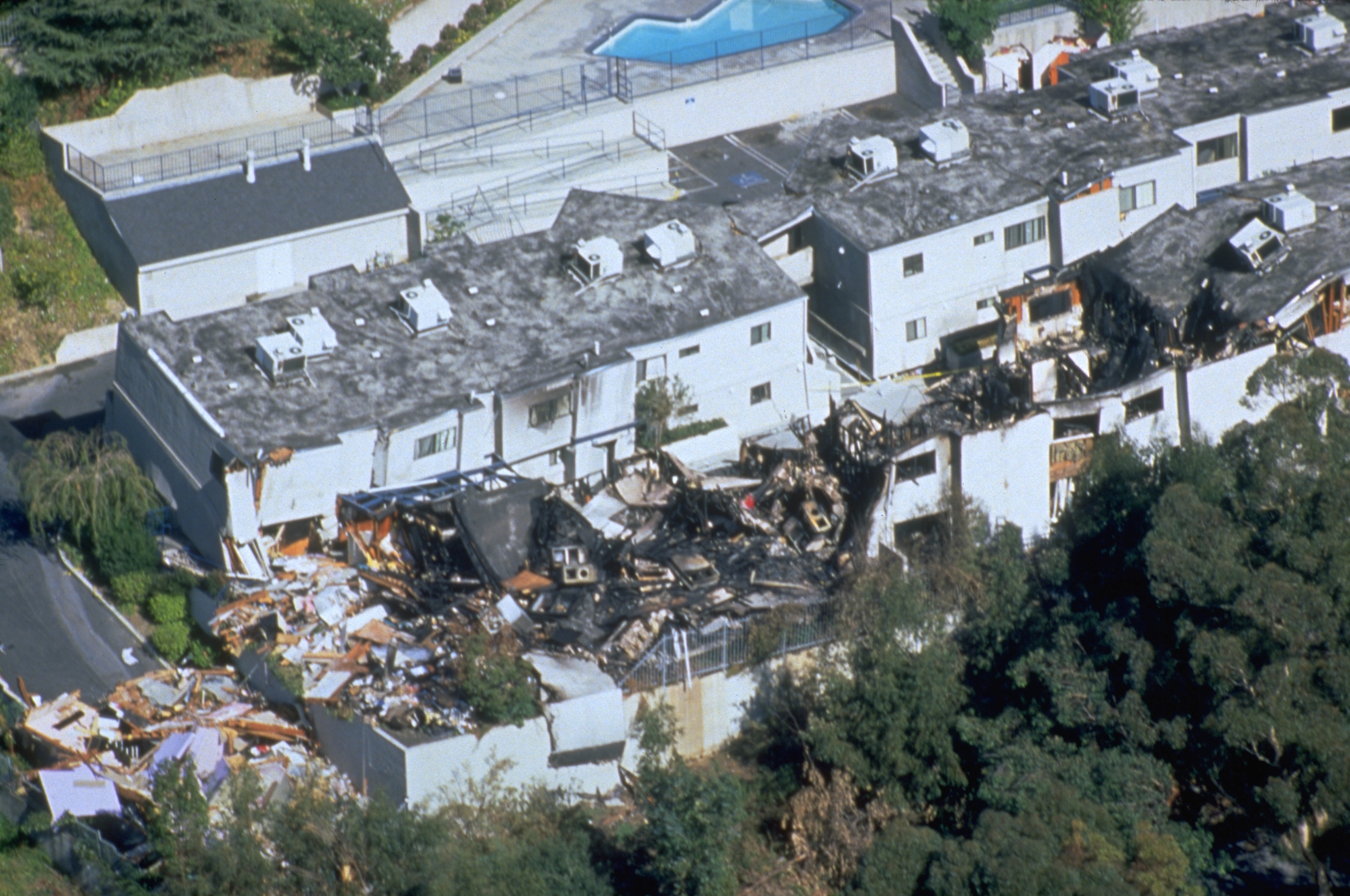
- Aerial view of the destruction

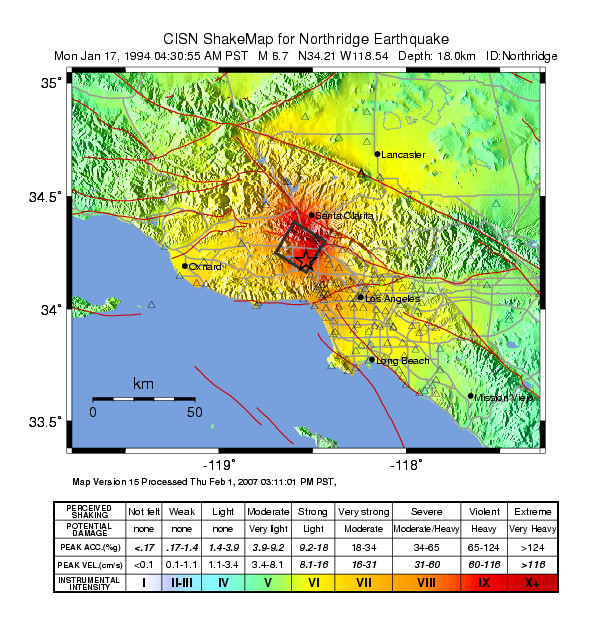
- ShakeMap for the event created by the United States Geological Survey

- UTC time: 1994-01-17 12:30:55
- ISC event: 189275
- USGS-ANSS: ComCat
- Local date: January 17, 1994; 32 years ago
- Local time: 4:30:55 a.m. PST
- Duration: 8 seconds
- Magnitude: 6.7 M_{w}
- Depth: 11.31 mi (18.20 km)
- Epicenter: 34.213°N 118.537°W
- Fault: Northridge Blind Thrust Fault
- Type: Blind thrust
- Areas affected: Greater Los Angeles Area; Southern California; United States
- Total damage: $13–50 billion
- Max. intensity: MMI IX (Violent)
- Peak acceleration: 1.82 g
- Peak velocity: >170 cm/s
- Casualties: 57 killed >8,700 injured

Magnitude of the earthquake and aftershocks

The 1994 Northridge earthquake affected Greater Los Angeles, California, United States, on January 17, 1994, at 04:30:55 PST. The epicenter of the moment magnitude 6.7 (M_{w}) blind thrust earthquake was beneath the San Fernando Valley. The shock lasted approximately 8 seconds and achieved a peak ground acceleration of over 1.7 g. It is the largest recorded earthquake in the area's history, slightly surpassing the M_{w} 6.6 1971 San Fernando earthquake. Shaking was felt as far away as San Diego, California; Turlock, California; Las Vegas, Nevada; Richfield, Utah; Phoenix, Arizona; and Ensenada, Baja California, Mexico. Sixty people died and more than 9,000 were injured. In addition, property damage was estimated to be $13–50 billion, making it among the costliest natural disasters in U.S. history.

== Geology ==
The epicenter region of the earthquake was located in the San Fernando Valley, about 30 km (19 mi) northwest of downtown Los Angeles. The United States Geological Survey (USGS) placed the hypocenter's geographical coordinates at 34.213°N 118.537°W and at a depth of 11.31 mi (18.20 km). Measuring M_{w} 6.7, it was the largest earthquake recorded in the Los Angeles area since the 1971 San Fernando earthquake (M_{w} 6.7). However, unlike the Northridge earthquake, the San Fernando shock occurred on a north–northeast dipping thrust fault beneath the San Gabriel Mountains. Motion during the Northridge event occurred along a south–southwest dipping blind thrust fault beneath the valley. The rupture propagated upward and northwestward along the fault plane for eight seconds at speeds of ~3 km (1.9 mi) per second. The fault planes that produced both earthquakes run parallel to each other. Several other faults experienced minor rupture during the main shock and other ruptures occurred during large aftershocks, or triggered events. The previously undiscovered fault that ruptured in 1994 was subsequently named the Northridge Blind Thrust Fault or Pico Thrust Fault.

Thrust faulting in the northern Los Angeles basin occurs in response to north–south crustal shortening. The fault responsible for the earthquake represented a component of a larger system of faults within the 160 km (99 mi) "Big Bend" stepover of the San Andreas Fault. Crustal compression occurs along this bend of the San Andreas Fault. The Transverse Range and Los Angeles basin hosts east–west striking thrust faults and folds that accommodate over 10 mm (0.39 in) of the compressive motion annually. This zone comprises north and south dipping faults that run subparallel to each other. Most of these faults are buried structures and only a handful reach the surface.

=== Aftershocks ===
Seismic observatories recorded 3,000 aftershocks greater than magnitude 1.5 in the three weeks following the mainshock. By comparing previous aftershock sequences in California against a decay rate equation, the Northridge aftershock activity was highly energetic but decayed marginally more quickly than average. The strongest aftershock, measuring M_{w} 5.9, was recorded one minute after the mainshock. These aftershocks were distributed in three zones; the first zone illuminated a fault structure dipping 35° to 45° at a depth range of 8–19 km (5.0–11.8 mi). Another aftershock zone at shallower depth suggested diffuse tectonic behavior of an anticline above. The third aftershock cluster was in the Santa Susana Mountains after a M_{w} 5.6 aftershock 11 hours after the mainshock. That event and its aftershocks were distributed along a 10 km (6.2 mi) strike and vertically within the crust, likely associated with faults that did not rupture during the mainshock.

=== Ground effects ===
The earthquake caused uplift across 5,000 km^{2} (1,900 sq mi) including the San Fernando Valley. Global Positioning System observations indicate the maximum uplift was 70 cm (28 in). Direct observations at Oat Mountain suggest the Santa Susana Mountains were thrusted up 40 cm (16 in). Across the northern valley area, uplift was as much as 20–40 cm (7.9–15.7 in). The neighborhood of Northridge was raised 20 cm (7.9 in). The USGS described the surface above the zone of greatest fault displacement as compressed into an "asymmetric dome-shaped uplift". There was also 22 cm (8.7 in) of horizontal deformation which was the largest of its kind measured after the mainshock.

The USGS recorded over 11,000 landslides within 10,000 km^{2} (3,900 sq mi); most were recorded throughout a 1,000 km^{2} (390 sq mi) area that comprised the Santa Susana Mountains and ridges north of the Santa Clara River Valley. On average, these documented landslides were under 1,000 m^{3} (35,000 cu ft), although a significant number of them were larger than 100,000 m^{3} (3.5 million ft^{3}). Rotational block slides were thought to be in the tens or hundreds, including a handful measuring over 100,000 m^{3}. The largest block slide measured 8 million m^{3} (280 million ft^{3}). A majority of them occurred in the weak Tertiary to Pleistocene sediments and were previous landslides that became reactivated.

=== Strong ground motion ===
Main shock Mercalli intensities
MMI	Locations
MMI IX (Violent)	Granada Hills, Los Angeles (I-10); Northridge, Santa Monica, Sherman Oaks
MMI VIII (Severe)	San Fernando, Hollywood, Reseda; Chatsworth, Universal City, Van Nuys
MMI VII (Very strong)	Agoura Hills, Beverly Hills, Burbank, Century City; Glendale, Downtown, Culver City
MMI VI (Strong)	Anaheim, Arcadia, Compton, Oxnard, Palmdale
MMI V (Moderate)	Bullhead City, Chino, Inglewood, Long Beach, Westmorland
MMI IV (Light)	Barstow, Calexico, El Centro, San Diego
MMI III (Weak)	Parker, Las Vegas, Fresno, Santa Maria

A seismometer at the Cedar Hill Nursery in Tarzana observed the greatest horizontal peak ground acceleration (pga) at 1.82 g, 7 km (4.3 mi) south of the epicenter. The recording was one of the largest observed during an earthquake at the time, yet buildings in the immediate vicinity only sustained broken windows and cracked walls and driveways. It garnered international scientific interest among those who visited the ranch in the aftermath, who installed additional instruments to record the aftershocks. The USGS Strong Motion Instrumentation Program ruled out technical malfunction and ground amplification effects, stating that the abnormally high pga recorded by a rock-bolted seismometer was authentic. The same site also recorded an unusually high pga (0.65 g) during a 1987 earthquake, though no abnormal readings were found during earthquakes in 1991 and 1992. USGS seismologist Rufus Catchings suggested the intense shaking was localised and most of the city was unharmed. A possible contributing factor for the effect is the local soil condition and topography. The maximum vertical pga recorded at the same station was 1.18 g.

Several sites in the valley also recorded pga exceeding 1.0 g. There were over 200 recordings of pga exceeding 0.01 g, and the horizontal component pga was larger than average for a reverse-mechanism event. A possible explanation for the high pga is due to the large seismic moment release within a small fault rupture. A peak ground velocity (pgv) of 148 cm (58 in) per second was measured at a station in Granada Hills. At the Sylmar county hospital, 15 km (9.3 mi) north–northeast of the epicenter, the pgv in the horizontal component was 130 cm (51 in) per second. South of the hospital, the Los Angeles Department of Water and Power Rinaldi Receiving Station recorded a pgv exceeding 170 cm (67 in) per second.

== Damage and fatalities ==
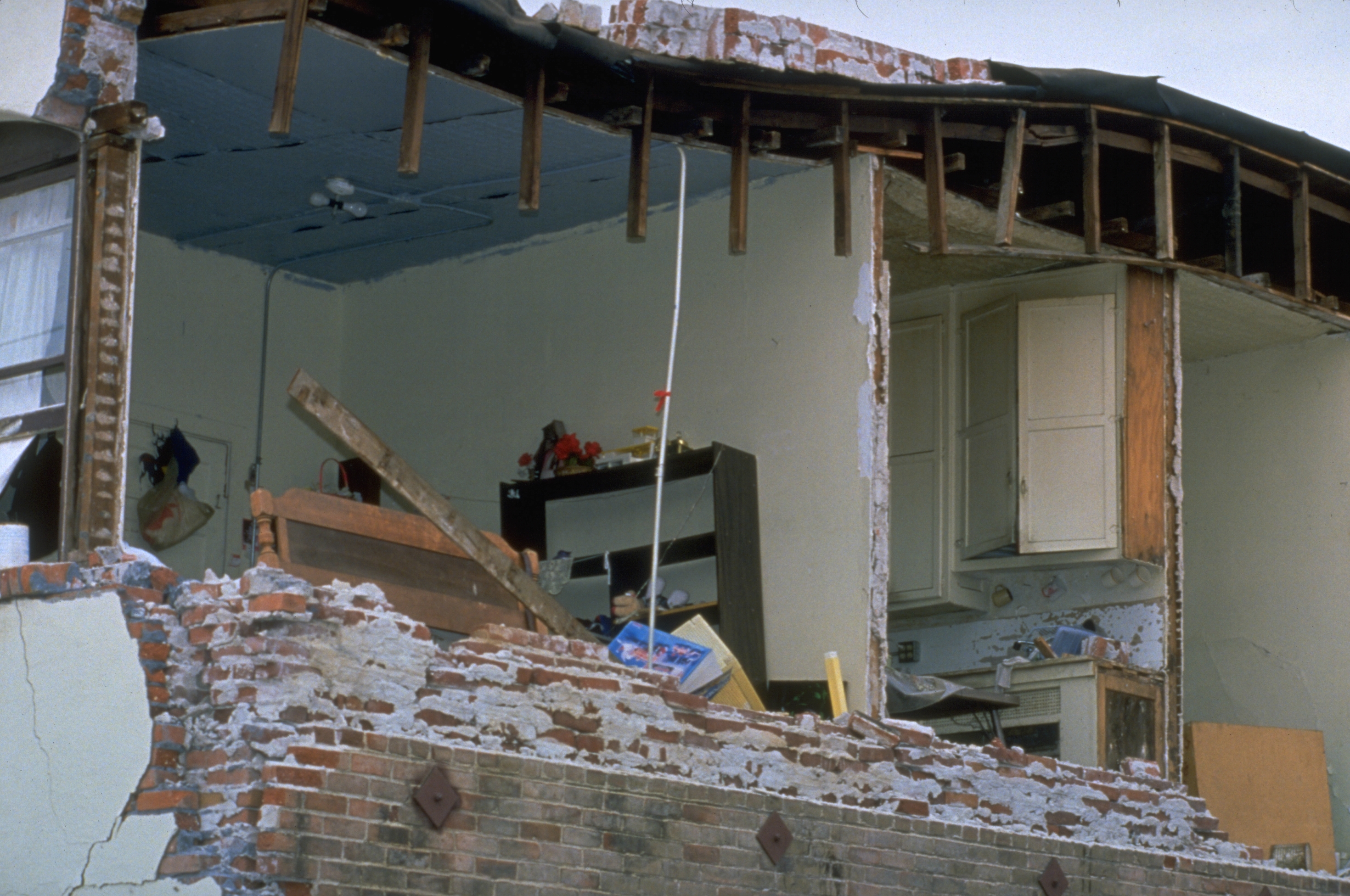
Building damage in Santa Monica, California

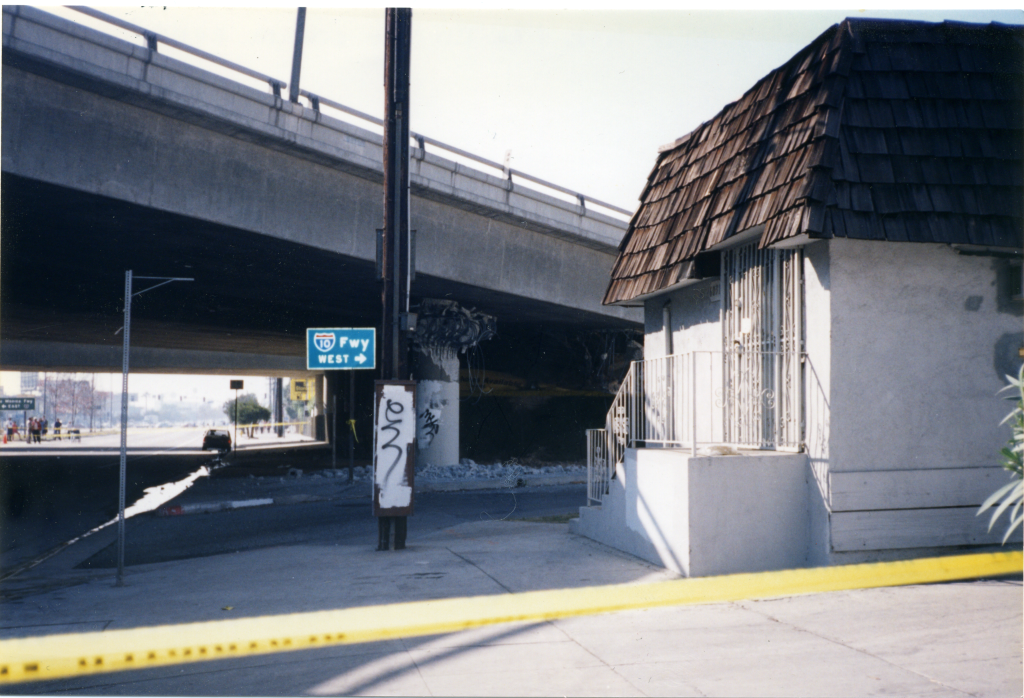
Crushed column (center) along section of Interstate 10 that collapsed

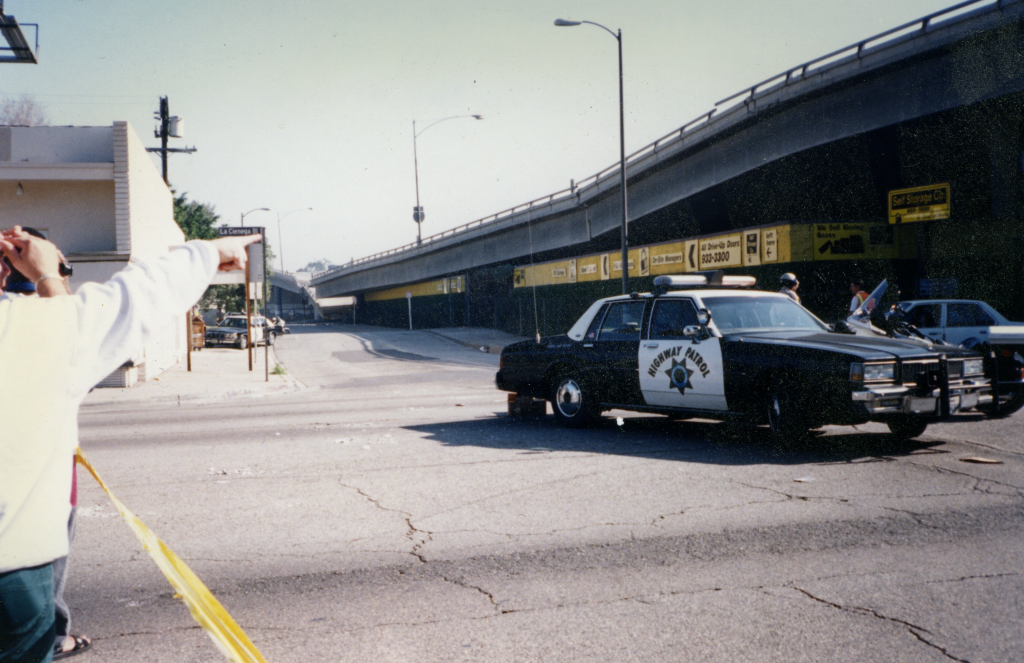
Collapsed section (left of the police car) and sag leading to it

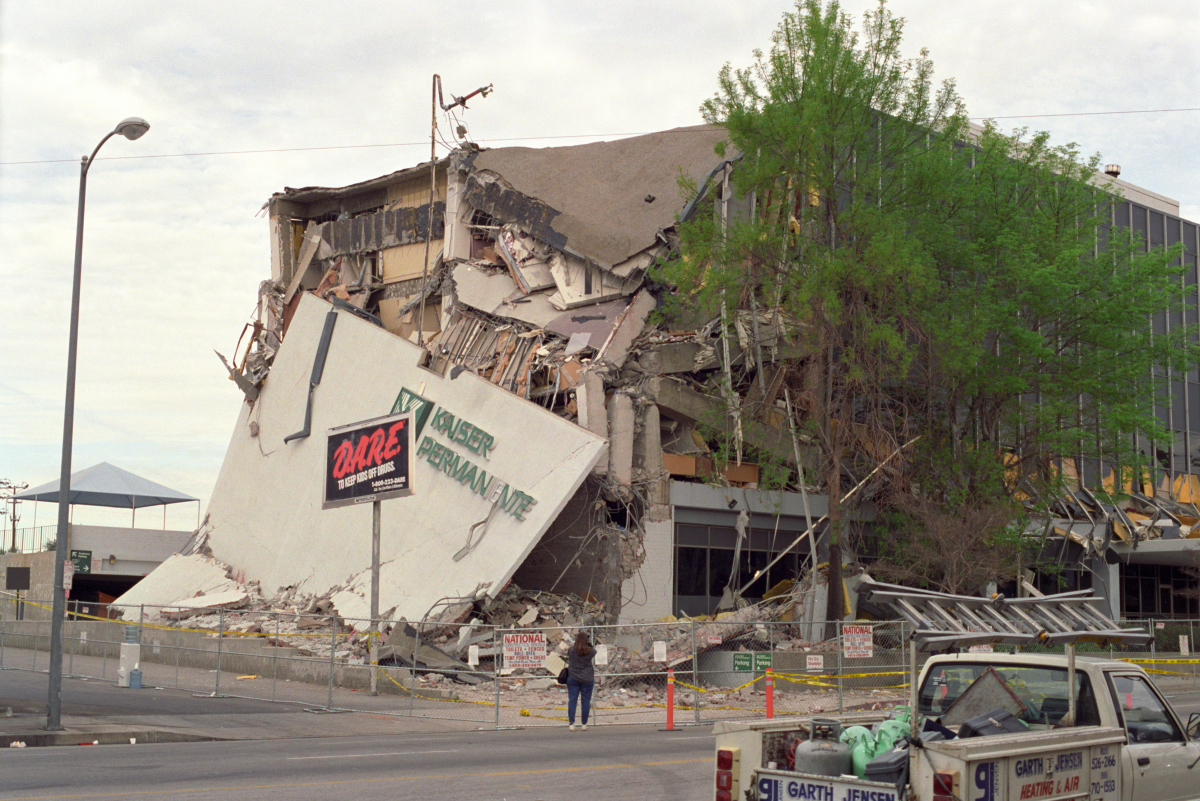
Kaiser Permanente building in Granada Hills

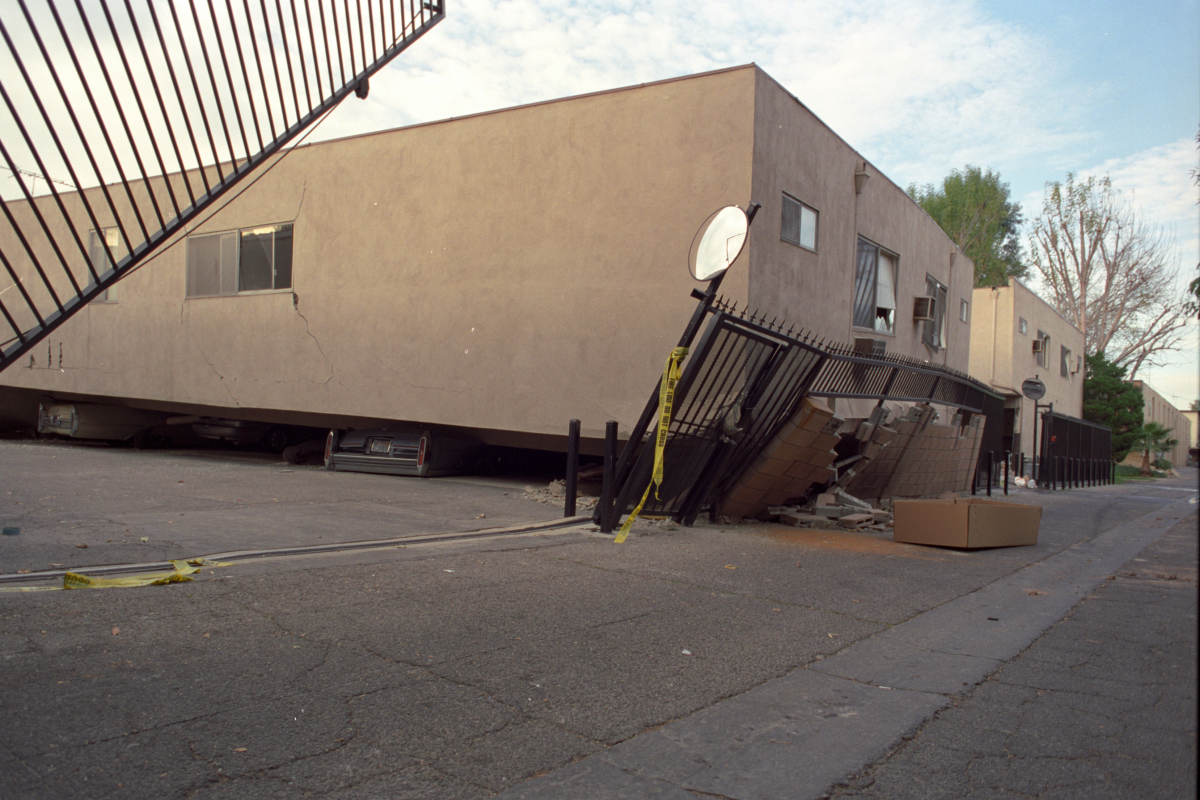
Apartment building that collapsed onto its own footprint, crushing cars parked beneath it

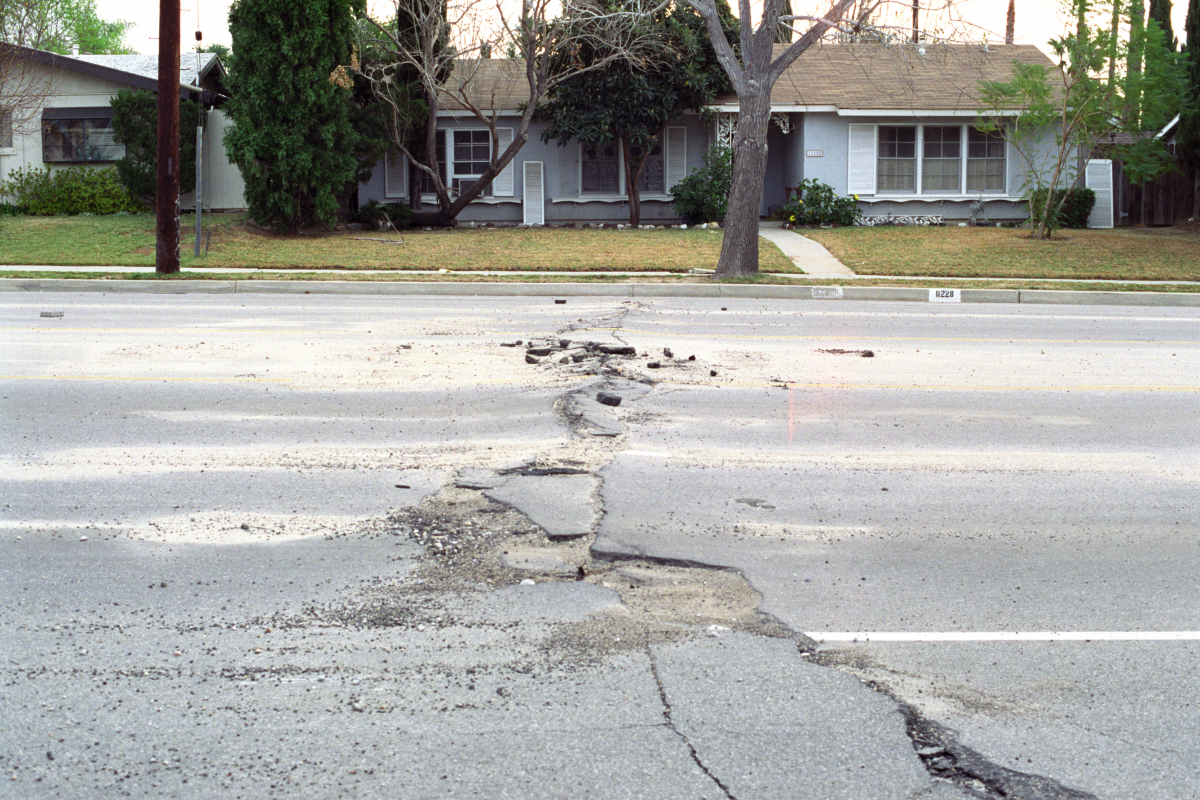
Buckled pavement

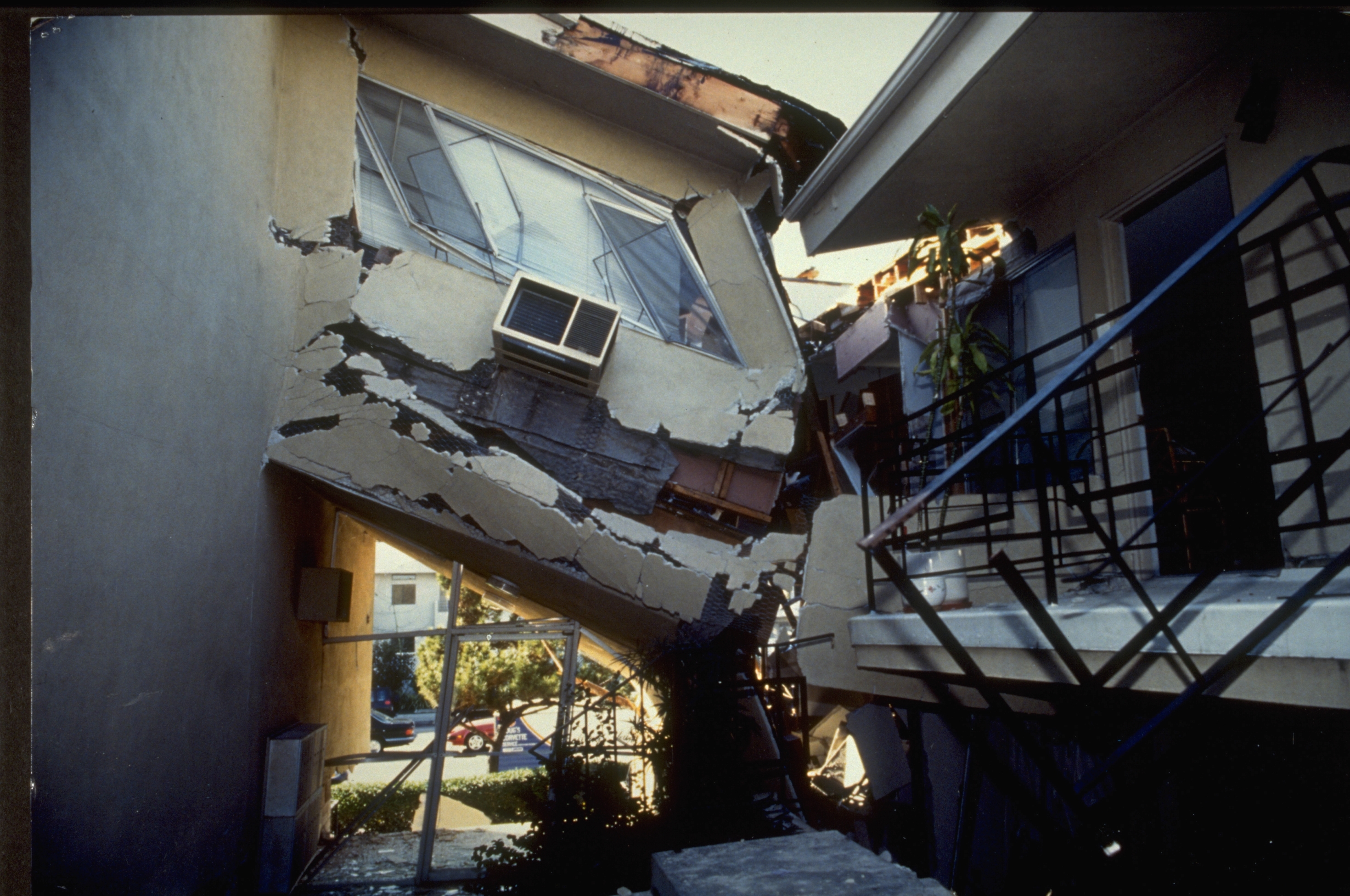
Northridge Meadows apartment complex significantly damaged by the earthquake

Damage occurred up to 85 miles (137 km) away although it was concentrated in the west San Fernando Valley, and the cities and neighborhoods of Santa Monica, Hollywood, Simi Valley, and Santa Clarita. The Historic Egyptian Theater in Hollywood was red-tagged and closed as was the Capital Theater in Glendale due to structural damage. The exact number of fatalities is unknown, with sources estimating the number to be 60 or "over 60", to 72, where most estimates fall around 60. The "official" death toll was placed at 57; 33 people died immediately or within a few days from injuries sustained, and many died from indirect causes, such as stress-induced cardiac events. Some counts factor in related events such as a man's suicide possibly inspired by the loss of his business in the disaster. More than 8,700 were injured including 1,600 who required hospitalization. Actress Iris Adrian died in September 1994 from complications of a broken hip she suffered in the earthquake.

Sixteen people were killed as a result of the collapse of the Northridge Meadows apartment complex. The Northridge Fashion Center and California State University, Northridge also sustained very heavy damage – most notably the collapse of parking structures. The earthquake also gained worldwide attention because of damage to the vast freeway network, which serves millions of commuters every day. The most notable was to the Santa Monica Freeway, Interstate 10, known as the busiest freeway in the United States, congesting nearby surface roads for three months while the freeway was repaired. Farther north, the Newhall Pass interchange of Interstate 5 (the Golden State Freeway) and State Route 14 (the Antelope Valley Freeway) collapsed as it had 23 years earlier in the 1971 San Fernando earthquake, even though it had been rebuilt with minor improvements to the structural components. LAPD motorcycle officer Clarence Wayne Dean died because of the collapse of the Newhall Pass interchange, falling 40 feet from the damaged connector from southbound 14 to southbound I-5. He likely did not realize until too late in the early morning darkness that the elevated roadway had collapsed. The rebuilt interchange was renamed in his honor a year later.

Additional damage occurred about 50 miles (80 km) southeast in the city of Anaheim, located in Orange County, as the scoreboard at Anaheim Stadium collapsed onto several hundred seats. Most casualties and damage occurred in multi-story wood-frame buildings (such as the three-story Northridge Meadows apartment building). In particular, buildings with an unstable first floor (such as those with parking areas on the bottom) performed poorly. Numerous fires were also caused by broken gas lines from houses shifting off their foundations or unsecured water heaters tumbling. Slope side homes supported on one side by a concrete foundation and stilts on the other were also prone to collapse such as in Sherman Oaks where nine stilt homes crashed down a slope, killing four. In the San Fernando Valley, several underground gas and water lines were severed, resulting in some streets experiencing simultaneous fires and floods. Damage to the system resulted in water pressure dropping to zero in some areas; this predictably affected success in fighting subsequent fires. Five days later, it was estimated that between 40,000 and 60,000 customers were still without public water service.

== Valley fever outbreak ==
An unusual effect of the Northridge earthquake was an outbreak of coccidioidomycosis (Valley fever) in Ventura County. This respiratory disease is caused by inhaling airborne spores of the fungus. The 203 cases reported, of which three resulted in fatalities, constituted roughly ten times the normal rate in the initial eight weeks. This was the first report of such an outbreak following an earthquake, and it is believed that the spores were carried in large clouds of dust created by seismically triggered landslides. Most of the cases occurred immediately downwind of the landslides.

== Facilities and infrastructure affected ==
=== Hospitals ===
Eleven hospitals suffered structural damage and were damaged or rendered unusable. Not only were they unable to serve their local neighborhoods, but they also had to transfer out their inpatient populations, which further increased the burden on nearby hospitals that were still operational.

As a result, the state legislature enacted Senate Bill 1953 to amend the Hospital Facilities Seismic Safety Act to require all hospitals in California to ensure that their acute care units and emergency rooms would be in earthquake-resistant buildings by January 1, 2005. Most were unable to meet this deadline and belatedly came into compliance during the 2010s.

=== Television, movie, and music productions ===
The production of movies and television shows was disrupted. At the time of the quake, before dawn on Monday morning, the Warner Bros. film Murder in the First (with Christian Slater, Kevin Bacon, and Gary Oldman) was being filmed only four miles (6.4 km) from the epicenter. Production came to a halt. The main courtroom set was in shambles. The building containing the set was later "red tagged" as unsafe due to the damage it sustained. The Star Trek: Deep Space Nine episode "Profit and Loss" was being filmed at the time, and actors Armin Shimerman and Edward Wiley left the Paramount Pictures lot in full Ferengi and Cardassian makeup, respectively. The season five episode of Seinfeld entitled "The Pie" was due to begin shooting on January 17 before stage sets were damaged. Also, ABC's General Hospital set at ABC Television Center suffered partial structural collapse and water damage.

An earthquake scene was written in the screenplay of Wes Craven's New Nightmare and the earthquake occurred in the middle of its production timeline. Subsequently, the production company, New Line Cinema, incorporated real-life footage of the earthquake aftermath into the final cut.

Some archives of film and entertainment programming were also affected. For example, the original 35 mm (1.4 in) master films for the 1960s sitcom My Living Doll were destroyed.

In January 1994 Michael Jackson planned to record his new album HIStory: Past, Present and Future, Book I but due to the earthquake, which terrified Jackson, they were moved to New York at The Hit Factory.

=== Transportation ===
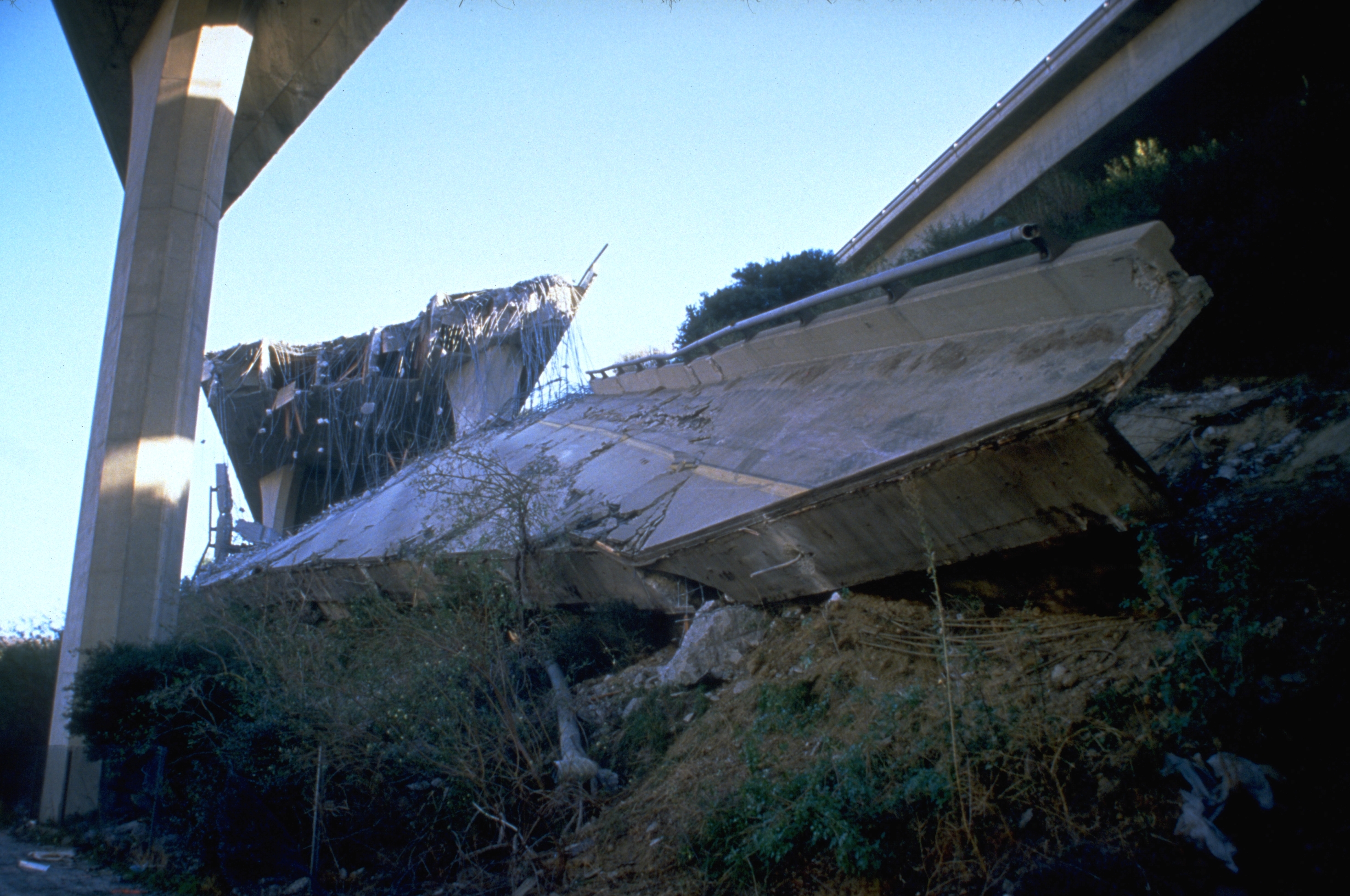
Complete failure of the Golden State Freeway at Gavin Canyon

Portions of a number of major roads and freeways, including Interstate 10 over La Cienega Boulevard, and the interchanges of Interstate 5 with California State Route 14, 118, and Interstate 210, were closed because of structural failure or collapse. James E. Roberts was chief bridge engineer with Caltrans and was placed in charge of the seismic retrofit program for Caltrans until his death in 2006.

Rail service was briefly interrupted, with full Amtrak and expanded Metrolink service resuming in stages in the days after the quake. Interruptions to road transport caused Metrolink to experiment with service to Camarillo in February and Oxnard in April, which continues today as the Ventura County Line, and extended the Antelope Valley Line almost ten years ahead of schedule. Six new stations opened in six weeks. Metrolink leased equipment from Amtrak, San Francisco's Caltrain, and Toronto, Canada's GO Transit to handle the sudden onslaught of passengers. Amtrak ceased service in the Pasadena Subdivision following structural damage to a rail bridge in Arcadia and redirected all rail traffic through Riverside and Fullerton. All MTA bus lines operated service with detours and delays on the day of the quake. Los Angeles International Airport and other airports in the area were also shut down as a two-hour precaution, including Burbank–Glendale–Pasadena Airport (now Hollywood Burbank Airport) and Van Nuys Airport, which is near the epicenter, where the control tower suffered from radar failure and panel collapse. The airport was reopened in stages after the quake.

=== California State University, Northridge ===
California State University, Northridge (CSUN), was the closest university to the epicenter. Many campus buildings were heavily damaged and a parking structure collapsed. Many classes were moved to temporary structures. Much of the campus infrastructure was damaged and there were multiple fires and explosions throughout the campus. The earthquake damaged several buildings and destroyed all communications, including telephone lines, and caused computer systems to shut down. Two CSUN students died at the Northridge Meadows Complex along with 14 other residents.

==== Campus damage ====
All 58 buildings on campus sustained significant damage, resulting in a $406 million recovery effort. The Oviatt Library experienced both interior and exterior damage, but the overall frame of the central part of the building remained stable, allowing student use to continue. In the Science Complex, Building #1 and #2 suffered fire damage while the bridges connecting buildings #3 and #4 were closed and named unstable. The University Tower apartments, Fine Arts Building and the South Library were damaged beyond repair and demolished. Photographs of the recently constructed Parking Structure C which collapsed became synonymous with the earthquake's effects on the university.

==== Classes and enrollment ====
The damage delayed the start of the 1994 Spring semester by two weeks. The campus mobilised 335 makeshift structures for its usage. Some 25 classes were held at Pierce College, LA City College and UCLA, while others were outdoors or in trailer buildings. The campus was unable to use any of its classrooms because of the damage the buildings sustained. CSUN President Dr. Blenda Wilson assured the rental of temporary structures to be placed in available spaces throughout the campus. An estimated $350 million (equivalent to $760 million today) was used to supply the number of trailers and domes which housed classes and administration offices. Enrollment dropped by approximately 1,000 students, leaving some homeless as dormitories were closed due to damage that rendered them unsafe and which required repair.

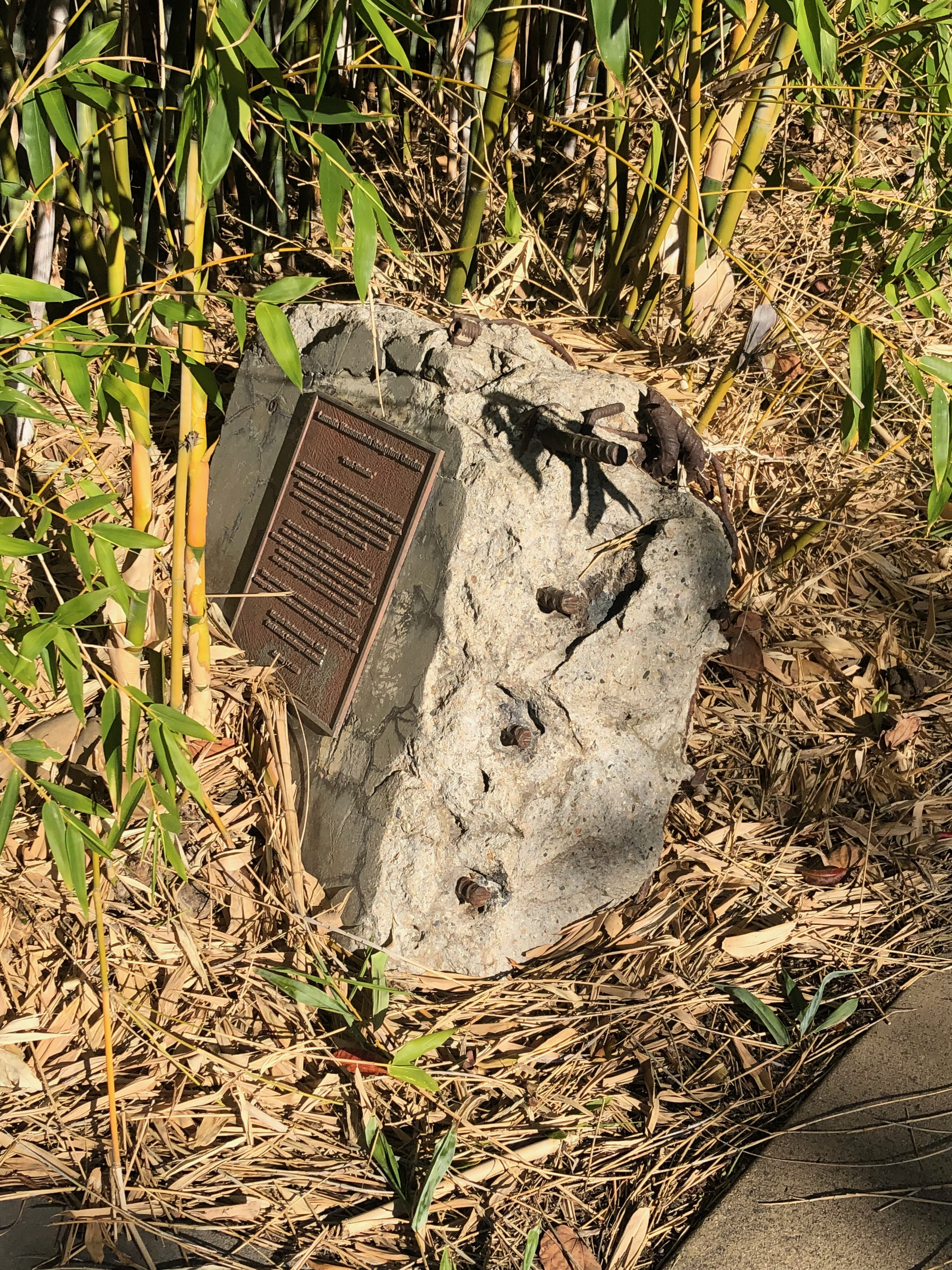
"An earthquake is the shifting of land, a force of nature that affects the natural, built and economic landscape." – Lauretta Wasserstein Sculpture Garden

==== External resources ====
The seismic event led to millions of dollars' worth of damage resulting in a sharp drop in student enrollment. CSUN received financial assistance for its efforts in reestablishing the damaged buildings with monetary gifts from the McCarthy Foundation, the Common Wealth Fund, and the Union Bank Foundation. In addition, the campus received a $23,000 check (equivalent to $50,000 today) from the Los Angeles Times Valley Edition for the journalism department. CSUN also received assistance from government agencies FEMA and OES to support the recovery effort and serve the needs of the local community. UCLA's Westwood campus opened their doors and allowed CSUN students to use their libraries while providing shuttle buses to and from the university.

=== Entertainment and sports ===
Universal Studios Hollywood shut down the Earthquake attraction, based on the 1974 motion picture blockbuster, Earthquake. It was closed for the second time since the Loma Prieta earthquake. Angel Stadium of Anaheim (then known as Anaheim Stadium) suffered some damage when the scoreboard fell into the seats, forcing a Mickey Thompson Entertainment Group off-road race at the ballpark to be postponed from that upcoming weekend to February 12.

=== Other buildings ===
Numerous Los Angeles museums, including the Art Deco Building in Hollywood, were closed, as were numerous city shopping malls. Gazzarri's nightclub suffered irreparable damage and had to be torn down. The city of Santa Monica suffered significant damage. Many multifamily apartment buildings in Santa Monica were yellow-tagged and red-tagged. An especially hard hit area was between Santa Monica Canyon and Saint John's Hospital, a linear corridor that suffered a significant amount of property damage. The City of Santa Monica provided assistance to landlords dealing with repairs so tenants could return home as soon as possible. In Valencia, the California Institute of the Arts experienced heavy damage, with classes relocated to a nearby Lockheed test facility for the remainder of 1994. The Los Angeles Unified School District closed local schools throughout the area, which reopened one week later. UCLA and other local universities were also shut down. The University of Southern California suffered some structural damage to several older campus buildings, but classes were conducted as scheduled. Pierce College suffered $2 million in damages, the most affected of the nine Los Angeles community colleges.

== Aftermath ==
=== Lifestyle disruptions in the weeks following ===
In the weeks following the quake, many San Fernando Valley residents had either lost their homes entirely or experienced structural damage too severe to continue living in them without making repairs. Although the vast majority of homes in the area, with the exception of a few particular neighborhoods, were relatively unaffected; many feared an aftershock to rival or exceed the severity of the first one. While a notable aftershock never came, many residents opted to stay in shelters or live with friends and family outside the area for a short time following.

While many businesses remained closed in the days following the quake, some infrastructure was not able to be rebuilt for months, even years later. The daily commute for many drivers in the weeks following was significantly lengthened, notably for those traveling between Santa Clarita and Los Angeles, and commuters on I-10 traveling to and from the Westside. Additionally, many businesses were forced to relocate or use temporary facilities in order to accommodate structural damage to their original locations or the difficulty accessing them. Some people even made temporary relocations closer to their jobs while their homes or neighborhoods were being rebuilt.

=== State legislative response ===
The Northridge earthquake led to a number of legislative changes. Due to the large amount lost by insurance companies, most insurance companies either stopped offering or severely restricted earthquake insurance in California. In response, the California Legislature created the California Earthquake Authority (CEA), which is a publicly managed but privately funded organization that offers minimal coverage. A substantial effort was also made to reinforce freeway bridges against seismic shaking, and a law requiring water heaters to be properly strapped was passed in 1995.

=== Engineering analysis ===
The analysis of the effect of Northridge earthquake on behavior of structures has been investigated by many researchers. For example, the behavior of underground walls has been evaluated for the Northridge earthquake using numerical methods. The comparison of the seismic behavior of underground braced walls with ACI 318 design method reveals that bending moment and shear force of the walls under Northridge earthquake loads were observed to reach 2.8 and 2.7 times as large as the respective allowable limits. Therefore, caution should be taken in seismic design of diaphragm walls using ACI 318 code requirements.

== In popular culture ==
- The Northridge Earthquake was the subject of the 1995 film Epicenter U., a first-hand account of healing from the natural disaster, directed by Alexis Krasilovsky. The Earthquake Haggadah (1995) was a video excerpt from Epicenter U. narrated by Wanda Coleman. Distributed in 3/4" and VHS by the Poetry Film Workshop circa 1998. Re-released as part of the DVD Some Women Writers Kill Themselves in 2008.
- The Northridge earthquake was used as a plot device in the 2004 film A Cinderella Story. The film is a modern retelling of the Cinderella classic starring Hilary Duff and Chad Michael Murray. In it, Duff's character, Sam Montgomery, lives in the San Fernando Valley with her father, stepmother, and two stepsisters. Her father, Hal, perishes in the quake trying to save her stepmother, setting the story in motion.
- A song about the earthquake, set to the tune of "Happy Farmer", was featured in the Animaniacs episode "A Quake, A Quake!".
- The title of the song play I Was Looking at the Ceiling and Then I Saw the Sky by John Adams and June Jordan was a quote from an earthquake survivor. The story's premise also takes places after an earthquake.
- The single "California" from the 1996 Belinda Carlisle album A Woman and a Man features a verse specifically referencing the Northridge Earthquake: "Four in the morning we were in our beds/The swaying palm trees above our heads/Woke up to a primal rumbling sound/When the Northridge quake ripped open the ground/California, California".
- Grant Lee Buffalo song "Mockingbirds" is inspired by the Northridge earthquake, as the singer Grant Lee Phillips and wife lost their house in the event.

== See also ==
- Bibliography of Los Angeles
- Outline of the history of Los Angeles
- Bibliography of California history
- 1987 Whittier Narrows earthquake
- 1992 Landers earthquake
- 1999 Hector Mine earthquake
- 2019 Ridgecrest earthquakes
- List of earthquakes in 1994
- List of earthquakes in California
- List of earthquakes in the United States
