= Arturo Arias (engineer) =

Chilean researcher

- Born: August 10, 1923; Nueva Imperial, Chile
- Died: March 12, 2001 (aged 77); Santiago, Chile
- Education: University of Chile
- Known for: Arias Intensity
- Scientific career
- Fields: Seismology, earthquake engineering, soil mechanics
- Workplaces: University of Chile; Massachusetts Institute of Technology; Engineering Institute of the National Autonomous University of Mexico

Arturo Arias Suárez (Nueva Imperial, August 10, 1923 – Santiago, March 12, 2001) was a Chilean engineer and scientist, known for his contributions in the fields of soil mechanics, earthquake engineering and seismology.

== Career ==
He graduated as a civil engineer from the Faculty of Physical and Mathematical Sciences of the University of Chile in 1948, after publishing his memory of the title called "Oscilations of a high pond". For years he worked as a professor and researcher, starting in 1946 as an assistant in vector calculus and rational mechanics courses.

In 1952 he proposed theoretical bases to apply the general theory of vibrations in the anti-seismic structural engineering, for structures with various degrees of freedom.

In 1954 Arias became the director of Chile's first nuclear physics laboratory, built around a Cockroft-Walton multiplier, an accelerator for ionized particles.

In 1959, he was one of the founders of the Institute of Mathematics and Physics, which was the progenitor of the current Physics Department of the Faculty of Physical and Mathematical Sciences. There he was an academic for more than 50 years. In addition, he was a director of the Institute for Research and Testing of Materials (IDIEM) between 1958 and 1965, a period in which he developed metal laboratories and industrial radiography. He promoted the magazine created by IDIEM through which various scientific publications were made that earned him recognition by Unesco.

He was recognized in the field of seismology for conceiving Instrumental Seismic Intensity, also called Arias Intensity (IA), first released in 1970 by the Massachusetts Institute of Technology Press. Its main contribution is considered "the most reliable instrumental measure used to date" and "used as a reference parameter" for anti-seismic engineering. This parameter was the result of improving an earlier intensity proposed in 1952 by George Housner, by applying Parseval's theorem to it. The mathematical formula for Arias Intensity is:

$I_A = \frac {\pi} {2g} \int_0^{T_d} a (t)^2 dt$ (m/s)

Following his investigations, the anti-seismic safety standards in Chile NCH433 Of.72 were established in 1972, successfully tested during the Santiago earthquake of 1985. And, subsequently, the standard NCH433 Of.96 were established in 1996.

Arias worked as a visiting professor at MIT in 1969, where he taught earthquake engineering. After the 1973 military coup, for "involuntary reasons" he emigrated from Chile to Mexico for some years. There he taught and researched at the Engineering Institute of the National Autonomous University of Mexico between 1976 and 1983. After that, in the 1980s, he returned to University of Chile. Since then he lived periods in both countries, to finally die in Chile in 2003.

== Awards and honours ==
- 1967: Ramón Salas Edwards Award, for his contributions in science and technology.
- 1984: José A. Cuevas Prize, distinguished by the College of Civil Engineers of Mexico.
- 1993: Full member of the Chilean Academy of Sciences.
- 1999: Raúl Devés Jullian Award, for his contributions to engineering education.
- 2000: Distinguished as Professor Emeritus by the University of Chile.
- 2009: BBC chose him as one of the five Latin Americans who changed the world.
