= The Human-Induced Earthquake Database =

Database documenting induced seismicity

The Human-Induced Earthquake Database (HiQuake) is an online database that documents all reported cases of induced seismicity proposed on scientific grounds. It is the most complete compilation of its kind and is freely available to download via the associated website. The database is periodically updated to correct errors, revise existing entries, and add new entries reported in new scientific papers and reports. Suggestions for revisions and new entries can be made via the associated website.

== History ==
In 2016, Nederlandse Aardolie Maatschappij funded a team of researchers from Durham University and Newcastle University to conduct a full review of induced seismicity. This review formed part of a scientific workshop aimed at estimating the maximum possible magnitude earthquake that might be induced by conventional gas production in the Groningen gas field.

The resulting database from the review was publicly released online on the 26 January 2017. The database was accompanied by the publication of two scientific papers, the more detailed of which is freely available online.
