= Northridge Blind Thrust Fault =

Geological feature in California

The Northridge Blind Thrust Fault (also known as the Pico Thrust Fault) is a thrust fault that is located in the San Fernando Valley area of Los Angeles. It is the fault that triggered the M_{w} 6.7 1994 Northridge earthquake which caused $13–50 billion in property damage (equivalent to 24–93 billion today) and was one of the costliest natural disasters in U.S. history.

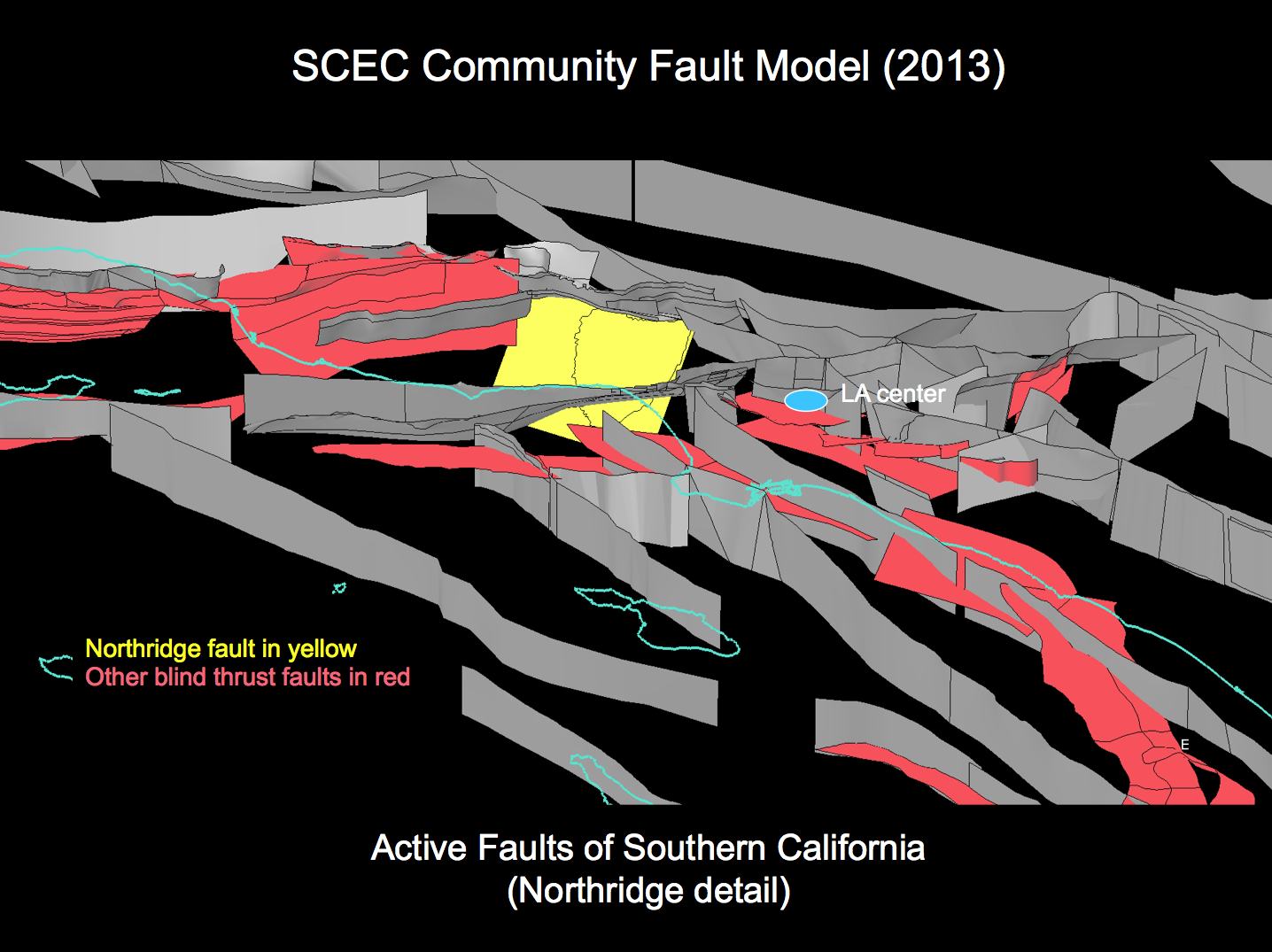
Map showing active faults of California in gray, blind thrust faults in red, and the Northridge Blind Thrust Fault in yellow
