= Seismic analysis =

Study of the response of buildings and structures to earthquakes

First and second modes of building seismic response

Seismic analysis is a subset of structural analysis and is the calculation of the response of a building (or nonbuilding) structure to earthquakes. It is part of the process of structural design, earthquake engineering or structural assessment and retrofit (see structural engineering) in regions where earthquakes are prevalent.

As seen in the figure, a building has the potential to 'wave' back and forth during an earthquake (or even a severe wind storm). This is called the 'fundamental mode', and is the lowest frequency of building response. Most buildings, however, have higher modes of response, which are uniquely activated during earthquakes. The figure just shows the second mode, but there are higher 'shimmy' (abnormal vibration) modes. Nevertheless, the first and second modes tend to cause the most damage in most cases.

The earliest provisions for seismic resistance were the requirement to design for a lateral force equal to a proportion of the building weight (applied at each floor level). This approach was adopted in the appendix of the 1927 Uniform Building Code (UBC), which was used on the west coast of the United States. It later became clear that the dynamic properties of the structure affected the loads generated during an earthquake. In the Los Angeles County Building Code of 1943 a provision to vary the load based on the number of floor levels was adopted (based on research carried out at Caltech in collaboration with Stanford University and the United States Coast and Geodetic Survey, which started in 1937). The concept of "response spectra" was developed in the 1930s, but it wasn't until 1952 that a joint committee of the San Francisco Section of the ASCE and the Structural Engineers Association of Northern California (SEAONC) proposed using the building period (the inverse of the frequency) to determine lateral forces.

The University of California, Berkeley was an early base for computer-based seismic analysis of structures, led by Professor Ray Clough (who coined the term finite element. Students included Ed Wilson, who went on to write the program SAP in 1970, an early "finite element analysis" program.

Earthquake engineering has developed a lot since the early days, and some of the more complex designs now use special earthquake protective elements either just in the foundation (base isolation) or distributed throughout the structure. Analyzing these types of structures requires specialized explicit finite element computer code, which divides time into very small slices and models the actual physics, much like common video games often have "physics engines". Very large and complex buildings can be modeled in this way (such as the Osaka International Convention Center).

Structural analysis methods can be divided into the following five categories.

== Equivalent static analysis ==
This approach defines a series of forces acting on a building to represent the effect of earthquake ground motion, typically defined by a seismic design response spectrum. It assumes that the building responds in its fundamental mode. For this to be true, the building must be low-rise and must not twist significantly when the ground moves. The response is read from a design response spectrum, given the natural frequency of the building (either calculated or defined by the building code). The applicability of this method is extended in many building codes by applying factors to account for higher buildings with some higher modes, and for low levels of twisting. To account for effects due to "yielding" of the structure, many codes apply modification factors that reduce the design forces (e.g. force reduction factors).

== Response spectrum analysis ==
This approach permits the multiple modes of response of a building to be taken into account (in the frequency domain). This is required in many building codes for all except very simple or very complex structures. The response of a structure can be defined as a combination of many special shapes (modes) that in a vibrating string correspond to the "harmonics". Computer analysis can be used to determine these modes for a structure. For each mode, a response is read from the design spectrum, based on the modal frequency and the modal mass, and they are then combined to provide an estimate of the total response of the structure. In this we have to calculate the magnitude of forces in all directions i.e. X, Y & Z and then see the effects on the building. Combination methods include the following:

- absolute – peak values are added together
- square root of the sum of the squares (SRSS)
- complete quadratic combination (CQC) – a method that is an improvement on SRSS for closely spaced modes

The result of a response spectrum analysis using the response spectrum from a ground motion is typically different from that which would be calculated directly from a linear dynamic analysis using that ground motion directly, since phase information is lost in the process of generating the response spectrum.

In cases where structures are either too irregular, too tall or of significance to a community in disaster response, the response spectrum approach is no longer appropriate, and more complex analysis is often required, such as non-linear static analysis or dynamic analysis.

== Linear dynamic analysis ==
Static procedures are appropriate when higher mode effects are not significant. This is generally true for short, regular buildings. Therefore, for tall buildings, buildings with torsional irregularities, or non-orthogonal systems, a dynamic procedure is required. In the linear dynamic procedure, the building is modelled as a multi-degree-of-freedom (MDOF) system with a linear elastic stiffness matrix and an equivalent viscous damping matrix.

The seismic input is modelled using either modal spectral analysis or time history analysis but in both cases, the corresponding internal forces and displacements are determined using linear elastic analysis. The advantage of these linear dynamic procedures with respect to linear static procedures is that higher modes can be considered. However, they are based on linear elastic response and hence the applicability decreases with increasing nonlinear behaviour, which is approximated by global force reduction factors.

In linear dynamic analysis, the response of the structure to ground motion is calculated in the time domain, and all phase information is therefore maintained. Only linear properties are assumed. The analytical method can use modal decomposition as a means of reducing the degrees of freedom in the analysis.

== Nonlinear static analysis ==
In general, linear procedures are applicable when the structure is expected to remain nearly elastic for the level of ground motion or when the design results in nearly uniform distribution of nonlinear response throughout the structure. As the performance objective of the structure implies greater inelastic demands, the uncertainty with linear procedures increases to a point that requires a high level of conservatism in demand assumptions and acceptability criteria to avoid unintended performance. Therefore, procedures incorporating inelastic analysis can reduce the uncertainty and conservatism.

This approach is also known as "pushover" analysis. A pattern of forces is applied to a structural model that includes non-linear properties (such as steel yield), and the total force is plotted against a reference displacement to define a capacity curve. This can then be combined with a demand curve (typically in the form of an acceleration-displacement response spectrum (ADRS)). This essentially reduces the problem to a single degree of freedom (SDOF) system.

Nonlinear static procedures use equivalent SDOF structural models and represent seismic ground motion with response spectra. Story drifts and component actions are related subsequently to the global demand parameter by the pushover or capacity curves that are the basis of the non-linear static procedures.

== Nonlinear dynamic analysis ==
Nonlinear dynamic analysis utilizes the combination of ground motion records with a detailed structural model, therefore is capable of producing results with relatively low uncertainty. In nonlinear dynamic analyses, the detailed structural model subjected to a ground-motion record produces estimates of component deformations for each degree of freedom in the model and the modal responses are combined using schemes such as the square-root-sum-of-squares.

In non-linear dynamic analysis, the non-linear properties of the structure are considered as part of a time domain analysis. This approach is the most rigorous, and is required by some building codes for buildings of unusual configuration or of special importance. However, the calculated response can be very sensitive to the characteristics of the individual ground motion used as seismic input; therefore, several analyses are required using different ground motion records to achieve a reliable estimation of the probabilistic distribution of structural response. Since the properties of the seismic response depend on the intensity, or severity, of the seismic shaking, a comprehensive assessment calls for numerous nonlinear dynamic analyses at various levels of intensity to represent different possible earthquake scenarios. This has led to the emergence of methods like the incremental dynamic analysis.

== See also ==
- Applied element method
- Earthquake simulation
- Extreme Loading for Structures – seismic analysis software
- Modal analysis using FEM
- OpenSees – analysis software
- Structural dynamics
- Vibration control
