= Engineering Institute =

The Engineering Institute is the research institute of the UNAM in Mexico City which focuses on engineering-related topics. It operates the postgraduate programs of the Faculty of Engineering (UNAM).

It is Mexico's most productive research center for diverse branches of engineering.

The institute's policy has always been to solve general engineering problems, to collaborate with government and private entities to improve the national engineering practice and to supply engineering services. The institute has focused on disseminating the result of its research projects to contribute to the national development and the well-being of society.

== History ==
The institute was created in 1959.

=== Ex-directors ===
January 1956 - January 1959 Fernando Hiriart Balderrama

February 1959 - July 1966 Emilio Rosenblueth Deutsch

August 1966 - June 1970 Roger Díaz de Cossío

June 1970 - June 1974 Daniel Ruiz Fernández

June 1974 - September 1982 Daniel Resendiz Nuñez

September 1982 - February 1991 Luis Esteva Maraboto

February 1991 - April 1991 Roberto Magallanes Negrete (Interino)

April 1991 - May 1999 José Luis Fernández Zayas

May 1999 - April 2003 Francisco José Sánchez Sesms

May 2003 - October 2007 Sergio Manuel Alcocer Martínez de Castro

November 2007 - February 2008 José Alberto Escobar Sánchez (Interino)

February 2008 - Adalberto Noyola Robles

== Staff ==
The staff comprises 93 researchers, 95 academic technicians, 409 scholarship holders at the bachelor's, master's and doctoral levels and 184 clerical workers.

== Facilities ==
The institute is located in Ciudad Universitaria in Mexico City, inside the Faculty of Engineering area.

Its facilities include 13 buildings on the UNAM campus, in Mexico City, occupying 20,000 square metres (220,000 sq ft) in laboratories, cubicles and common areas, along with an auditorium.

== Graduate studies ==
The institute offers graduate programs in engineering, computer science, applied mathematics, or Earth sciences, conjointly with the schools of science and engineering, as well as with the Earth Sciences Institute.
