= Arias intensity =

The Arias intensity (I_{A}) is a measure of the strength of a ground motion. It determines the intensity of shaking by measuring the acceleration of transient seismic waves. It has been found to be a fairly reliable parameter to describe earthquake shaking necessary to trigger landslides. It was proposed by Chilean engineer Arturo Arias in 1970.

It is defined as the time-integral of the square of the ground acceleration:

$I_A = \frac {\pi} {2g} \int_0^{T_d} a (t)^2 dt$ (m/s)

where g is the acceleration due to gravity and T_{d} is the duration of signal above threshold. Theoretically the integral should be infinite.

The Arias Intensity could also alternatively be defined as the sum of all the squared acceleration values from seismic strong motion records.
