= Strong ground motion =

Earthquake shaking

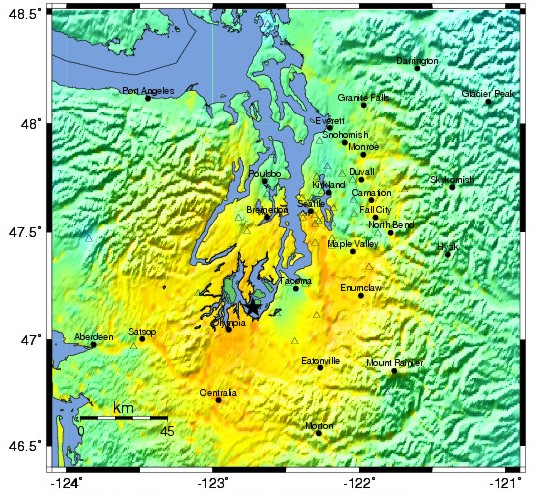
ShakeMap for the 2001 Nisqually earthquake

In seismology, strong ground motion is the strong earthquake shaking that occurs close to (less than about 50 km from) a causative fault. The strength of the shaking involved in strong ground motion usually overwhelms a seismometer, forcing the use of accelerographs (or strong ground motion accelerometers) for recording. The science of strong ground motion also deals with the variations of fault rupture, both in total displacement, energy released, and rupture velocity.

As seismic instruments (and accelerometers in particular) become more common, it becomes necessary to correlate expected damage with instrument-readings. The old Modified Mercalli intensity scale (MM), a relic of the pre-instrument days, remains useful in the sense that each intensity-level provides an observable difference in seismic damage.

After many years of trying every possible manipulation of accelerometer-time histories, it turns out that the extremely simple peak ground velocity (PGV) provides the best correlation with damage. PGV merely expresses the peak of the first integration of the acceleration record. Accepted formulae now link PGV with MM Intensity. Note that the effect of soft soils gets built into the process, since one can expect that these foundation conditions will amplify the PGV significantly.

"ShakeMaps" are produced by the United States Geological Survey, provide almost-real-time information about significant earthquake events, and can assist disaster-relief teams and other agencies.

== Correlation with the Mercalli scale ==
The United States Geological Survey created the Instrumental Intensity scale, which maps peak ground velocity on an intensity scale comparable to the felt Mercalli scale. Seismologists all across the world use these values to construct ShakeMaps.

Instrumental Intensity	Velocity (cm/s)	Perceived shaking	Potential damage
I	< 0.0215	Not felt	None
II–III	0.135 – 1.41	Weak	None
IV	1.41 – 4.65	Light	None
V	4.65 – 9.64	Moderate	Very light
VI	9.64 – 20	Strong	Light
VII	20 – 41.4	Very strong	Moderate
VIII	41.4 – 85.8	Severe	Moderate to heavy
IX	85.8 – 178	Violent	Heavy
X+	> 178	Extreme	Very heavy

== Notable earthquakes ==
PGV (max recorded)	Mag	Depth	Fatalities	Earthquake
318 cm/s	7.7	33 km	2,415	1999 Jiji earthquake
215 cm/s	7.8	10 km	62,013	2023 Turkey-Syria Earthquakes
183 cm/s	6.7	18.2 km	57	1994 Northridge earthquake
170 cm/s	6.9	17.6 km	6,434	1995 Great Hanshin earthquake
152 cm/s	6.6	10 km	11	2007 Chūetsu offshore earthquake
147 cm/s	7.3	1.09 km	3	1992 Landers earthquake
145 cm/s	6.6	13 km	68	2004 Chūetsu earthquake
138 cm/s	7.2	10.5 km	356 injured	1992 Cape Mendocino earthquakes
117.41 cm/s	9.1	29 km	19,747	2011 Tohoku earthquake and tsunami
108 cm/s	7.8	8.2 km	8,857	April 2015 Nepal earthquake
38 cm/s	5.5	15.5 km	0	2008 Chino Hills earthquake
20 cm/s (est)	6.4	10 km	115-120	1933 Long Beach earthquake

== See also ==
- Arias intensity
- Long period ground motion
- Peak ground acceleration
