= Spectral acceleration =

Unit for measuring earthquakes

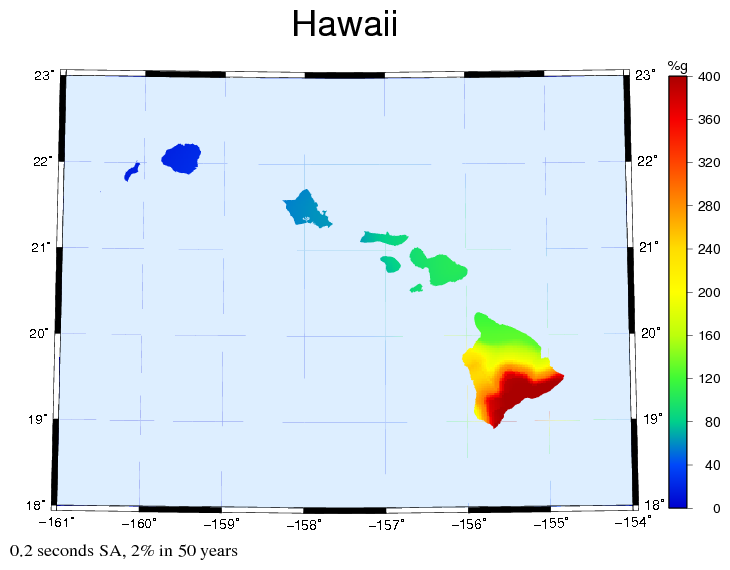
Ground motion hazard map for Hawaii, based on a 2% probability of exceeding 0.2 second spectral acceleration at 5 Hz in 50 years

Spectral acceleration (SA) is a unit measured in g (the acceleration due to Earth's gravity, equivalent to g-force) that describes the maximum acceleration in an earthquake on an object – specifically a damped, harmonic oscillator moving in one physical dimension. This can be measured at (or specified for) different oscillation frequencies and with different degrees of damping, although 5% damping is commonly applied. The SA at different frequencies may be plotted to form a response spectrum.

Spectral acceleration, with a value related to the natural frequency of vibration of the building, is used in earthquake engineering and gives a closer approximation to the motion of a building or other structure in an earthquake than the peak ground acceleration value, although there is normally a correlation between [short period] SA and PGA.

Some seismic hazard maps are also produced using spectral acceleration.

== See also ==
- Seismic scale
