= Peak ground acceleration =

Maximum ground acceleration during an earthquake at a location

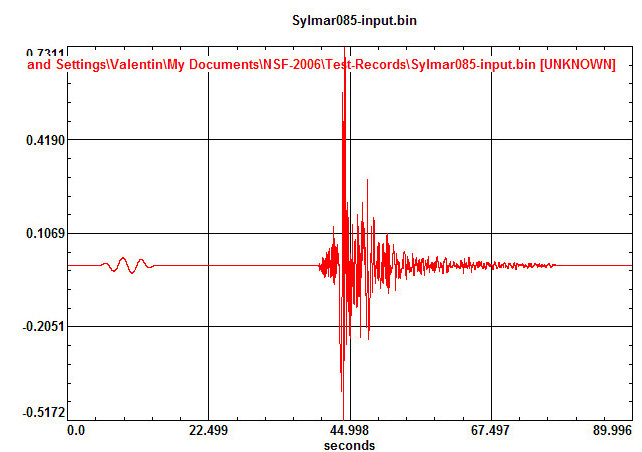
Seismogram of Sylmar085 earthquake in fractions of gravity acceleration

Peak ground acceleration (PGA) is equal to the maximum ground acceleration that occurred during earthquake shaking at a location. PGA is equal to the amplitude of the largest absolute acceleration recorded on an accelerogram at a site during a particular earthquake. Earthquake shaking generally occurs in all three directions. Therefore, PGA is often split into the horizontal and vertical components. Horizontal PGAs are generally larger than those in the vertical direction but this is not always true, especially close to large earthquakes. PGA is an important parameter (also known as an intensity measure) for earthquake engineering, The design basis earthquake ground motion (DBEGM) is often defined in terms of PGA.

Unlike the Richter and moment magnitude scales, it is not a measure of the total energy (magnitude, or size) of an earthquake, but rather of how much the earth shakes at a given geographic point. The Mercalli intensity scale uses personal reports and observations to measure earthquake intensity but PGA is measured by instruments, such as accelerographs. It can be correlated to macroseismic intensities on the Mercalli scale but these correlations are associated with large uncertainty.

The peak horizontal acceleration (PHA) is the most commonly used type of ground acceleration in engineering applications. It is often used within earthquake engineering (including seismic building codes) and it is commonly plotted on seismic hazard maps. In an earthquake, damage to buildings and infrastructure is related more closely to ground motion, of which PGA is a measure, rather than the magnitude of the earthquake itself. For moderate earthquakes, PGA is a reasonably good determinant of damage; in severe earthquakes, damage is more often correlated with peak ground velocity.

== Geophysics ==
Earthquake energy is dispersed in waves from the hypocentre, causing ground movement omnidirectionally but typically modelled horizontally (in two directions) and vertically. PGA records the acceleration (rate of change of speed) of these movements, while peak ground velocity is the greatest speed (rate of movement) reached by the ground, and peak displacement is the distance moved. These values vary in different earthquakes, and in differing sites within one earthquake event, depending on a number of factors. These include the length of the fault, magnitude, the depth of the quake, the distance from the epicentre, the duration (length of the shake cycle), and the geology of the ground (subsurface). Shallow-focused earthquakes generate stronger shaking (acceleration) than intermediate and deep quakes, since the energy is released closer to the surface.

Peak ground acceleration can be expressed in fractions of g (the standard acceleration due to Earth's gravity, equivalent to g-force) as either a decimal or percentage; in m/s^{2} (1 g = 9.81 m/s^{2}); or in multiples of Gal, where 1 Gal is equal to 0.01 m/s^{2} (1 g = 981 Gal).

The ground type can significantly influence ground acceleration, so PGA values can display extreme variability over distances of a few kilometers, particularly with moderate to large earthquakes. The varying PGA results from an earthquake can be displayed on a shake map. Due to the complex conditions affecting PGA, earthquakes of similar magnitude can offer disparate results, with many moderate magnitude earthquakes generating significantly larger PGA values than larger magnitude quakes.

During an earthquake, ground acceleration is measured in three directions: vertically (V or UD, for up-down) and two perpendicular horizontal directions (H1 and H2), often north–south (NS) and east–west (EW). The peak acceleration in each of these directions is recorded, with the highest individual value often reported. Alternatively, a combined value for a given station can be noted. The peak horizontal ground acceleration (PHA or PHGA) can be reached by selecting the higher individual recording, taking the mean of the two values, or calculating a vector sum of the two components. A three-component value can also be reached, by taking the vertical component into consideration also.

In seismic engineering, the effective peak acceleration (EPA, the maximum ground acceleration to which a building responds) is often used, which tends to be 2/3 – 3/4 the PGA.

== Seismic risk and engineering ==
Study of geographic areas combined with an assessment of historical earthquakes allows geologists to determine seismic risk and to create seismic hazard maps, which show the likely PGA values to be experienced in a region during an earthquake, with a probability of exceedance (PE). Seismic engineers and government planning departments use these values to determine the appropriate earthquake loading for buildings in each zone, with key identified structures (such as hospitals, bridges, power plants) needing to survive the maximum considered earthquake (MCE).

Damage to buildings is related to both peak ground velocity (PGV) and the duration of the earthquake – the longer high-level shaking persists, the greater the likelihood of damage.

== Comparison of instrumental and felt intensity ==
Peak ground acceleration provides a measurement of instrumental intensity, that is, ground shaking recorded by seismic instruments. Other intensity scales measure felt intensity, based on eyewitness reports, felt shaking, and observed damage. There is correlation between these scales, but not always absolute agreement since experiences and damage can be affected by many other factors, including the quality of earthquake engineering.

Generally speaking,

- 0.001 g (0.01 m/s^{2} (0.033 ft/s^{2})) – perceptible by people
- 0.02 g (0.2 m/s^{2} (0.66 ft/s^{2})) – people lose their balance
- 0.50 g (5 m/s^{2} (16 ft/s^{2})) – very high; well-designed buildings can survive if the duration is short.

=== Correlation with the Mercalli scale ===
The United States Geological Survey developed an Instrumental Intensity scale, which maps peak ground acceleration and peak ground velocity on an intensity scale similar to the felt Mercalli scale. These values are used to create shake maps by seismologists around the world.

| Instrumental Intensity | Acceleration (g) | Velocity (cm/s) | Perceived shaking | Potential damage |
|---|---|---|---|---|
| I | < 0.000464 | < 0.0215 | Not felt | None |
| II–III | 0.000464 – 0.00297 | 0.135 – 1.41 | Weak | None |
| IV | 0.00297 – 0.0276 | 1.41 – 4.65 | Light | None |
| V | 0.0276 – 0.115 | 4.65 – 9.64 | Moderate | Very light |
| VI | 0.115 – 0.215 | 9.64 – 20 | Strong | Light |
| VII | 0.215 – 0.401 | 20 – 41.4 | Very strong | Moderate |
| VIII | 0.401 – 0.747 | 41.4 – 85.8 | Severe | Moderate to heavy |
| IX | 0.747 – 1.39 | 85.8 – 178 | Violent | Heavy |
| X+ | > 1.39 | > 178 | Extreme | Very heavy |

=== Other intensity scales ===
In the 7-class Japan Meteorological Agency seismic intensity scale, the highest intensity, Shindo 7, covers accelerations greater than 4 m/s^{2} (0.41 g).

== PGA hazard risks worldwide ==
In India, areas with expected PGA values higher than 0.36 g are classed as "Zone 5", or "Very High Damage Risk Zone".

== Notable earthquakes ==
| PGA single direction (max recorded) | PGA vector sum (H1, H2, V) (max recorded) | Magnitude M_{w} | Depth | Fatalities | Earthquake |
|---|---|---|---|---|---|
| | 4.36 g | 6.9 | 8 km | 12 | 2008 Iwate–Miyagi Nairiku earthquake |
| 3.23 g | | 7.8 | 15 km | 2 | 2016 Kaikoura earthquake |
| 2.93 g | 3.54 g | 9.5 | 33 km | 1,000–6,000 | 1960 Valdivia earthquake |
| 2.88 g | | 7.5 | 16 km | 260 | 2024 Noto earthquake |
| 2.7 g | 2.99 g | 9.1 | 30 km | 19,759 | 2011 Tohoku earthquake and tsunami |
| 2.15 g | | 6.0 | 16 km | 0 | 2025 Tainan–Chiayi earthquake |
| 1.92 g | | 7.7 | 8 km | 2,415 | 1999 Jiji earthquake |
| 1.82 g | | 6.7 | 18 km | 57 | 1994 Northridge earthquake |
| 1.62 g | | 7.8 | 10 km | 62,013 | 2023 Turkey–Syria earthquakes |
| 1.52 g | | 7.4 | 40 km | 19 | 2024 Hualien earthquake |
| 1.51 g | | 6.2 | 5 km | 185 | February 2011 Christchurch earthquake |
| 1.26 g | | 7.1 | 10 km | 2 | 2010 Canterbury earthquake |
| 1.25 g | | 6.6 | 8.4 km | 58–65 | 1971 Sylmar earthquake |
| 1.04 g | | 6.6 | 10 km | 11 | 2007 Chūetsu offshore earthquake |
| 0.98 g | | 7.0 | 16.1 km | 118 | 2020 Aegean Sea earthquake |
| 0.91 g | | 6.9 | 17.6 km | 5,502–6,434 | 1995 Great Hanshin earthquake |
| 0.8 g | | 7.2 | 12 km | 222 | 2013 Bohol earthquake |
| 0.65 | | 6.9 | 19 km | 63 | 1989 Loma Prieta earthquake |
| 0.5 g | | 7.0 | 13 km | 100,000–316,000 | 2010 Haiti earthquake |
| 0.34 g | | 6.4 | 15 km | 5,778 | 2006 Yogyakarta earthquake |
| 0.18 g | | 9.2 | 25 km | 131 | 1964 Alaska earthquake |

== See also ==
- Earthquake simulation
- Japan Meteorological Agency seismic intensity scale
- Spectral acceleration

== Bibliography ==
- Murphy, J.R.; o'brien (1977). "The correlation of peak ground acceleration amplitude with seismic intensity and other physical parameters". Bulletin of the Seismological Society of America. 67 (3): 877–915. Bibcode:1977BuSSA..67..877M. doi:10.1785/BSSA0670030877. S2CID 129134843.
- Campbell, K.W. (1997). "Empirical near-source attenuation relationships for horizontal and vertical components of peak ground acceleration, peak ground velocity, and pseudo-absolute acceleration response spectra". Seismological Research Letters. 68 (1): 154–179. Bibcode:1997SeiRL..68..154C. doi:10.1785/gssrl.68.1.154.
- Campbell, K.W.; Y. Bozorgnia (2003). "Updated near-source ground-motion (attenuation) relations for the horizontal and vertical components of peak ground acceleration and acceleration response spectra" (PDF). Bulletin of the Seismological Society of America. 93 (1): 314–331. Bibcode:2003BuSSA..93..314C. doi:10.1785/0120020029.
- Wald, D.J.; V. Quitoriano; T.H. Heaton; H. Kanamori (1999). "Relationships between peak ground acceleration, peak ground velocity, and modified Mercalli intensity in California". Earthquake Spectra. 15 (3): 557. Bibcode:1999EarSp..15..557W. doi:10.1193/1.1586058. S2CID 110698014.
