= Irma Gonzalez =

Irma Gonzalez may refer to:

- Irma González (wrestler) (born 1936), Mexican luchadora
- Irma Elsa Gonzalez (born 1948), United States federal judge
