= Cynthia Bashant =

American judge (born 1960)

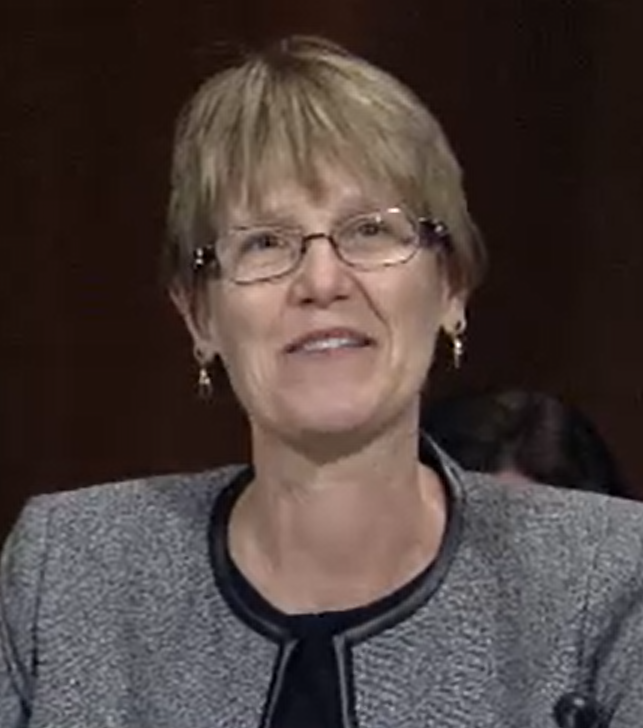

Chief Judge of the United States District Court for the Southern District of California
- Incumbent
- Assumed office January 22, 2025
- Preceded by: Dana Sabraw

Judge of the United States District Court for the Southern District of California
- Incumbent
- Assumed office May 8, 2014
- Appointed by: Barack Obama
- Preceded by: Irma Elsa Gonzalez

Personal details
- Born: Cynthia Ann Bashant; March 18, 1960 (age 65) San Francisco, California, U.S.
- Political party: Democratic
- Education: Smith College (BA); University of California, Hastings (JD)

Cynthia Ann Bashant (born March 18, 1960) is the chief United States district judge for the United States District Court for the Southern District of California and former judge of the San Diego County Superior Court.

== Early life and education ==
Bashant was born in 1960 in San Francisco. She received an Artium Baccalaureus degree in 1982 from Smith College and a Juris Doctor in 1986 from the University of California, Hastings College of Law.

== Career ==
Bashant began her career in private practice in San Diego, as an associate at MacDonald, Halsted & Laybourne from 1986 to 1988 and then as associate at Baker & McKenzie from 1988 to 1989, practicing civil litigation at both firms. Bashant served as an assistant United States attorney in the Southern District of California from 1989 to 2000. She served as deputy chief of narcotics from 1995 to 1997 and chief of border crimes from 1997 to 1998. In these positions, Bashant prosecuted crimes involving Mexican drug cartels and methamphetamine labs.

=== State and federal judicial service ===
From 2000 until 2014, Bashant served as a judge of the San Diego County Superior Court, handling both criminal and juvenile matters. From 2009 to 2012, she was the presiding judge for the juvenile dependency and delinquency courts.

On September 19, 2013, President Barack Obama nominated Bashant to serve as a United States district judge of the United States District Court for the Southern District of California, to the seat vacated by Judge Irma Elsa Gonzalez, who assumed senior status on March 29, 2013. On January 16, 2014 her nomination was reported out of the Senate Judiciary Committee. On April 11, 2014 Senate Majority Leader Reid filed a motion to invoke cloture on the nomination. On April 29, 2014 a vote on the motion to invoke cloture on the nomination was agreed to by a 56–41 vote. On April 30, 2014 the nomination was confirmed by a 94–0 vote. She received her judicial commission on May 8, 2014. She became the chief judge on January 22, 2025.

Legal offices
Preceded by Irma Elsa Gonzalez	Judge of the United States District Court for the Southern District of California; 2014–present	Incumbent
Preceded by Dana Sabraw	Chief Judge of the United States District Court for the Southern District of California; 2025–present	Incumbent
