= 1933 Long Beach earthquake =

Severe earthquake in Los Angeles County, California

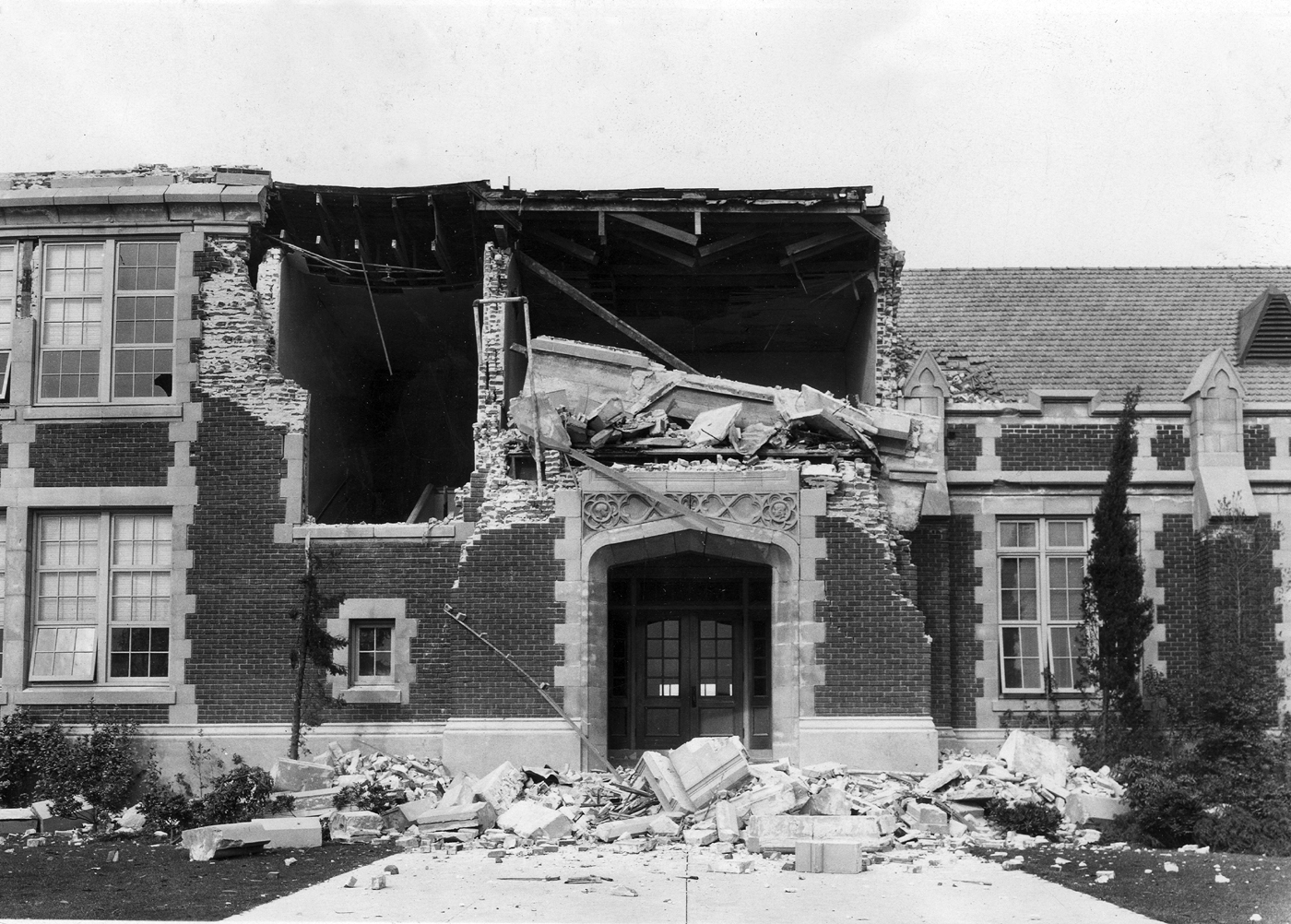
- Damage to the John Muir School, Pacific Avenue, Long Beach

- UTC time: 1933-03-11 01:54:00
- ISC event: 905457
- USGS-ANSS: ComCat
- Local date: March 10, 1933
- Local time: 5:54 P.M. PST
- Magnitude: 6.4 M_{w}
- Depth: 10 km (6.2 mi)
- Epicenter: 33.631°N 118.000°W
- Fault: Newport-Inglewood Fault
- Type: Strike-slip
- Areas affected: South Coast (California); United States
- Total damage: $40 million
- Max. intensity: MMI VIII (Severe)
- Peak acceleration: 0.22 g
- Peak velocity: 20 cm/s (est)
- Tsunami: No
- Aftershocks: M5.4 on Oct 2 1933
- Casualties: 115–120 killed

The 1933 Long Beach earthquake took place on March 10 at 5:54 P.M. PST south of downtown Los Angeles. The epicenter was offshore, southeast of Long Beach, California, on the Newport–Inglewood Fault. The earthquake had a magnitude estimated at 6.4 M_{w}, and a maximum Mercalli intensity of VIII (Severe). Damage to buildings was widespread throughout Southern California. It resulted in 115 to 120 fatalities and an estimated $40 million worth of property damage, equivalent to $995 million in 2025. The majority of the fatalities resulted from people running out of buildings, exposing themselves to the falling debris.

== Tectonic setting ==
The Newport–Inglewood Fault is a right-lateral strike-slip fault trending northwest–southeast, and parallel to other major right-lateral faults in California. The fault spans about 46 miles through the Los Angeles Basin, onshore from Culver City to Newport Beach, where it extends east-southeast into the Pacific Ocean and becomes the Rose Canyon Fault. The fault can be identified on the surface by a chain of low hills extending from Culver City to Signal Hill. The fault has a slip rate of approximately 0.6 mm (0.024 in)/year and is predicted to be capable of a 6.0–7.4 magnitude earthquake.

The Newport–Inglewood Fault is part of the larger system of right-lateral strike-slip faults, most prominently the San Andreas Fault, which comprises the transform zone that separates the North American tectonic plate from the Pacific plate.

== Earthquake ==
The 1933 Long Beach earthquake took place on March 10 at 5:54 P.M. PST with an estimated magnitude of 6.4 M_{w}, and a maximum Mercalli intensity of VIII (Severe). The epicenter of the quake was offshore, 3 miles south of Huntington Beach. The earthquake ruptured 15 miles towards the north, although it did not rupture at the surface. The shaking was especially strong in the cities of Long Beach and Compton.

== Damage ==
Major damage occurred in the densely populated city of Long Beach on the south-facing coast of Los Angeles County. However, the damage was also found in the industrial area south of downtown Los Angeles. An estimated 75,000 mi^{2} area was impacted, and the earthquake was felt as far away as San Joaquin Valley, Owens Valley, and Northern Baja California.

A significant amount of damage occurred due to unfavorable geological conditions (landfill, water-soaked alluvium) combined with poorly constructed buildings. In Long Beach, buildings collapsed, water tanks fell through roofs, and houses were tossed off their foundations. School buildings were among the structures that incurred the most severe damage. Within seconds, 120 schools within the Long Beach area were damaged, 70 of which were destroyed. It was recognized that unreinforced masonry bearing walls were the reason that school buildings suffered so much damage.

On March 20, 2008, a Los Angeles Times article stated that "the 1933 quake changed the landscape, leading to improved school construction standards and a heightened awareness of earthquake risks." Among other buildings, the La Grande Station, the main Los Angeles terminal of the Atchison, Topeka, and Santa Fe Railroad, was heavily damaged.

== Aftermath ==
The earthquake highlighted the need for earthquake-resistant design for structures in California. More than 230 school buildings either were destroyed, suffered major damage, or were judged unsafe to occupy. Casualties would have been much higher had the earthquake occurred a few hours earlier while school was in session. Many schools were permanently closed for a long time due to the building being unsafe for inhabitation or not meeting earthquake safety regulations at the time. Since these schools were deemed unsafe, students would report to classes held in tents. Large sums of money were needed to upgrade these damaged school buildings.

Only 30 days after the earthquake, Governor James Rolph Jr. signed the Field Act to govern the planning, design and construction of public school buildings. The Field Act mandated that building designs be based on high-level building standards adopted by the state and enforced by independent plan review and inspection. The plans and specifications must be prepared by competent designers qualified through state registration.

A group of local scientists, architects, and builders formed a Joint Technical Committee on Earthquake Protection to propose ways to minimize loss of life and property in future earthquakes. The committee was chaired by Caltech physicist Robert Millikan, and included architects John C. Austin and Sumner Hunt. In June 1933 they released their report, which advocated for stronger building codes.

The Bureau of Public Roads also took action to rebuild roads, highways, and bridges. The economy of Long Beach was able to return to normal swiftly because of the rise of the aircraft industry. To support the World War II efforts, Long Beach created naval yards and increased the number of aircraft produced. This directly helped Long Beach repair and stabilize the economy after the disaster.

This earthquake prompted the federal government to play an active role in disaster relief. The government created the Reconstruction Finance Corporation, providing loans for reconstructing buildings that were affected during the natural disaster.

The damage to the La Grande Station indirectly led to the construction of Los Angeles Union Station, which was built on top of what was at that time the Chinatown, Los Angeles.

== Cause ==
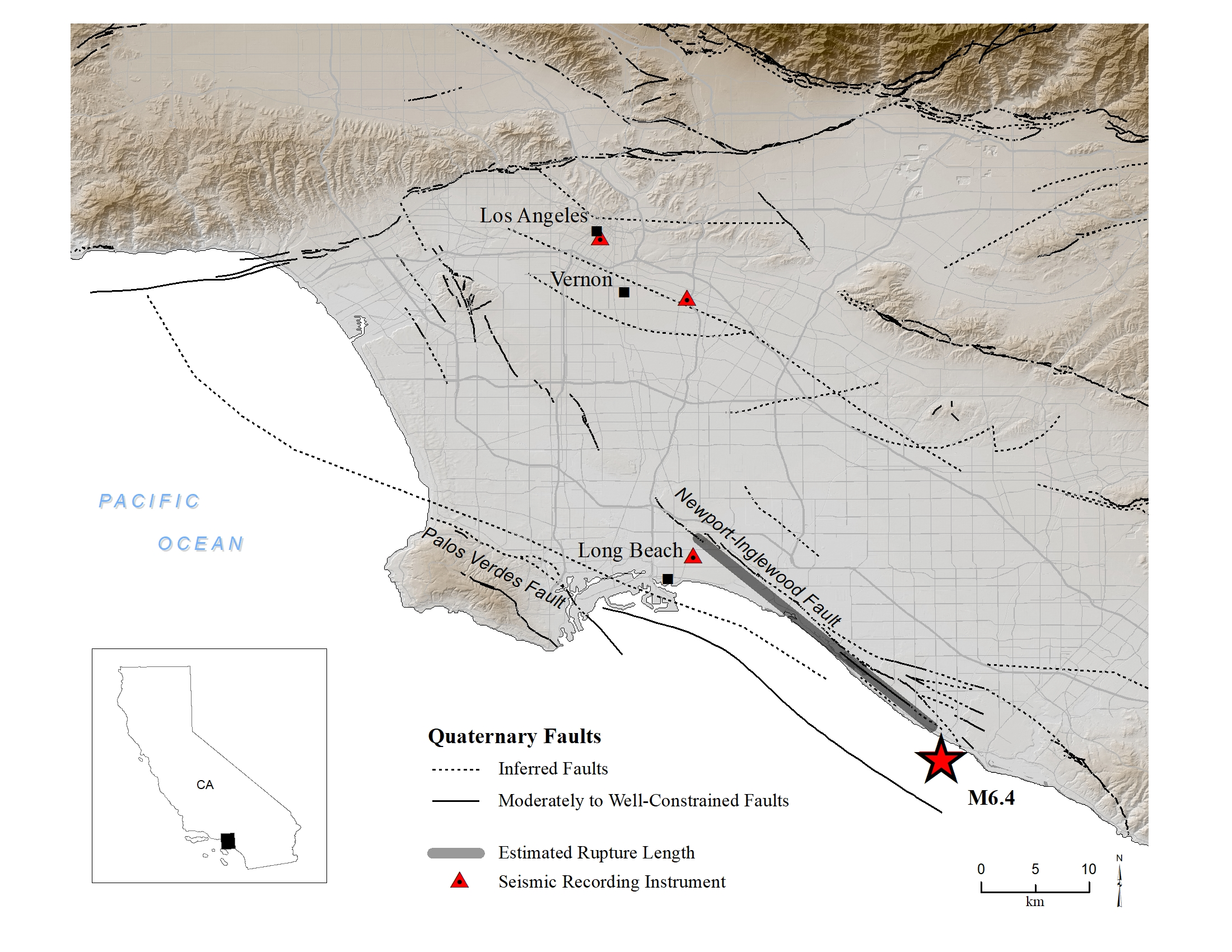
United States Geological Survey map of the greater Los Angeles area, indicating instrumentally determined epicenter of the 1933 Long Beach earthquake (red star), locations of recording instruments (red triangles) that recorded the mainshock, and estimated fault break (thick gray line). The closest instrument, in Long Beach, went off-scale, but the shaking was recorded on-scale by the other two instruments.

A 2016 press release by the United States Geological Survey indicates that research shows the 1933 Long Beach earthquake may have been man-made, caused by oil and gas extraction underneath the city. Further studies indicate that several, if not most earthquakes during the peak years of Los Angeles's oil boom were likely caused by tectonic stress induced by methods used at the time which did not replace the millions of barrels of removed oil with other liquids. A study done by the USGS suggests that drilling in a Huntington Beach area caused the 1933 earthquake. Other studies done by the USGS have also indicated that oil drilling may have been responsible for earthquakes in the surrounding areas in the 1920s. A study published in 2016 by two scientists who reviewed early state oil drilling records found that the epicenters of these earthquakes were located near areas where an oil well that wasn't producing much petroleum was drilled much deeper. Man-made earthquakes are still an issue, especially in Oklahoma and Texas. Recent studies have shown that the injection of wastewater into the ground increases the occurrence of earthquakes.

Within the Los Angeles depositional basin, northwest-trending groups of faulted anticlines were viewed to be caused by oil and gas extraction underneath the city. The extraction of oil and gas produces salty water, adding stress to faults, causing earthquakes. Often wastewater and natural gas production will increase the magnitude of the earthquake making them even more dangerous.

== Appearances in documentaries and popular culture ==
- Quake! Its Effect on Long Beach and Compton California is a 1933 short film by Guy D. Haselton that documents the earthquake.
- When The Earth Trembled is a 1933 Pathé News documentary report on the quake.
- The Southern California Earthquake contains archival 1933 footage of the damage.
- Violent Earthquake Brings Desolation To California is a 1933 British Movietone News report on the earthquake
- Headline Shooter, a 1933 drama about newsreel photographers starring William Gargan, Frances Dee, and Ralph Bellamy contains newsreel footage of the earthquake.
- The Long Beach earthquake provides the climax to the 1934 William Wellman film Looking For Trouble, starring Spencer Tracy, Jack Oakie, and Constance Cummings; actual newsreel footage of ruined structures is inter-cut with a set that reproduces the scenes of destruction.
- The earthquake is included in John Fante's 1939 novel Ask the Dust, and the earthquake scene in the novel is the subject of a public art installation in Pershing Square called "Hey Day" by Barbara McCarren.
- The earthquake plays a significant part in the novel The Last Tycoon (1941) by F. Scott Fitzgerald. During the disruption caused by the quake, the hero, Monroe Stahr, meets Kathleen Moore, with whom he falls in love.
- The earthquake is mentioned at the start of John Schlesinger's 1975 film The Day of the Locust, when William Atherton's character is being shown his apartment by the landlady.
- Footage of the earthquake appeared in the film Encounter with Disaster, released in 1979 and produced by Sun Classic Pictures.
- The earthquake is mentioned in "Emergency" season 3, episode 2 "The Old Engine" when paramedics of Station 51 buy a junked fire truck that was working in the 1933 earthquake.

== Gallery ==
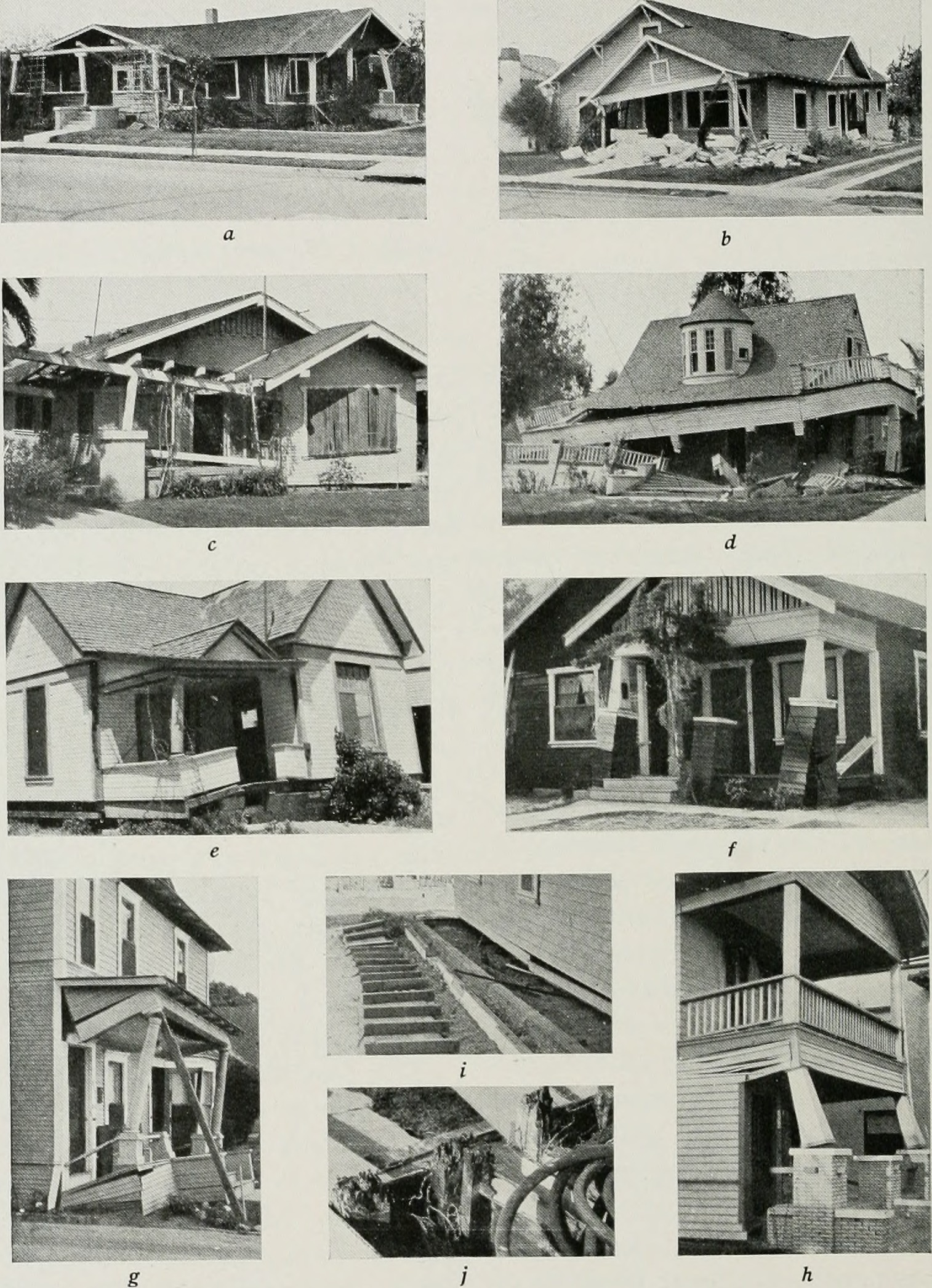
Damaged buildings throughout Long Beach

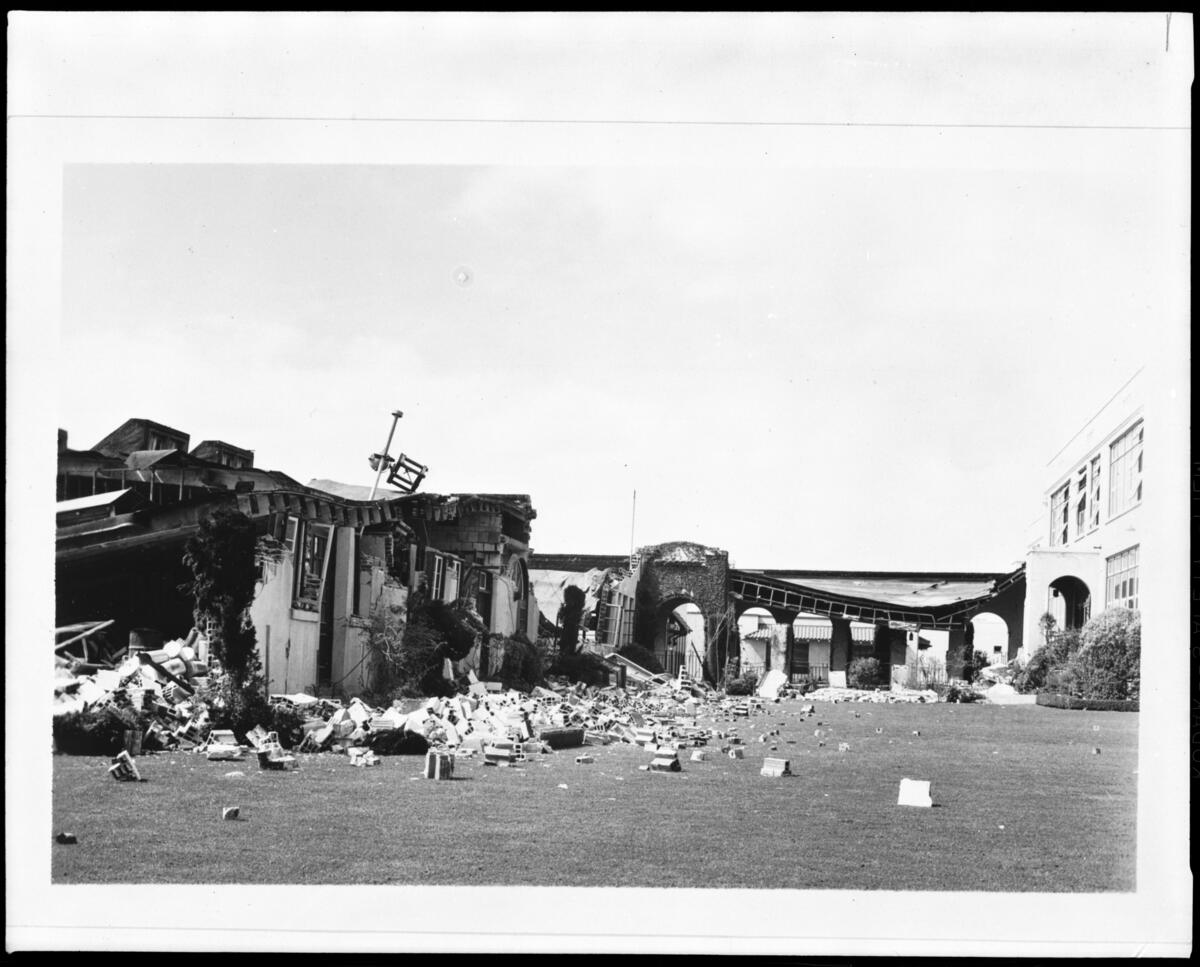
Compton Union High School

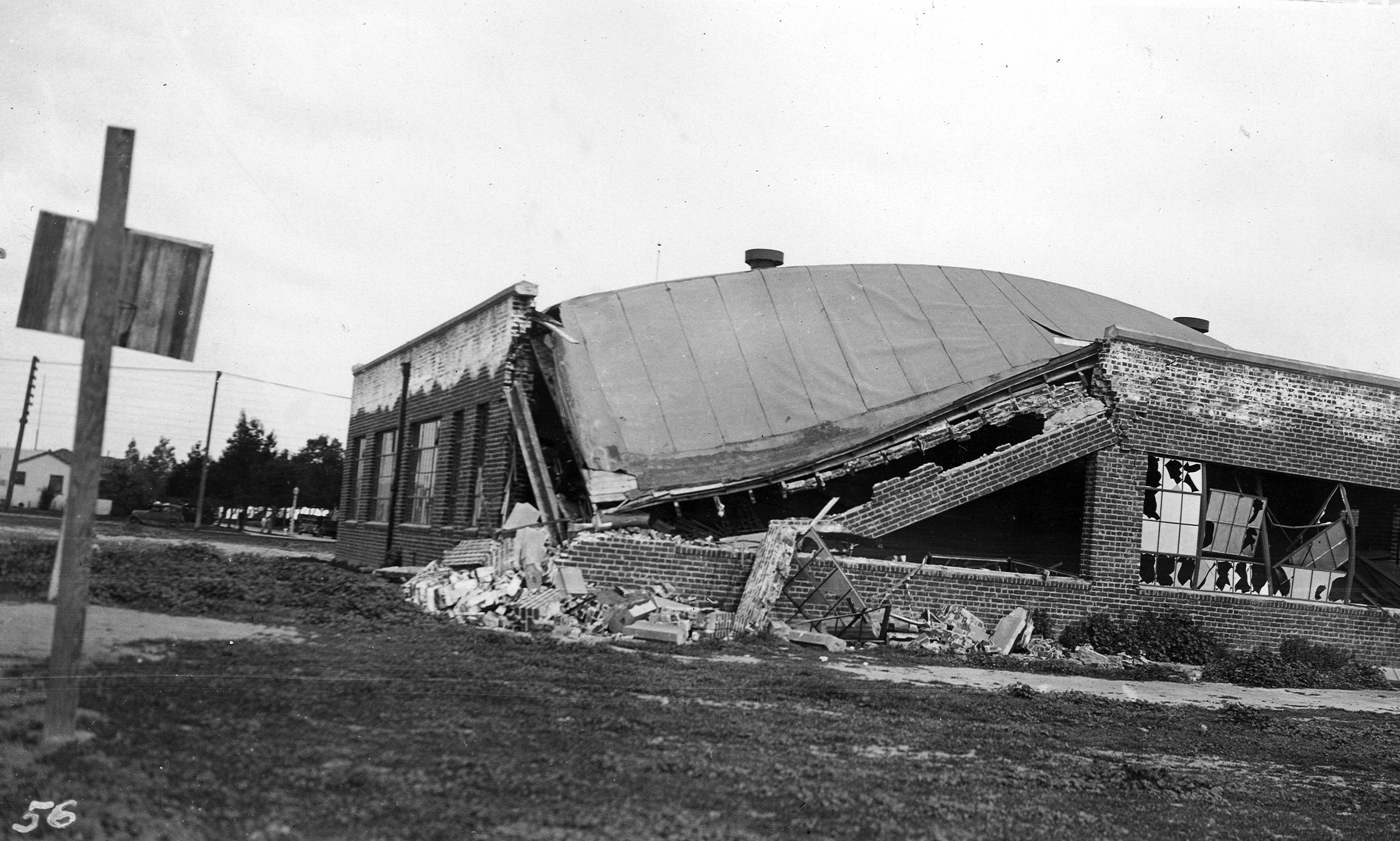
Compton Junior High School

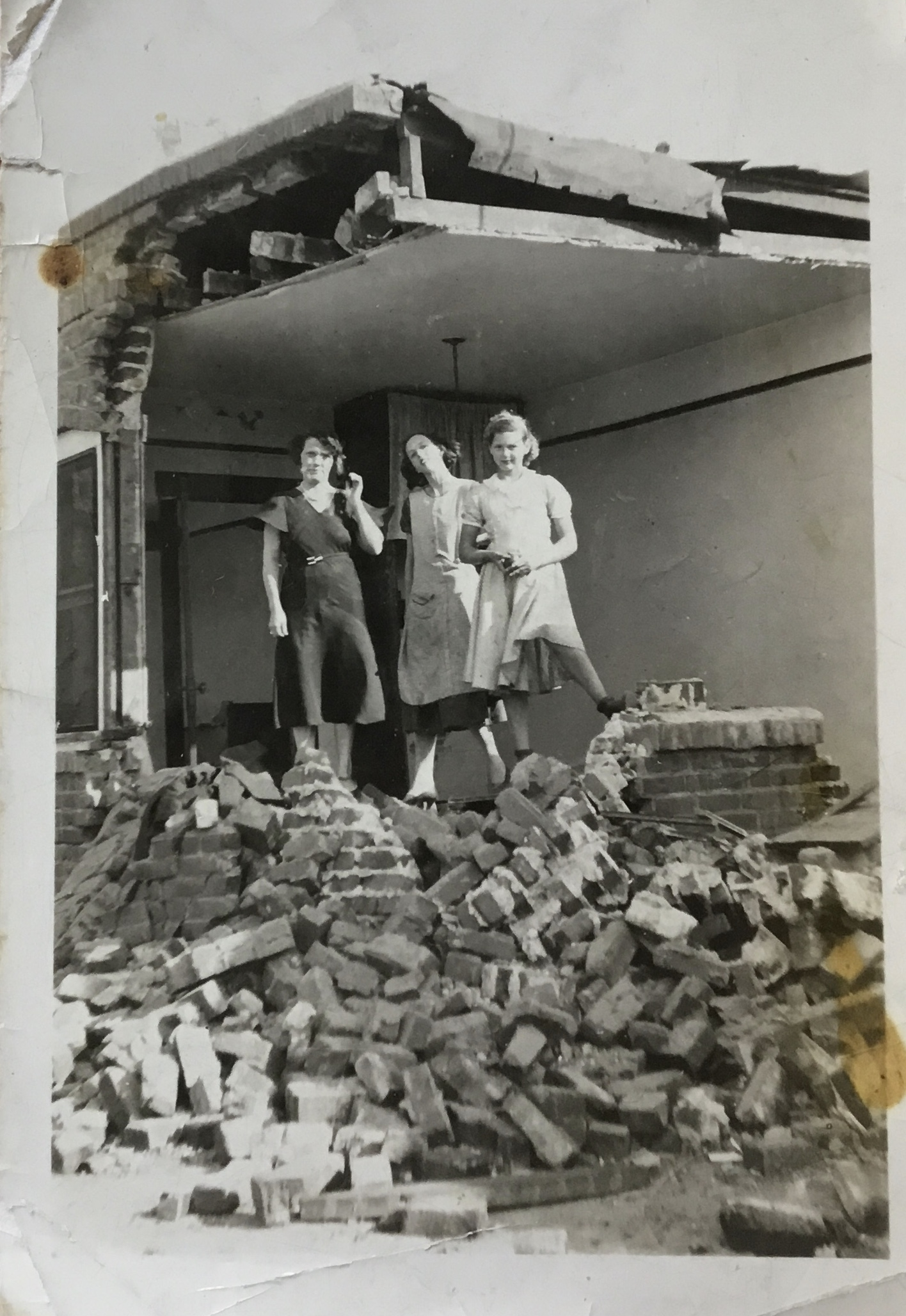
Damage to building in Long Beach

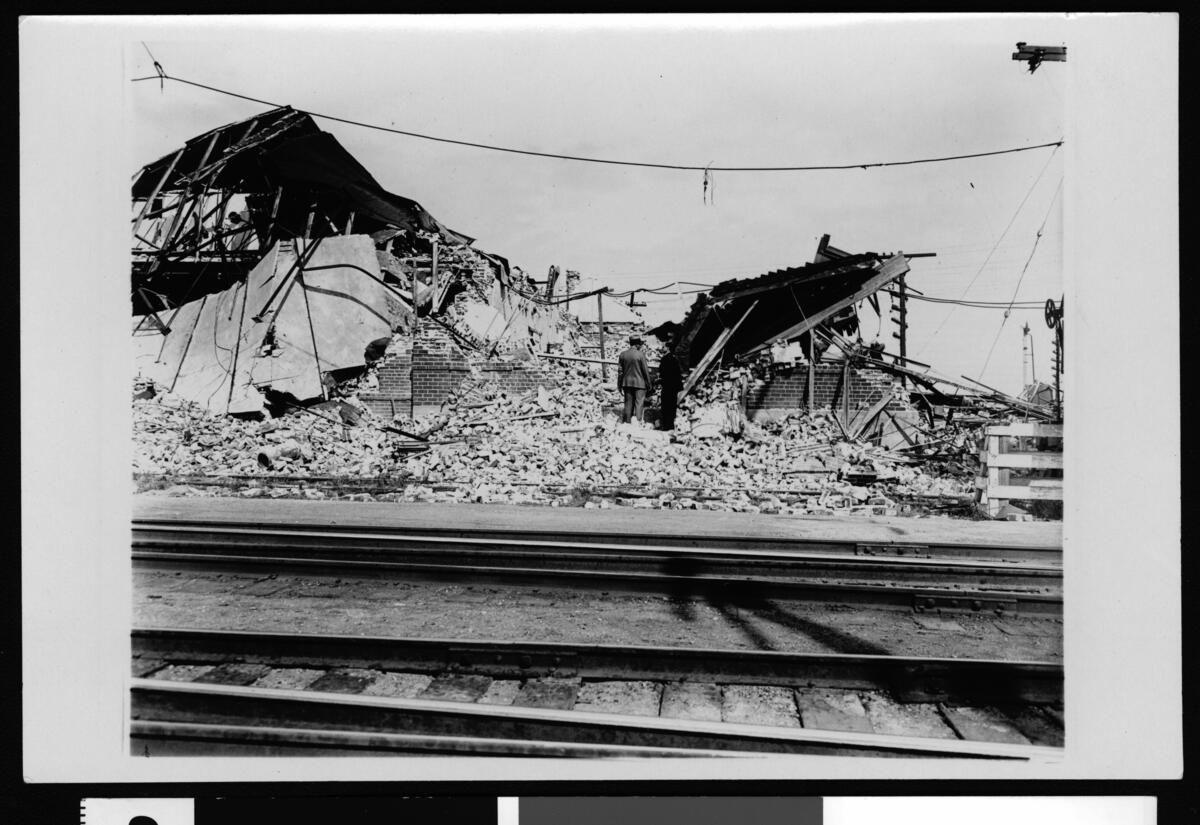
Destroyed building in Huntington Park

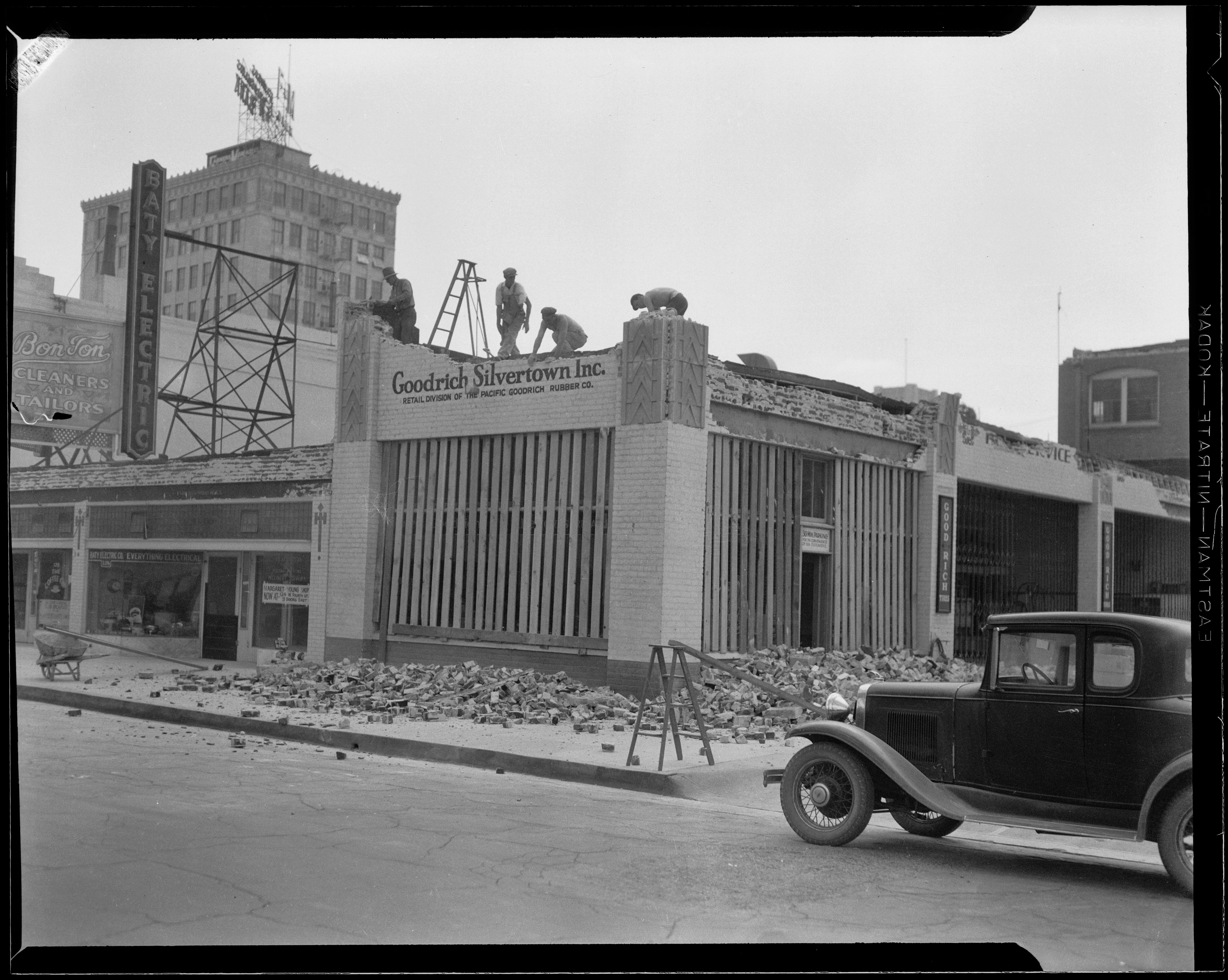
Corner of 4th St. and Pacific Ave., Long Beach

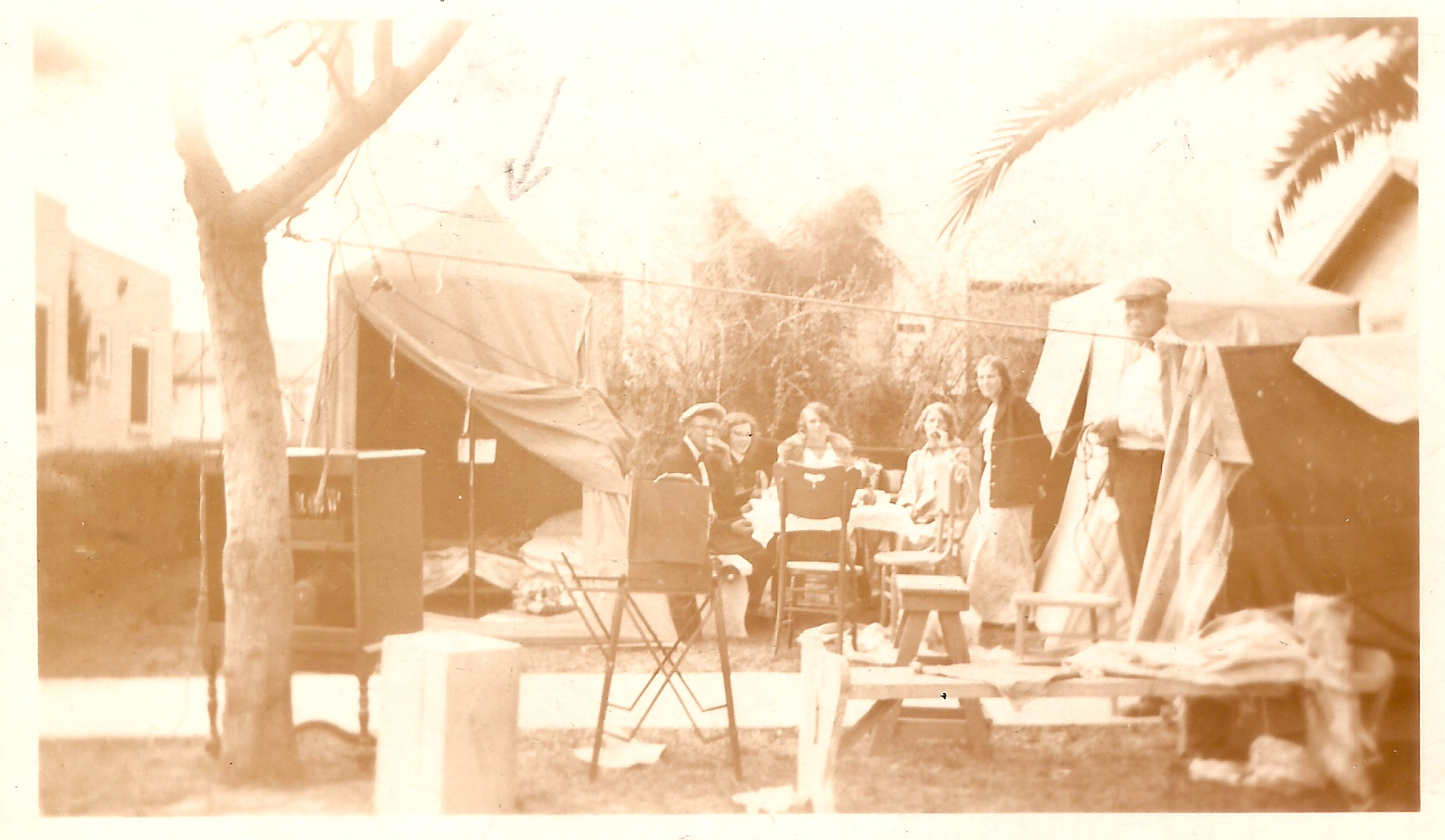
Camping out in South Gate after the earthquake

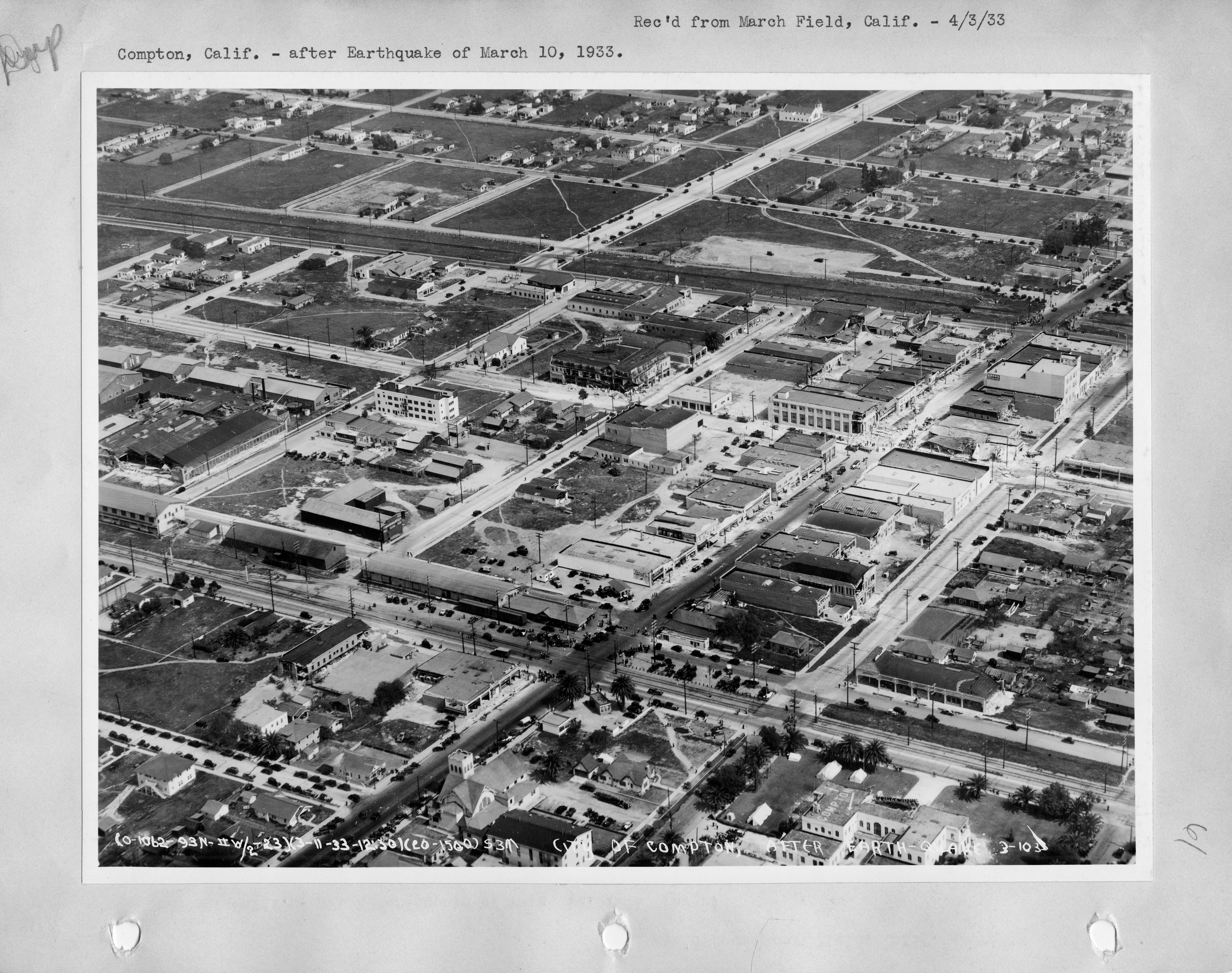
Compton

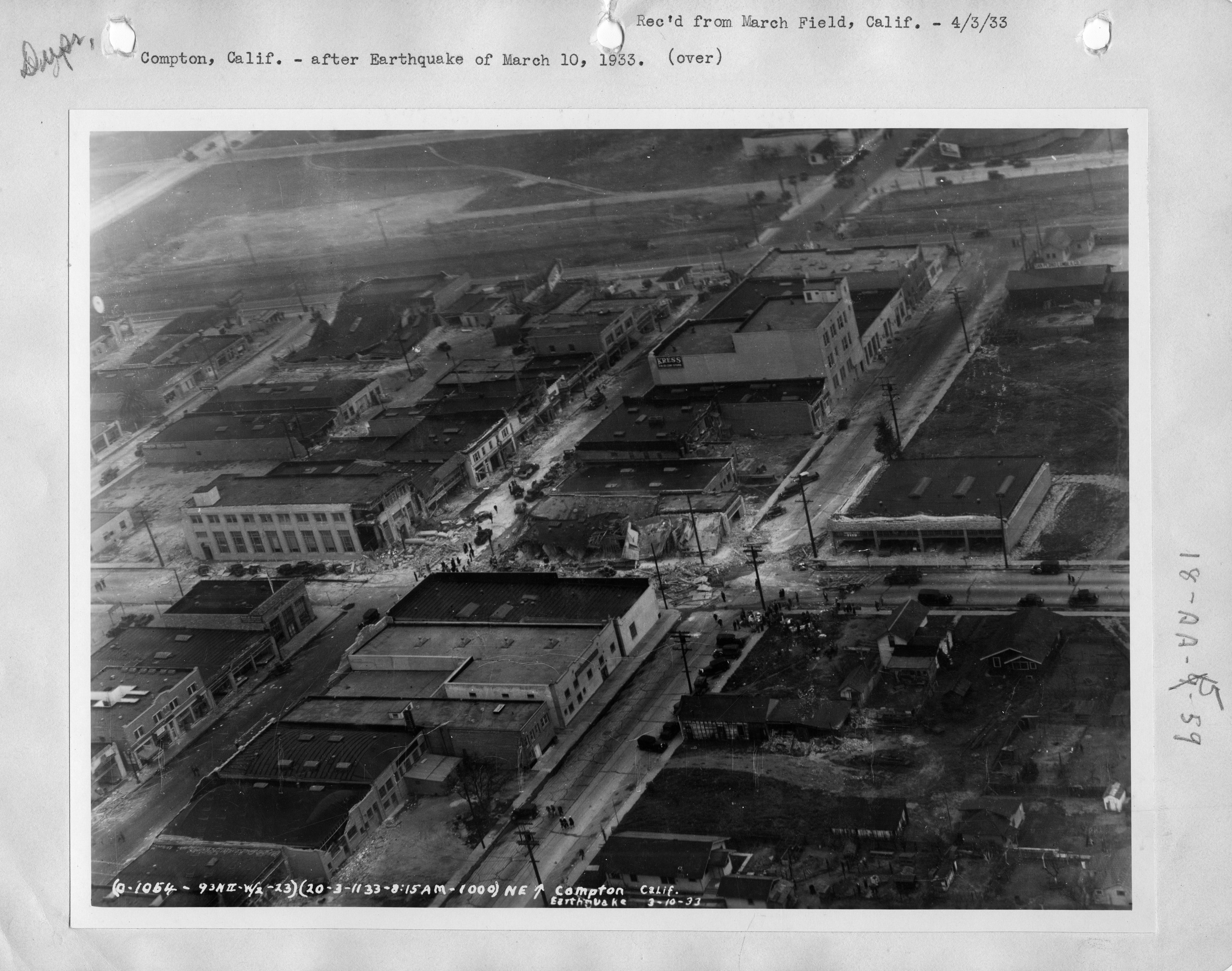
Compton

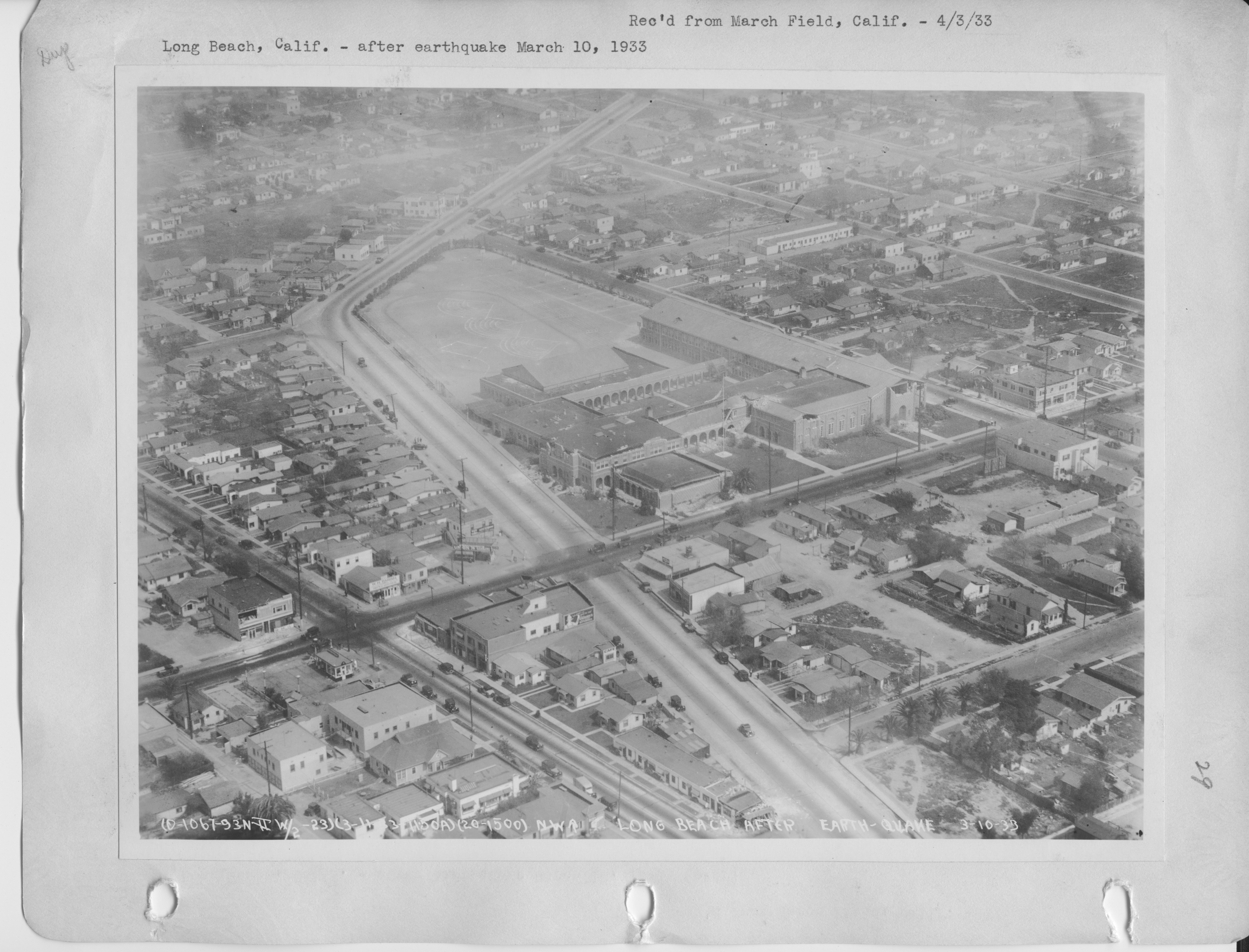
Long Beach

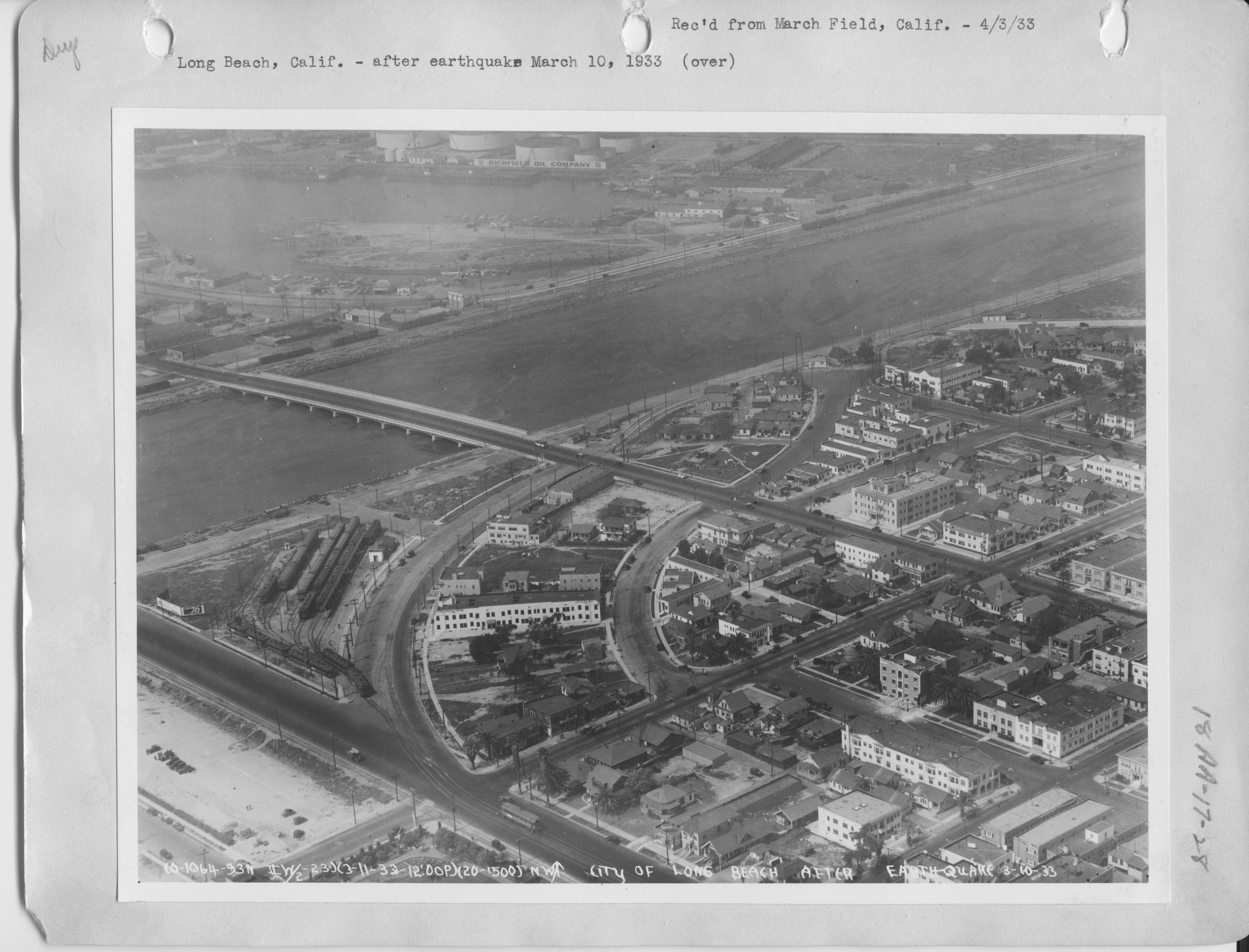
Long Beach

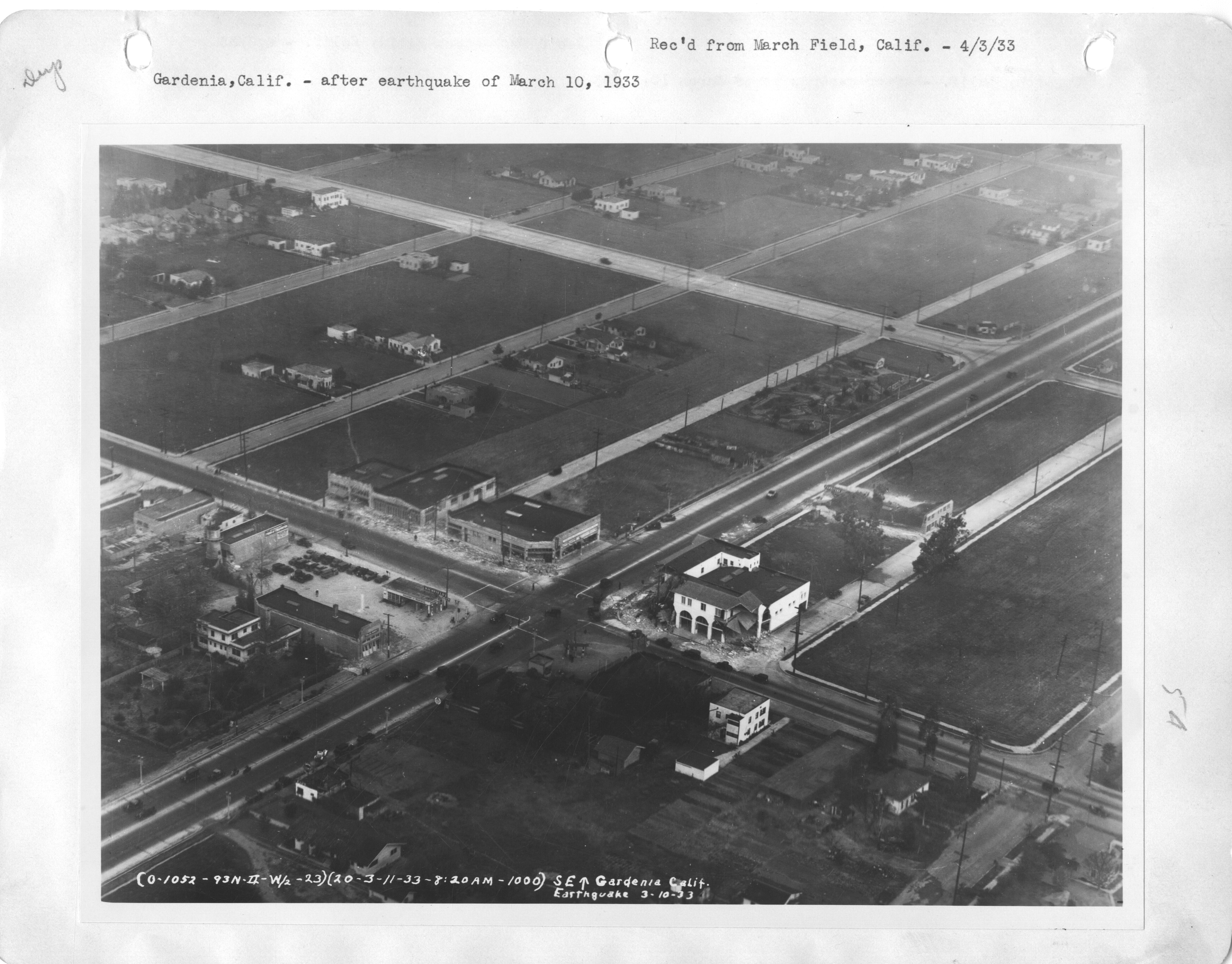
Gardena

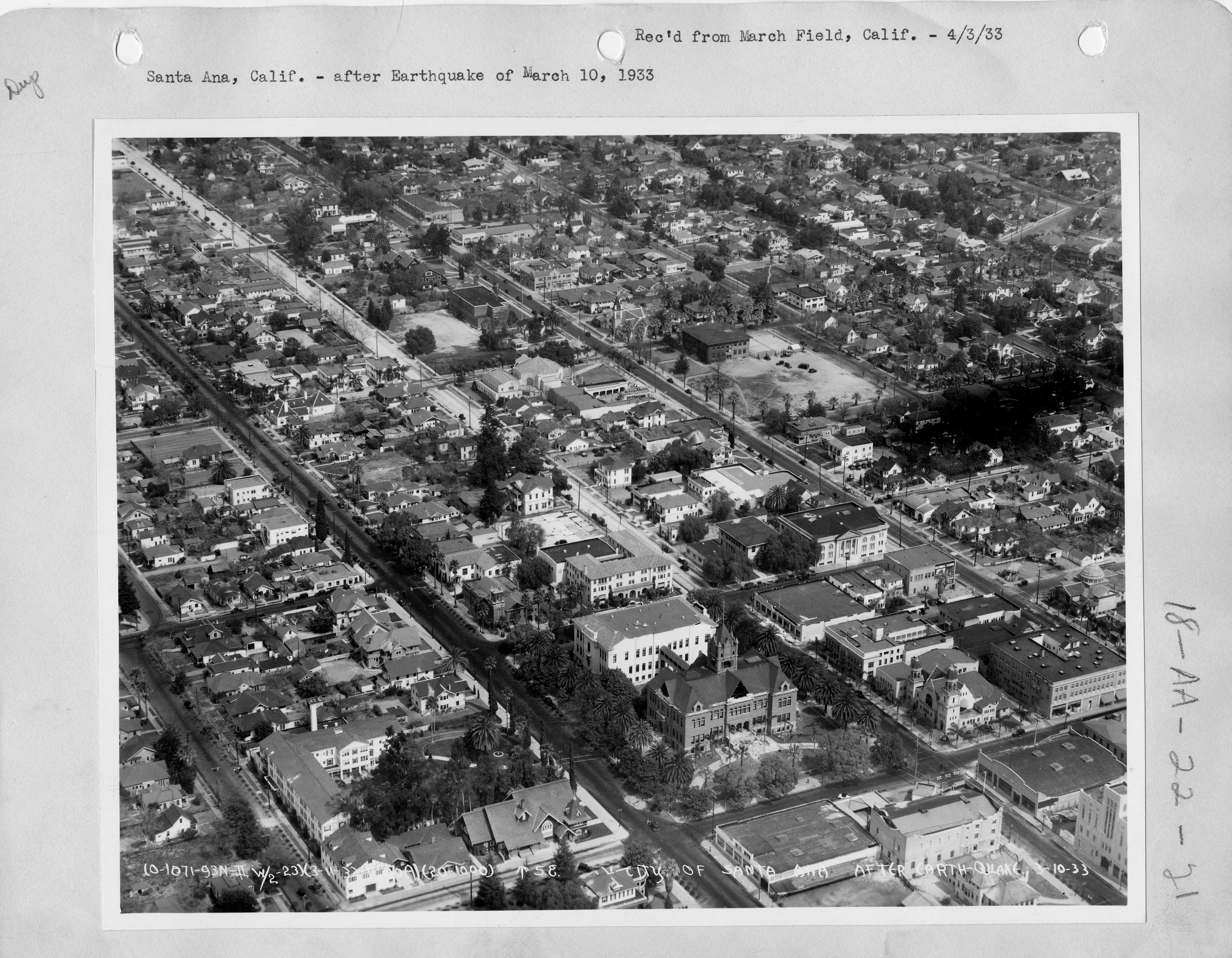
Santa Ana

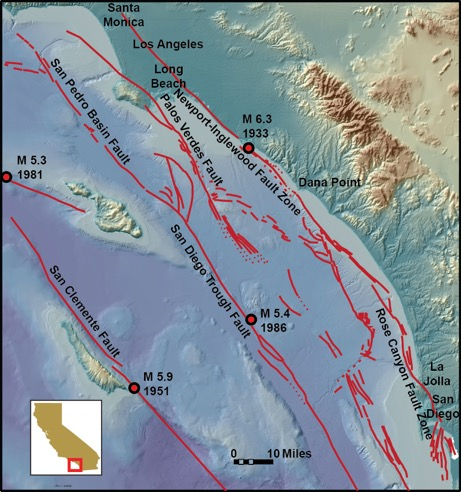
The epicenter and its relative location to offshore faults

== See also ==
- Bibliography of California history
- List of earthquakes in 1933
- List of earthquakes in California
- List of earthquakes in the United States
