= Dana Sabraw =

American judge (born 1958)

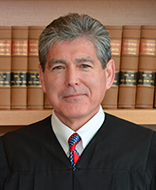

Chief Judge of the United States District Court for the Southern District of California
- In office January 22, 2021 – January 22, 2025
- Preceded by: Larry Alan Burns
- Succeeded by: Cynthia Bashant

Judge of the United States District Court for the Southern District of California
- Incumbent
- Assumed office September 26, 2003
- Appointed by: George W. Bush
- Preceded by: Seat established by 116 Stat. 1758

Judge of the San Diego County Superior Court
- In office November 1998 – September 2003
- Appointed by: Pete Wilson

Judge of the North County Municipal Court, San Diego County, California
- In office October 1995 – November 1998
- Appointed by: Pete Wilson

Personal details
- Born: Dana Makoto Sabraw; July 3, 1958 (age 67) San Rafael, California, U.S.
- Party: Republican
- Spouse: Summer Stephan
- Education: American River Junior College (AA); San Diego State University (BS); University of the Pacific (JD)

Dana Makoto Sabraw (born July 3, 1958) is a United States district judge of the United States District Court for the Southern District of California. He was nominated by President George W. Bush in 2003.

== Early life and education ==
Sabraw is half-Japanese; his Japanese mother met his father in 1954 when he was a United States Army soldier stationed in Japan during the Korean War. They married in 1955. His father was a teacher of special-needs students and his mother taught English as a second language.

Sabraw was born in San Rafael, California in 1958, and grew up in the Sacramento suburb of Carmichael, California. He received an Associate of Arts degree from American River Junior College in 1978, a Bachelor of Science degree from San Diego State University in 1980, and a Juris Doctor from the McGeorge School of Law at University of the Pacific in 1985.

== Career ==
His first job was working as a wrestling instructor, conditioning instructor, and later a lifeguard for the San Juan Unified School District in Carmichael, California From 1976 to 1977.

From 1977 to 1982, he worked at many businesses and colleges which included Westmont and the University of the Pacific.

Sabraw was in private practice for six years at the Santa Barbara law firm of Price, Postel & Parma before joining the San Diego office of the international law firm Baker McKenzie in 1992.

=== State court service ===
Sabraw was a judge on the North County Municipal Court, County of San Diego, from 1995 to 1998. He was a judge on the San Diego County Superior Court from 1998 to 2003. Governor Pete Wilson appointed Sabraw to both posts.

=== Federal judicial service ===
Sabraw was nominated by President George W. Bush on May 1, 2003, to be a United States District Judge of the United States District Court for the Southern District of California, to a new seat created by 116 Stat. 1758.

The American Bar Association's Standing Committee on the Federal Judiciary unanimously rated Sabraw "well qualified" for the judgeship. Sabraw was unanimously confirmed by the United States Senate in a 95-0 vote on September 25, 2003. He received his commission the following day. He was the chief judge from January 22, 2021 until January 22, 2025.

==== Notable cases ====
In 2016 Sabraw presided over a case brought against the State of California by a group of anti-vaccine parents who challenged S.B. 277, a California law that required all schoolchildren in public and private schools to be fully vaccinated against a number of diseases. Sabraw rejected the activists' claim that the law was a violation of the constitutional rights to free exercise of religion or to equal public education, writing that "the fundamental rights under the First Amendment to the United States Constitution do not overcome the State's interest in protecting a child's health" and that the Constitution "does not require the provision of a religious exemption to vaccination requirements, much less a personal belief exemption." After Sabraw rejected the plaintiffs' application for an injunction, the group dropped the lawsuit.

In February 2018, Sabraw was assigned a case in which the American Civil Liberties Union (ACLU) sued the Donald Trump administration on behalf of a Congolese woman who had been separated from her 7-year-old daughter in November when she presented herself at the San Ysidro Port of Entry seeking asylum. The case later became a class-action suit challenging the administration's policy of separating families who cross the U.S.-Mexico border. In June 2018, Sabraw denied the government's motion to dismiss the case, finding that plaintiffs alleged sufficient grounds to proceed with their claim that the policy violates plaintiffs' constitutional right to due process. Later that month, Sabraw entered a nationwide injunction ordering an end to most family separations at the border and requiring the immediate reunification of all children separated from their family members under the policy. He continued to oversee the process of family reunification, requiring regular reports from the administration. In July 2018, Sabraw suspended family deportations for one week, until family unifications could be completed. In August 2018, Sabraw ruled that it is the government's burden to reunite separated migrant families.

However, in January 2020, he ruled in support of the Trump administration's separation of 900 children from their parents on the grounds that the parents were unfit or dangerous, given doubts about paternity, criminal history, or having communicable diseases. He distinguished these cases from those where he had earlier ruled against the Trump administration because their purpose had been to deter immigration across the southern border altogether. In so ruling, he rejected the ACLU's claim that the administration had reverted to previous abusive family separations, although he did also grant the ACLU position that the government would have to administer DNA tests to remove paternity doubts, something the Trump administration had fought.

In April 2018, he presided over the case of a U.S. Border Patrol agent who pleaded guilty to smuggling drugs across the border, sentencing him to 70 months in federal prison.

On March 31, 2023, he granted a preliminary injunction against major portions of California's handgun roster in a case called Renna v. Bonta.

=== Recognition ===
The San Diego Union-Tribune named Sabraw its 2018 "San Diego Person of the Year" for his order ending the Trump administration's family separation policy, stating that Sabraw's ruling "ended a shameful chapter in our country's history" and adding: "His honest, thoughtful oversight of a complex case shouldn't be forgotten."

== Personal life ==
Sabraw lives in Scripps Ranch, San Diego. He is married to Summer Stephan, a career prosecutor with the San Diego County District Attorney's office who was elected District Attorney in June 2018. They have three children. Sabraw's aunt, uncle and cousin are also judges, serving on the bench in Northern California.

== See also ==
- List of Asian American jurists

Legal offices
Preceded by Seat established by 116 Stat. 1758	Judge of the United States District Court for the Southern District of California; 2003–present	Incumbent
Preceded by Larry Alan Burns	Chief Judge of the United States District Court for the Southern District of California; 2021–2025	Succeeded by Cynthia Bashant
