= Jinsook Ohta =

American judge (born 1976)

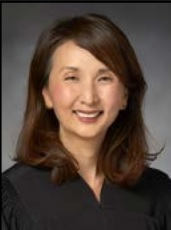
- Ohta in 2023

Judge of the United States District Court for the Southern District of California
- Incumbent
- Assumed office December 27, 2021
- Appointed by: Joe Biden
- Preceded by: Barry Ted Moskowitz

Judge of the San Diego County Superior Court
- In office December 8, 2020 – December 27, 2021
- Appointed by: Gavin Newsom
- Preceded by: Lantz Lewis
- Succeeded by: Rebecca S. Kanter

Personal details
- Born: Jin Sook Lee (이진숙); 1976 (age 49–50) Seoul, South Korea
- Party: Democratic
- Education: Yale University (BA); New York University (JD)

Jinsook Ohta (née Jin Sook Lee (이진숙), born 1976) is an American attorney and United States district judge of the United States District Court for the Southern District of California. She previously served as a judge on the San Diego County Superior Court.

== Education ==
Ohta received her Bachelor of Arts, magna cum laude and Phi Beta Kappa, from Yale University in 1998 and her Juris Doctor from New York University School of Law in 2001.

== Career ==
Ohta served as a law clerk for Judge Barry Ted Moskowitz of the United States District Court for the Southern District of California from 2001 to 2002 and again from 2007 to 2008. From 2002 to 2003, she was an associate with O’Melveny & Myers in Los Angeles from and from 2003 to 2006, she was an associate with Sheppard Mullin in San Diego. From 2006 to 2007, she was an assistant professor of law at the Thomas Jefferson School of Law. From 2011 to 2021, Ohta worked in the consumer protection section of the California Attorney General's office, first as deputy attorney general from 2011 to 2019 and then as a supervising deputy attorney general from 2019 to 2020. On December 8, 2020, California Governor Gavin Newsom appointed Ohta to be a judge of the San Diego County Superior Court.

== Federal judicial service ==
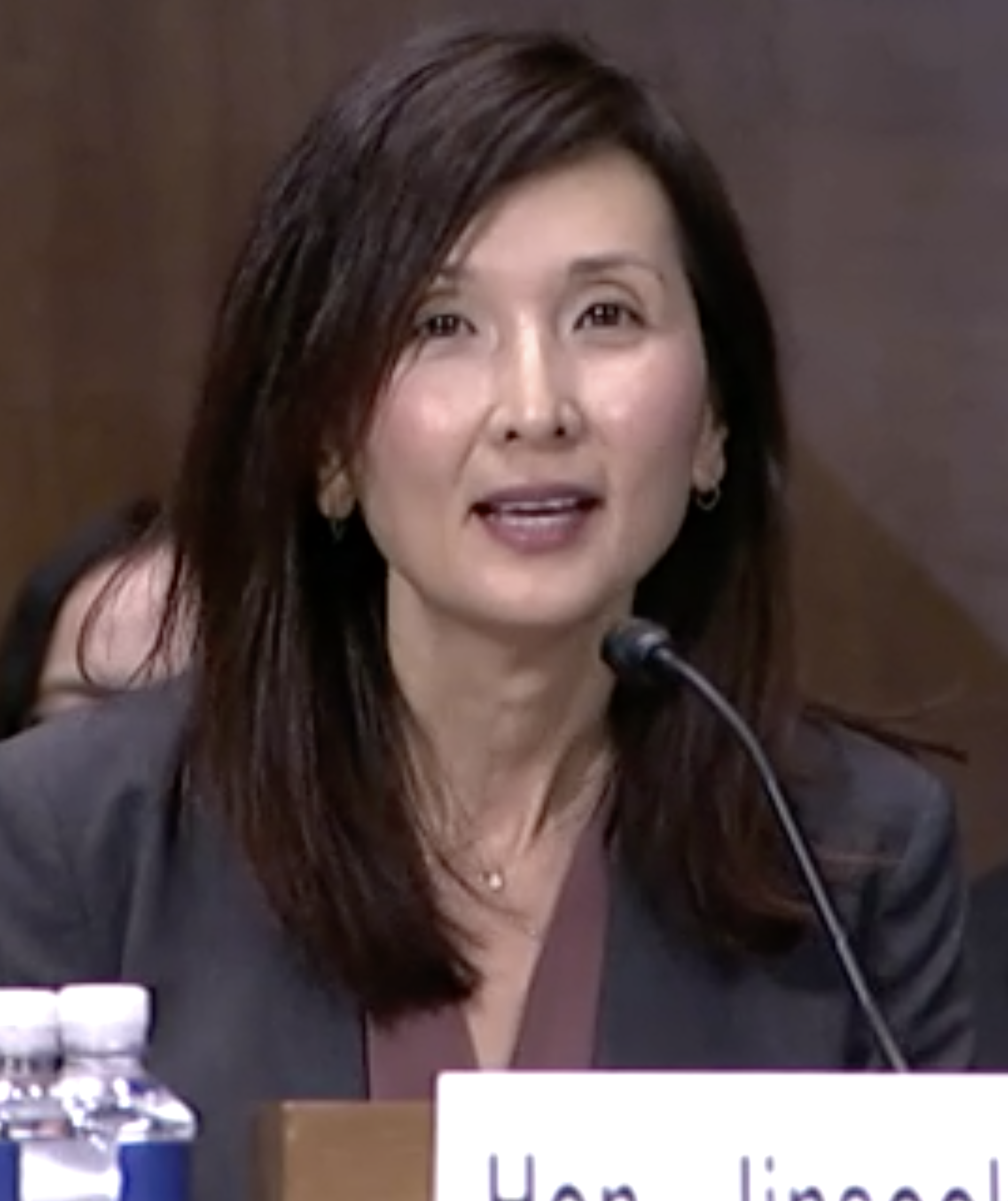
Ohta during her hearing with the Senate Judiciary Committee

On September 30, 2021, President Joe Biden nominated Ohta to serve as a United States district judge of the United States District Court for the Southern District of California. President Biden nominated Ohta to the seat vacated by Judge Barry Ted Moskowitz, who assumed senior status on January 23, 2019. On November 3, 2021, a hearing on her nomination was held before the Senate Judiciary Committee. During her confirmation hearing, she was questioned by three Republican senators over a statement she had endorsed which referred to a U.S. Supreme Court ruling upholding religious or moral exemptions to a contraception mandate as a "devastating blow to women's reproductive justice." On December 2, 2021, her nomination was reported out of committee by a 12–10 vote. On December 17, 2021, the United States Senate invoked cloture on her nomination by a 47–25 vote. Her nomination was confirmed later that day by a 47–24 vote. She received her commission on December 27, 2021. Ohta is the first Asian Pacific American female judge on the U.S. District Court for the Southern District of California.

== See also ==
- List of Asian American jurists

Legal offices
Preceded by Barry Ted Moskowitz	Judge of the United States District Court for the Southern District of California; 2021–present	Incumbent
