= Newport–Inglewood Fault =

Fault in Southern California

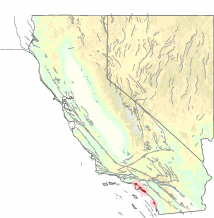
The Newport–Inglewood-Rose Canyon Fault Zone

The Newport–Inglewood Fault is a right-lateral strike-slip fault in Southern California. The fault extends for 47 mi (76 km) (110 miles if the Rose Canyon segment is included) from Culver City southeast through Inglewood and other coastal communities to Newport Beach at which point the fault extends east-southeast into the Pacific Ocean. The fault comes back on shore in the La Jolla area of San Diego and continues southward to downtown San Diego. In San Diego it is known as the Rose Canyon Fault. The fault can be inferred on the Earth's surface as passing along and through a line of hills extending from Signal Hill to Culver City. The fault has a slip rate of approximately 0.6 mm (0.024 in)/year and is predicted to be capable of a 6.0–7.4 magnitude earthquake on the moment magnitude scale. A 2017 study concluded that, together, the Newport–Inglewood Fault and Rose Canyon Fault could produce an earthquake of 7.3 or 7.4 magnitude.

The fault was first identified after a magnitude 4.9 earthquake struck near Inglewood, California, on June 21, 1920. Due to the lack of earthquake-resistant construction in southern California at this time, this quake caused considerable damage in the Inglewood area and was a preview of what was to come almost 13 years later. The Long Beach earthquake occurred on March 10, 1933, centered along the southern segment of this fault, and registering a magnitude 6.4; this quake killed 115 people and was the second most deadly earthquake in California history, after the 1906 San Francisco earthquake. Seventy schools in the Long Beach and Compton area were destroyed and an additional 120 were heavily damaged by the quake; had this tremor struck during school hours, the death toll would have been much higher, some estimates as high as 1000. In response to the poor performance of school structures, the California legislature passed the Field Act in April, mandating earthquake-resistant construction for all new school buildings.

The Newport–Inglewood Fault is part of the larger system of right-lateral strike-slip faults, most prominently the San Andreas Fault, which comprise the transform zone which separates the North American tectonic plate from the Pacific plate. The irregular hills which occur along the fault trace are a result of deformation of the sedimentary rocks by the faulting; some of the earliest petroleum production in California tap reservoirs formed by the deformation.

In July 2015, Jim Boles, a University of California, Santa Barbara, professor, reported that helium-3 was leaking naturally from oil wells up to 1.8 mi (2.9 km) deep, along a 30 mi (48 km) stretch from Los Angeles's Westside to Newport Beach, suggesting that the fault runs deep, though not necessarily changing the earthquake outlook.
