= J. Lawrence Irving =

American judge (1935–2024)

Judge of the United States District Court for the Southern District of California
- In office July 28, 1982 – December 31, 1990
- Appointed by: Ronald Reagan
- Preceded by: Edward Joseph Schwartz
- Succeeded by: Irma Elsa Gonzalez

Personal details
- Born: James Lawrence Irving; February 16, 1935 San Diego, California, U.S.
- Died: November 20, 2024 (aged 89) Coronado, California, U.S.
- Spouse: Evelyn Johnson
- Education: University of Southern California (BS, LLB)

Military service
- Branch/service: United States Army
- Years of service: 1954–1956

James Lawrence Irving (February 16, 1935 – November 20, 2024) was a United States district judge of the United States District Court for the Southern District of California.

== Life and career ==
=== Early life and education ===
Irving was born in San Diego, California, on February 16, 1935. He was in the United States Army from 1954 to 1956. He received a Bachelor of Science degree from the University of Southern California in 1959 and a Bachelor of Laws from the USC Gould School of Law in 1963. He was in private practice in San Diego from 1963 to 1982.

=== Federal judicial service ===
On July 15, 1982, Irving was nominated by President Ronald Reagan to a seat on the United States District Court for the Southern District of California vacated by Judge Edward Joseph Schwartz. Irving was confirmed by the United States Senate on July 28, 1982, and received his commission the same day. Irving served in that capacity until his resignation on December 31, 1990.

=== Resignation ===
Irving resigned due to a belief that federal mandatory minimum sentencing guidelines were unconstitutional and immoral. "If I remain on the bench I have no choice but to follow the law," he said. "I just can't, in good conscience, continue to do this".

=== Death ===
Irving died in Coronado, California, on November 20, 2024, at the age of 89.

== Sources ==
Legal offices
Preceded by Edward Joseph Schwartz	Judge of the United States District Court for the Southern District of California; 1982–1990	Succeeded by Irma Elsa Gonzalez
