= Irma Elsa Gonzalez =

American judge (born 1948)

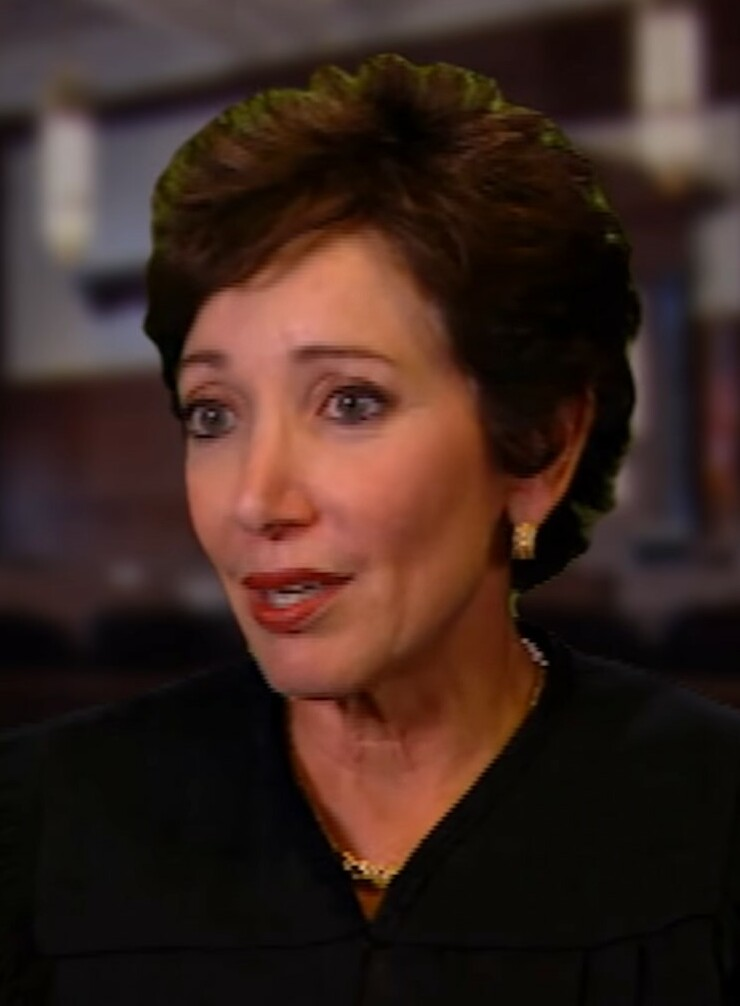
- Gonzalez in 2014

Senior Judge of the United States District Court for the Southern District of California
- In office March 29, 2013 – October 25, 2013

Chief Judge of the United States District Court for the Southern District of California
- In office 2005–2012
- Preceded by: Marilyn L. Huff
- Succeeded by: Barry Ted Moskowitz

Judge of the United States District Court for the Southern District of California
- In office August 12, 1992 – March 29, 2013
- Appointed by: George H. W. Bush
- Preceded by: J. Lawrence Irving
- Succeeded by: Cynthia Bashant

Magistrate Judge of the United States District Court for the Southern District of California
- In office 1984–1991

Personal details
- Born: March 29, 1948 (age 78) Palo Alto, California
- Education: Stanford University (BA); James E. Rogers College of Law (JD)

Irma Elsa Gonzalez (born March 29, 1948) is a retired United States district judge of the United States District Court for the Southern District of California, who was the first Mexican-American female federal judge. She is married to former federal prosecutor and trial attorney Robert S. Brewer Jr. who served as the U.S. attorney for Southern California from 2019 to 2021.

She was an assistant United States attorney of the Criminal Division for the U.S. Attorney's Office of the District of Arizona from 1975 to 1979. She was a trial attorney of the Antitrust Division of U.S. Department of Justice in Los Angeles in 1979. She was an assistant United States attorney of the Criminal Division for the U.S. Attorney's Office of the Central District of California from 1979 to 1981. She was in private practice of law in San Diego, California from 1981 to 1984. She was a judge on the San Diego County Superior Court from 1991 to 1992.

Gonzalez was a United States district judge of the United States District Court for the Southern District of California. Gonzalez was nominated by President George H. W. Bush on April 9, 1992, to a seat vacated by Judge J. Lawrence Irving. She was confirmed by the United States Senate on August 11, 1992, and received commission on August 12, 1992. Served as chief judge from 2005–2012.

== Education and early career ==
Born in Palo Alto, California, Gonzalez completed a Bachelor of Arts degree at Stanford University in 1970, and a Juris Doctor at the University of Arizona College of Law (now known as the James E. Rogers College of Law) in 1973. She clerked for Judge William C. Frey of the United States District Court for the District of Arizona from 1973 to 1975. Gonzalez worked as an Assistant United States Attorney for the United States Attorney for Arizona from 1975 to 1979, and then for the Central District of California from 1979 to 1981. She was in private practice in San Diego from 1981 to 1984.

== Judicial service ==
Gonzalez served as a United States magistrate judge for the United States District Court for the Southern District of California in 1984. California Governor Pete Wilson appointed Gonzalez as a state judge on the San Diego Superior Court in 1991.

On April 9, 1992, President George H. W. Bush nominated Gonzales to be a United States district judge of the United States District Court for the Southern District of California, to fill the seat vacated by Judge J. Lawrence Irving. The Senate confirmed her nomination on August 11, 1992 and she received her commission on August 12, 1992. She served as the Chief Judge of the Southern District from 2005 to 2012. Gonzalez assumed senior status on March 29, 2013, and retired on October 25, 2013.

On August 23, 2010 Gonzalez sided with Trump University in Makaeff vs. Trump University by allowing the countersuit by Trump University for defamation against Makaeff. Gonzalez's decision was unanimously overturned by the Ninth Circuit Court of Appeal on April 17, 2013.

== See also ==
- List of first women lawyers and judges in the United States
- List of Hispanic and Latino American jurists

== Sources ==
Legal offices
Preceded by J. Lawrence Irving	Judge of the United States District Court for the Southern District of California; 1992–2013	Succeeded by Cynthia Bashant
Preceded by Marilyn L. Huff	Chief Judge of the United States District Court for the Southern District of California; 2005–2012	Succeeded by Barry Ted Moskowitz
