= Andrew G. Schopler =

American judge (born 1971)

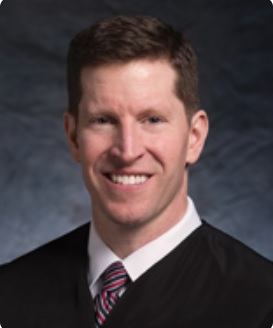

Judge of the United States District Court for the Southern District of California
- Incumbent
- Assumed office March 10, 2023
- Appointed by: Joe Biden
- Preceded by: Larry Alan Burns

Magistrate Judge of the United States District Court for the Southern District of California
- In office September 30, 2016 – March 10, 2023

Personal details
- Born: Andrew George Schopler; 1971 (age 54–55) Chapel Hill, North Carolina, U.S.
- Education: Dartmouth College (BA); Harvard University (JD)

Military service
- Branch/service: United States Army; California National Guard
- Years of service: 2014–Present
- Rank: Major
- Unit: Special Operations Command North
- Battles/wars: Operation Enduring Freedom; Operation North Star
- Awards: See list: Parachutist Badge Bronze Star Meritorious Service Medal Army Commendation Medal Army Achievement Medal Army Reserve Components Achievement Medal (with Bronze Oak Leaf Cluster) National Defense Service Medal Afghanistan Campaign Medal (with Bronze Star Device) Global War on Terrorism Service Medal Armed Forces Reserve Medal (with "M" Device) Army Service Ribbon Non-Article 5 NATO Medal California State Service Ribbon

Andrew George Schopler (born 1971) is an American lawyer who serves as a United States District Judge of the United States District Court for the Southern District of California. He served as a United States Magistrate Judge of the same court from 2016 to 2023.

== Education ==
Schopler received a Bachelor of Arts, summa cum laude, from Dartmouth College in 1994 and he received a Juris Doctor from Harvard Law School, cum laude, in 1997.

== Career ==
Schopler was a solo practitioner in Chapel Hill, North Carolina, from 1997 to 1998. In 1998, Schopler became an assistant public defender for district 15B in North Carolina. He returned to private practice that same year. Schopler was named to the North Carolina Capital Roster for capital murder cases.

From 1998 to 2004, he worked at Rudolf and Maher in Chapel Hill, North Carolina. From 2004 to 2016, he was an assistant United States attorney in the United States Attorney's Office for the Southern District of California.

=== Military service ===
Schopler has served in the California Army National Guard since 2014, holding the rank of major. In 2018, he deployed to Afghanistan as part of his duties as a Judge Advocate General (JAG) officer for Special Operations Command North (SOCNORTH), a Green Beret unit. During this deployment, he worked on special operations across Afghanistan and was awarded the Bronze Star Medal for his service.

Beginning in 2021, Schopler was involved in Operation North Star, aiding in the evacuation of U.S. citizens and at-risk Afghan allies from Afghanistan. His military commendations include the Meritorious Service Medal, Army Commendation Medal, Army Achievement Medal, Army Reserve Components Achievement Medal (with Bronze Oak Leaf Cluster), National Defense Service Medal, Afghanistan Campaign Medal (with Bronze Star Device), Global War on Terrorism Service Medal, Armed Forces Reserve Medal (with "M" Device), Army Service Ribbon, Non-Article 5 NATO Medal, California State Service Ribbon, and the Parachutist Badge.

=== Federal judicial service ===
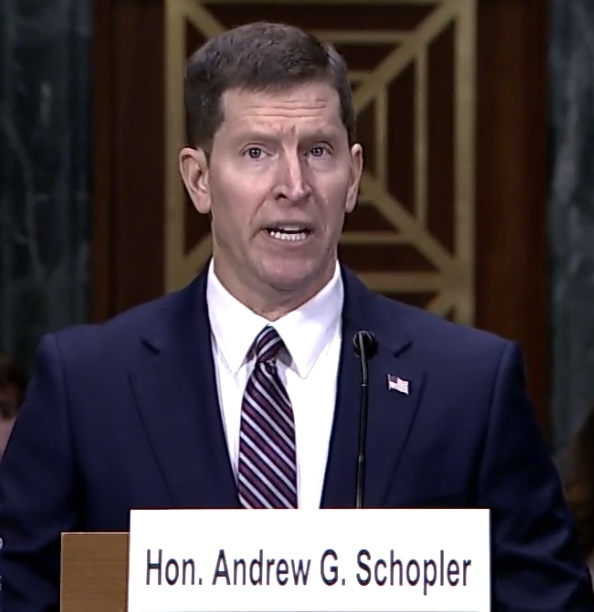
U.S. Senate Judiciary Committee hearing

Schopler served as United States Magistrate Judge of the Southern District of California from September 30, 2016 to March 10, 2023.

On July 14, 2022, President Joe Biden nominated Schopler to serve as a United States District Judge of the same court. His nomination received the support of Senators Alex Padilla and Dianne Feinstein. President Biden nominated Schopler to the seat vacated by Judge Larry Alan Burns, who assumed senior status on January 22, 2021. On December 13, 2022, a hearing on his nomination was held before the Senate Judiciary Committee. On January 3, 2023, his nomination was returned to the president under Rule XXXI, Paragraph 6 of the United States Senate. He was renominated on January 23, 2023. On February 9, 2023, his nomination was reported out of committee by a 15–6 vote. On March 7, 2023, the Senate invoked cloture on his nomination by a 57–39 vote. His nomination was confirmed later that day by a 56–39 vote. He received his judicial commission on March 10, 2023.

Legal offices
Preceded by Larry Alan Burns	Judge of the United States District Court for the Southern District of California; 2023–present	Incumbent
