= Barry Ted Moskowitz =

American judge (born 1950)

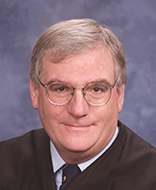

Senior Judge of the United States District Court for the Southern District of California
- Incumbent
- Assumed office January 23, 2019

Chief Judge of the United States District Court for the Southern District of California
- In office 2012 – January 23, 2019
- Preceded by: Irma Elsa Gonzalez
- Succeeded by: Larry Alan Burns

Judge of the United States District Court for the Southern District of California
- In office December 26, 1995 – January 23, 2019
- Appointed by: Bill Clinton
- Preceded by: Seat established by 104 Stat. 5089
- Succeeded by: Jinsook Ohta

Magistrate Judge of the United States District Court for the Southern District of California
- In office 1986–1995

Personal details
- Born: August 17, 1950 (age 75) Paterson, New Jersey
- Education: Rutgers University (BA, JD)

Barry Ted Moskowitz (born August 17, 1950) is a senior United States district judge of the United States District Court for the Southern District of California.

== Education and career ==
Moskowitz was born in Paterson, New Jersey. He received a Bachelor of Arts degree from Rutgers University in 1972 and a Juris Doctor from Rutgers Law School in 1975. He was a law clerk for Judge Leonard I. Garth on the United States Court of Appeals for the Third Circuit from 1975 to 1976. He was an assistant United States attorney for the District of New Jersey from 1976 to 1982. He was in private practice in Wayne, New Jersey from 1982 to 1985, and was then again an assistant United States attorney, this time in the Southern District of California, from 1985 to 1988.

=== Federal judicial service ===
From 1986 to 1995, Moskowitz was a United States magistrate judge of the Southern District of California. On June 30, 1995, Moskowitz was nominated by President Bill Clinton to a new seat on the United States District Court for the Southern District of California created by 104 Stat. 5089. He was confirmed by the United States Senate on December 22, 1995, and received his commission on December 26, 1995. He was elevated to chief judge on January 23, 2012 He assumed senior status on January 23, 2019.

== See also ==
- List of Jewish American jurists

== Sources ==
Legal offices
Preceded by Seat established by 104 Stat. 5089	Judge of the United States District Court for the Southern District of California; 1995–2019	Succeeded by Jinsook Ohta
Preceded by Irma Elsa Gonzalez	Chief Judge of the United States District Court for the Southern District of California; 2012–2019	Succeeded by Larry Alan Burns
