= Larry Alan Burns =

American judge (born 1954)

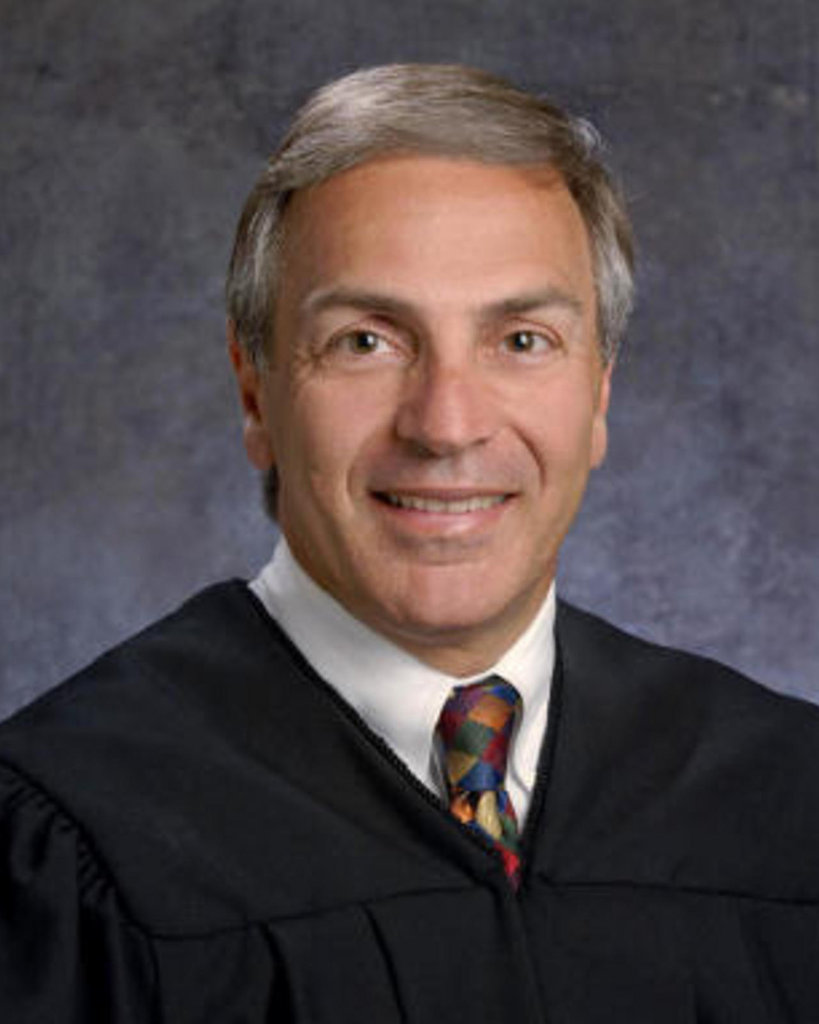

Senior Judge of the United States District Court for the Southern District of California
- In office January 22, 2021 – May 1, 2024

Chief Judge of the United States District Court for the Southern District of California
- In office January 23, 2019 – January 22, 2021
- Preceded by: Barry Ted Moskowitz
- Succeeded by: Dana Sabraw

Judge of the United States District Court for the Southern District of California
- In office September 25, 2003 – January 22, 2021
- Appointed by: George W. Bush
- Preceded by: Seat established by 116 Stat. 1758
- Succeeded by: Andrew G. Schopler

Magistrate Judge of the United States District Court for the Southern District of California
- In office June 1997 – September 2003

Personal details
- Born: Larry Alan Cockburn; June 29, 1954 (age 72) Pasadena, California, U.S.
- Spouse: Kristi L. Francis
- Education: Point Loma College (BA); University of San Diego (JD)

Larry Alan Burns (born June 29, 1954) is a retired United States District Judge of the United States District Court for the Southern District of California.

== Early life and education ==
Burns was born in Pasadena, California, as Larry Alan Cockburn, his last name was later changed to Burns at the age of 3 in 1957. He is of Scottish ancestry on his father's side and Armenian ancestry on his mother's side. Burns received a Bachelor of Arts degree from Point Loma College in 1976 and a Juris Doctor from the University of San Diego School of Law in 1979. He is the son of a Pasadena police officer. He was a Deputy District Attorney of San Diego County, California from 1979 to 1985. He was an Assistant United States Attorney for the Southern District of California from 1985 to 1997.

== Judicial service ==
In 1997, Burns was appointed to serve as a United States Magistrate Judge of the United States District Court for the Southern District of California. He was nominated as a United States District Judge by President George W. Bush on May 1, 2003, to a new seat on the Southern District of California created by 116 Stat. 1758. The American Bar Association unanimously rated him "well qualified" for the position, its highest rating. He was confirmed by the United States Senate on September 24, 2003 by a vote of 91-0. He received his commission on September 25, 2003. He became Chief Judge on January 23, 2019 after Barry Ted Moskowitz assumed senior status. Burns assumed senior status on January 22, 2021 and retired on May 1, 2024. He joined Judicate West, a prominent private dispute resolution firm in San Diego, on the same day.

On March 17, 2020, Burns declared a judicial emergency in the Southern District of California for one month, due to the COVID-19 epidemic. On April 2, the 9th Circuit's Judicial Council permitted the judicial emergency to be extended for one year, until April 17, 2021.

== Notable cases ==
On March 4, 2006, Burns sentenced former U.S. Representative Randy "Duke" Cunningham to eight years and four months in federal prison for taking $2.4 million in bribes from military contractors in return for smoothing the way for government contracts. It was the longest sentence ever imposed up to that time on a former member of Congress. During the sentencing, Burns told Cunningham "You undermined the opportunity and option for honest politicians to do a good job."

On November 5, 2007, Burns sentenced Francisco Javier Arellano Félix, head of the notorious Arrellano Felix drug cartel, to life in prison. During the sentencing hearing, Burns told Arrellano Felix "Your family name will live in infamy." U.S. authorities had captured Arrellano Felix a year earlier in international waters off Mexico's Baja California coast. Burns later sentenced brothers Benjamin Arrellano Felix and Edward Arrellano Felix and other cartel lieutenants to long prison terms.

On January 12, 2011, Chief Judge Alex Kozinski of the United States Court of Appeals for the Ninth Circuit selected Burns to be the presiding judge for the trial of Jared Lee Loughner. Burns was selected, in part, for his prior experience with cases involving the federal death penalty. The entire federal judiciary of Arizona recused themselves from the case due to their ties to the late John Roll, a federal judge who had been killed in the shooting, prompting the appointment of a judge from outside Arizona.

On December 20, 2012, Burns wrote an op-ed column in the Los Angeles Times calling for a reinstatement of the federal assault weapons ban. In the article, Burns described himself as an ardent conservative and gun owner who nonetheless felt there was no "social utility" for high-capacity clips. Besides the 31-round magazine Loughner used in his Glock, Burns cited as examples the 100-round drum magazine used by James Holmes in the 2012 Aurora, Colorado, shooting and the 30-round magazine used by Adam Lanza in the Sandy Hook Elementary School shooting. Burns called for Congress to reinstate the ban without the grandfather clause of the original ban, which allowed those who already owned a weapon on the banned list to keep it. "If we can't find a way to draw sensible lines with guns that balance individual rights and the public interest," Burns wrote, "we may as well call the experiment with American democracy a failure."

Legal offices
Preceded by Seat established by 116 Stat. 1758	Judge of the United States District Court for the Southern District of California; 2003–2021	Succeeded by Andrew G. Schopler
Preceded by Barry Ted Moskowitz	Chief Judge of the United States District Court for the Southern District of California; 2019–2021	Succeeded by Dana Sabraw
