= Rose Canyon Fault =

Seismic fault in Southern California

- Rose Canyon Fault Zone, Newport Inglewood-Rose Canyon Fault Zone, Newport Inglewood-Rose Canyon-Vallecitos-San Miguel Fault Zone, Newport Inglewood-Rose Canyon-Descanso-Agua Blanca Fault Zone
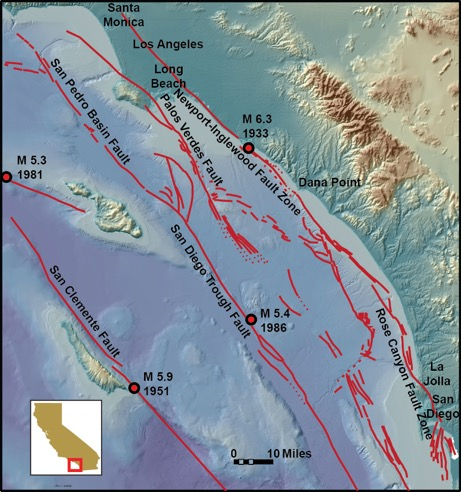
- The Rose Canyon Fault is located at the bottom right of the map
- Etymology: Rose Canyon
- Location: Onshore and offshore San Diego
- Country: United States
- State: California

Characteristics
- Part of: California Continental Borderland
- Length: ~19–106 mi (30–170 km)

Tectonics
- Plate: Pacific plate
- Earthquakes: 1862 San Diego earthquake
- Type: Right-lateral strike-slip

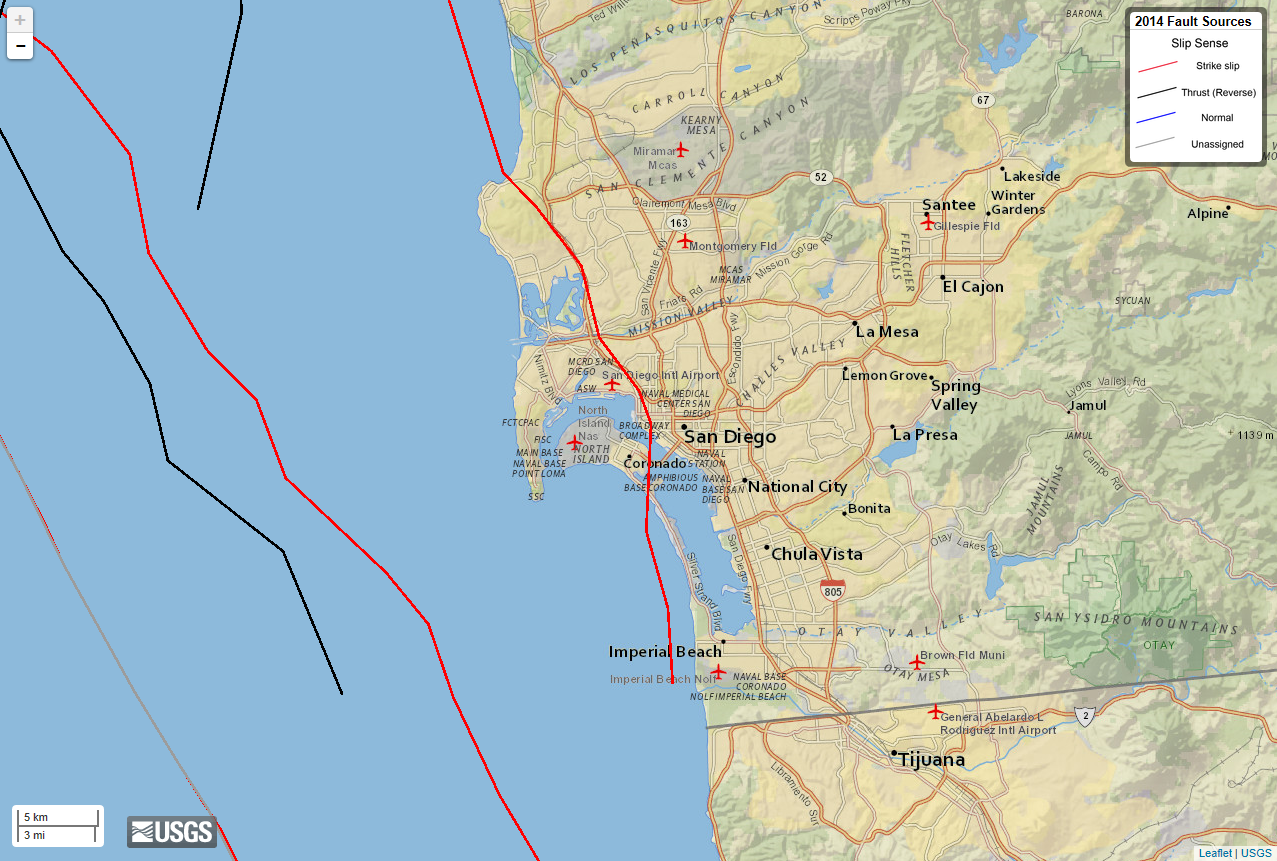
Rose Canyon Fault Map

The Rose Canyon Fault is a right-lateral strike-slip fault that runs in a north–south direction off the coast of San Diego County, California, until it comes ashore near downtown San Diego. The fault is linked to the Newport–Inglewood Fault (NIFZ) in the north and either the Agua Blanca Fault or San Miguel–Vallecitos Fault Zone in the south via en echelon stepovers. Conservative estimates of the fault place the length around 19–31 miles (30–50 kilometers), while interpretations including the NIFZ place the length at 110 mi (170 km). There are not many earthquakes associated with the fault; however, a magnitude 6–6.5 may have struck on the fault in 1862. The fault runs very near to populated areas when offshore; hence, there is high potential for infrequent large and damaging earthquakes.

== Tectonic setting ==
Southern California lies along a transform boundary between the Pacific plate and the North American plate. Faulting is taken up by three main groups of faults: the San Andreas Fault and linked faults, the eastern California shear zone (ECSZ), and the California Continental Borderland (CCB). The San Andreas system and the ECSZ take up around 85% of the deformation, while the CCB accommodates the rest. The CCB is itself split into the Inner (ICB) and Outer Continental Borderlands. The ICB takes up ~0.24–0.31 in (6–8 mm) of the plate boundary's slip, with the Rose Canyon Fault being one of the most hazardous faults in the ICB system.

== Fault characteristics ==
The right-lateral strike-slip fault extends for 19–31 mi (30–50 km) and slips at a rate of 0.043–0.079 in (1.1–2 mm)/yr. (Note: The Southern California Earthquake Center has the fault at 30 km, A 2010 paper by Thomas Rockwell has it at 40 km, and a 1997 book by Glenn Roquemore has the length at 50 km.) The fault begins in San Diego Bay, then runs through La Jolla before turning offshore. It extends north paralleling the coastline before connecting with the Newport–Inglewood Fault via short en echelon step overs, and the two faults together extend for 110 mi (170 km).

=== Southern terminus ===
The southern terminus of the Rose Canyon Fault Zone has not been conclusively determined, and is considered to connect to the Descanso and Agua Blanca Faults and/or the San Miguel–Vallecitos Fault Zone. Researchers have suggested that both of these faults may transfer slip to the Rose Canyon Fault via San Diego Bay step overs, however no clear connection has been determined. Around San Diego Bay, the fault splays out into many different strands, such as the Silver Strand and Spanish Bight faults. Some of these splay faults come very close to the Descanso Fault, which in turn links with the Agua Blanca Fault. This leads certain researchers to consider these faults interconnected as one major fault zone, the Newport Inglewood–Rose Canyon–Descanso–Agua Blanca Fault Zone. Others favor an interpretation which links the Rose Canyon to the San Miguel-Vallecitos Fault Zone, though just like with the Descanso and Agua Blanca faults, there are no visible faults connecting the two. Other researchers attempting to determine which of the two faults the Rose Canyon connects to in the south provide evidence for both faults having a potential link.

== Seismic activity ==
The Rose Canyon Fault has little associated historic seismicity, however a magnitude 6–6.5 earthquake in 1862 is often attributed to it. The shock was assigned a Modified Mercalli intensity shaking of VII (Very strong). Shaking was widespread and felt in Los Angeles (over 100 mi (160 km) away). However, due to the lack of reports in the area, it is not possible to guarantee that this earthquake occurred on the Rose Canyon Fault. Trenching of the fault reveals multiple ruptures within the past 8,100 years, including a rupture that occurred between 300 years to shortly before the San Diego Mission was established. Some of these historic ruptures have an estimated magnitude of 7–7.3.

== Future hazard ==
The Rose Canyon Fault Zone can produce large earthquakes which can be very destructive due to its proximity to major population centers in Southern California. On the fault, earthquakes nearing magnitude 7 have a recurrence interval between 700±400 and 2,000 years. Scenarios modeling a magnitude 6.9 earthquake predict peak ground acceleration will reach 0.55 g in San Diego, and 0.35 g in Tijuana. Downtown San Diego and Mission Bay will experience liquefaction, while Mt. Soledad may experience landslides. Coastal areas such as La Jolla and Point Loma may experience localized coastal bluff failures, and submarine canyons may have landslides which trigger tsunamis. Other studies link the Rose Canyon Fault with the Newport-Inglewood, and the combined fault zone can produce M7.3–7.4 earthquakes.
