= San Diego County Superior Court =

California superior court with jurisdiction over San Diego Country

Superior Court of California, County of San Diego
- Established: 1850
- Jurisdiction: San Diego County, California
- Location: Main & Juvenile: San Diego; East County: El Cajon; North County: Vista; South County: Chula Vista
- Appeals to: California Court of Appeal for the Fourth District, Division One
- Website: sdcourt.ca.gov

Presiding Judge
- Currently: Hon. Maureen F. Hallahan

Assistant Presiding Judge
- Currently: Hon. Michael S. Groch

Court Executive Officer
- Currently: Michael Roddy

The Superior Court of California, County of San Diego, informally the San Diego County Superior Court, is the California superior court with jurisdiction over San Diego County, California.

== History ==
Earlier San Diego courthouses

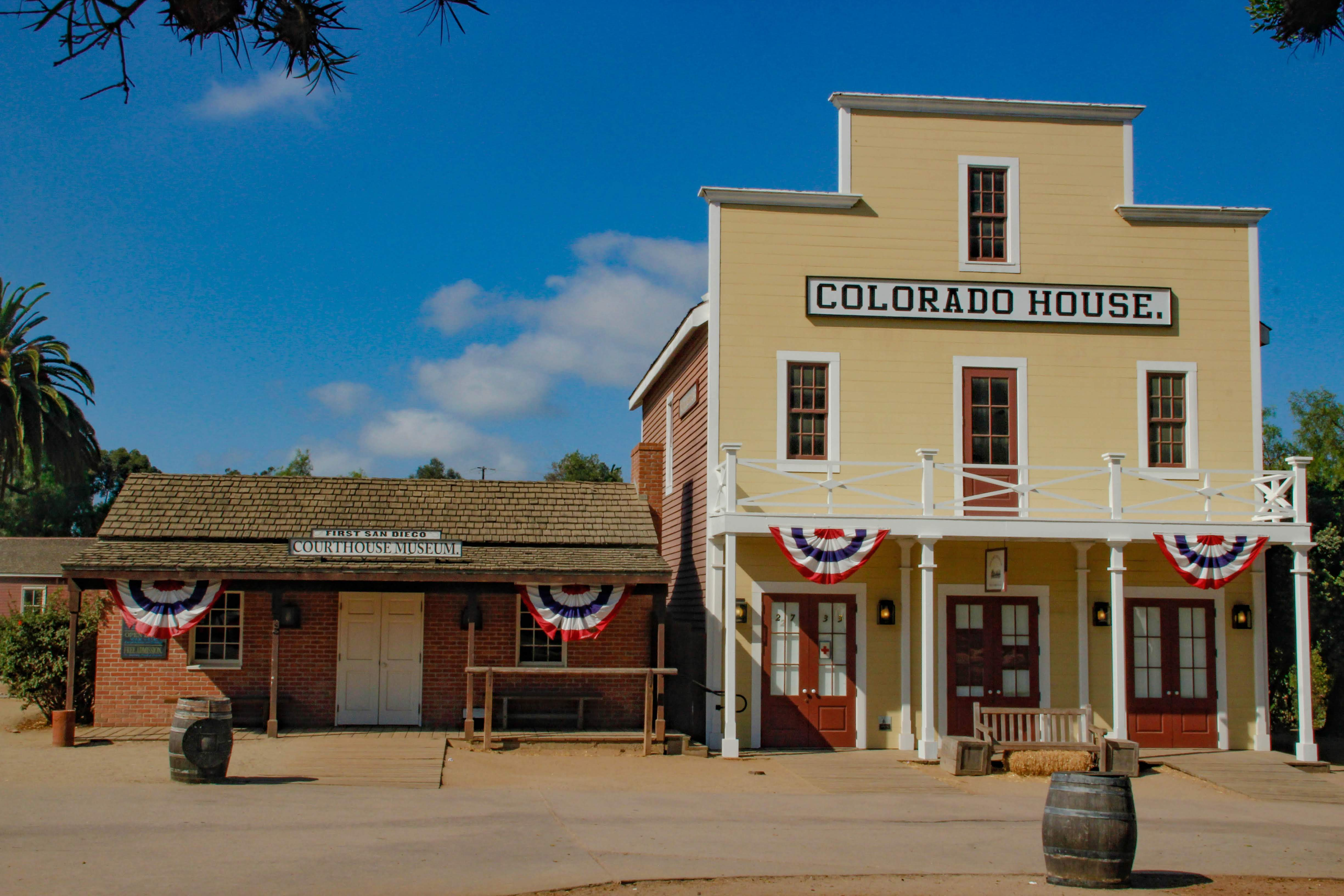
(Reconstructed) First San Diego Court House (1850–69) and Colorado House built by Cave Johnson Couts in Old Town San Diego State Historic Park (2018)

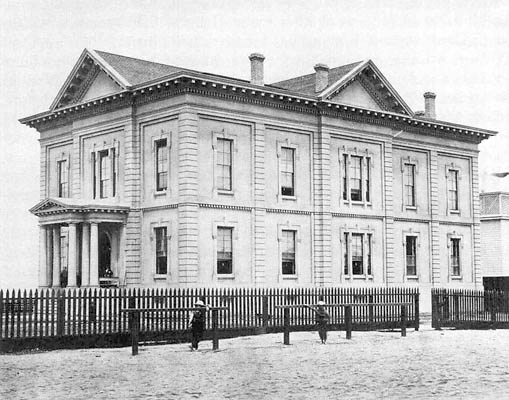
Second Court House, 1872–92 (c.1874)

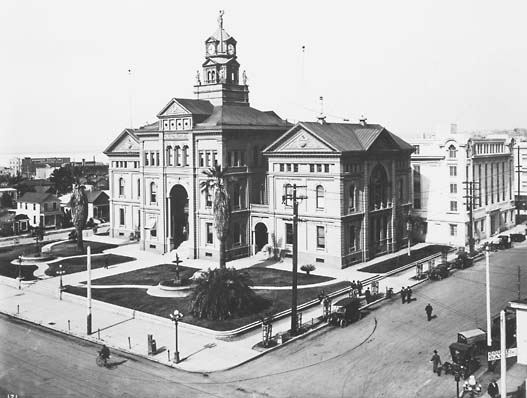
Third Court House, 1892–1961 (c.1913)

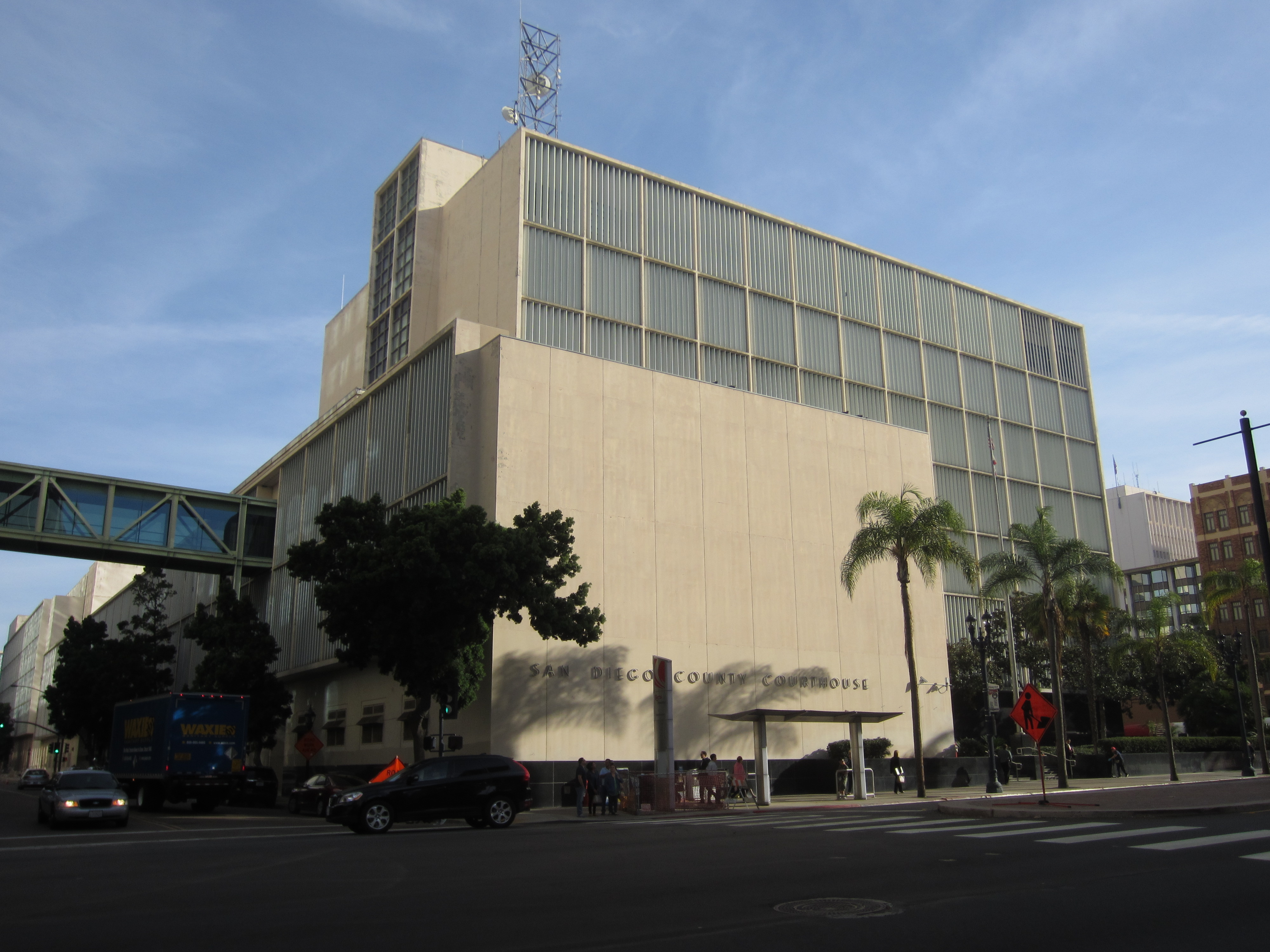
Fourth Court House, 1962–2018 (2016)

San Diego County was one of the original counties formed when California gained statehood in 1850. The first elected officers of the San Diego Court of Sessions met in October 1850, including presiding judge Hon. John Hayes and associate judges Charles Haraszthy and William H. Moon; the First Court House, approximately at the intersection of San Diego and Mason Streets, was part of what is now Old Town San Diego. County offices were moved to the Whaley House in 1869, and the original Court House was destroyed in the fire of 1872. The 1872 fire originated in the old Court House.

The second county courthouse was completed in 1872 on land donated by Alonzo Horton in "New Town" San Diego. It was replaced by a third county courthouse which was completed in 1892. The 42 clerestory stained glass windows featured the Great Seals of each state in the union at the time of its completion, and were saved after the courthouse was demolished in 1961. The 1892 structure was built at the corner of Front and D (now Broadway) in downtown San Diego after the architects hired to expand the 1872 courthouse (Nelson Comstock and Carl Trotsche) determined the structure could not support the new proposed wings.

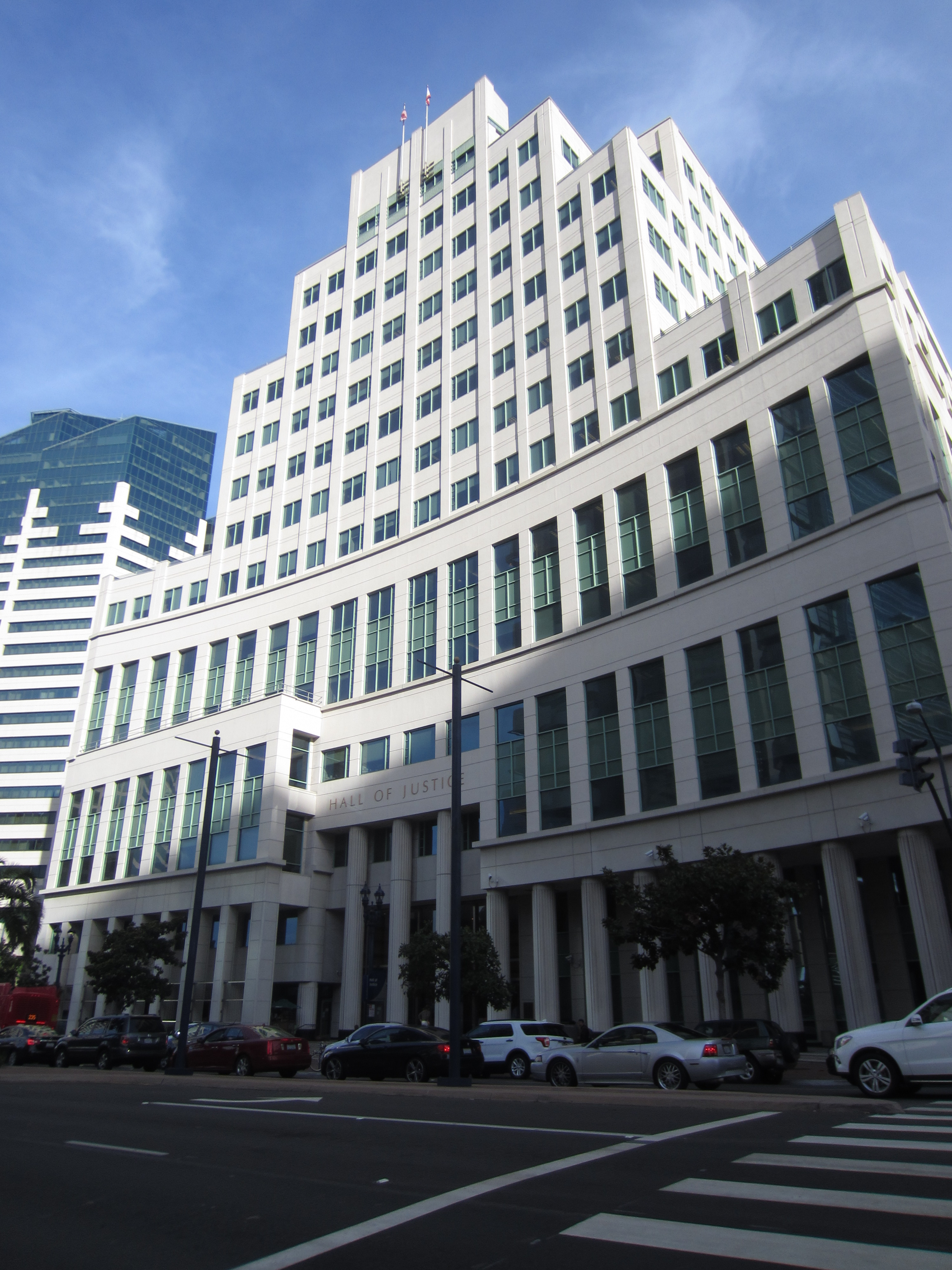
Hall of Justice (2016)

The fourth county courthouse was completed in 1961 across the street from where the Hall of Justice now stands. The stained glass windows were saved from the 1892 building, but were not installed into the 1961 Courthouse; instead, the windows were placed in the Hall of Justice, completed in 1996. The 1961 courthouse sat on the active Rose Canyon Fault and required asbestos abatement, prompting its replacement.

The fifth county courthouse was completed in June 2017 at a cost of US$555,500,000 (equivalent to $713,000,000 in 2024). The 2017 building, designed by Skidmore, Owings and Merrill, was the largest and most expensive courthouse in the state when it was finished. The courts moved to the new building in 2018. It was one of three examples cited for excessive costs and ornamentation by critics of the Judicial Council of California's construction program, along with the new Family Justice Center (completed in 2016 for Santa Clara County) and a new courthouse for Long Beach.

== Venues ==
San Diego County Superior Court locations:
1 Central Courthouse, 1100 Union St &
Hall of Justice, 330 W Broadway (San Diego)
2 Kearny Mesa, 8950 Clairemont Mesa Blvd (San Diego)
3 Juvenile Court, 2851 Meadow Lark Dr (San Diego)
4 East County, 250 E Main St (El Cajon)
5 North County, 325 S Melrose Dr (Vista)
6 South County, 500 3rd Ave (Chula Vista)

The main courthouse complex consists of two buildings in downtown San Diego: the Central Courthouse and the adjoining Hall of Justice. The Central Courthouse was completed in 2017 and consolidates criminal, probate, family court, and small claims services. The Hall of Justice was completed in 1996, which handles civil cases.

Small claims were moved from Kearny Mesa to the Central Courthouse; Kearny Mesa continues to handle minor traffic offenses, including juvenile traffic infractions. A separate Juvenile Court in Linda Vista handles cases for minors.

Three satellite courts are used to support communities in East County (El Cajon), North County (Vista), and South County (Chula Vista).
