= Long Beach (disambiguation) =

Long Beach is a city in Los Angeles County, California, United States.

Long Beach or Longbeach may refer to:

== Places ==
=== Asia ===
- The Long Beach, a private housing estate in Hong Kong

=== North America ===
==== Canada ====
- Long Beach (British Columbia), part of Pacific Rim National Park Reserve
- Long Beach, Kawartha Lakes, Ontario
- Long Beach, Newfoundland and Labrador
- Long Beach, Niagara Region, Ontario

==== United States ====
- Related to Long Beach, California:
  - California State University, Long Beach
  - Long Beach Airport
  - Long Beach Boulevard (California), a north–south thoroughfare in Los Angeles County
    - Long Beach Boulevard (Los Angeles Metro station), of a transit rail station in Lynwood, L.A. County, renamed Lynwood station in 2025
  - Long Beach Line, a former train route connecting from Long Beach to Los Angeles
  - Long Beach Naval Shipyard
  - Long Beach Search and Rescue
  - Long Beach Unified School District
  - Port of Long Beach
  - Grand Prix of Long Beach, an auto race in first held in 1975
- Long Beach, Connecticut, a beach in Fairfield County, Connecticut
- Long Beach, Indiana
- Long Beach, a lakeside village in the town of Sebago, Maine
- Long Beach, Maryland, a census-designated place
- Long Beach, Minnesota
- Long Beach, Mississippi
- Long Beach Island, New Jersey
  - Long Beach Island Consolidated School District
  - Long Beach Township, New Jersey
- Long Beach, New York
  - Long Beach Barrier Island, the island on which the city of Long Beach is located
  - Long Beach City School District, the island's primary school board
  - Long Beach (LIRR station), a station of the Long Island Rail Road
- Long Beach, North Carolina
- Long Beach Peninsula, Washington
  - Long Beach, Washington, a small town on the southern end of the peninsula

=== Oceania ===
==== Australia ====
- Long Beach, New South Wales, a suburb in Eurobodalla Shire
- Long Beach, South Australia, a beach east of the town of Robe

==== New Zealand ====
- Longbeach, New Zealand, a locality in Canterbury
- Long Beach, New Zealand, part of Dunedin in Otago

== Ships of the United States Navy ==
- USS Long Beach (CGN-9), the first nuclear-powered guided missile cruiser, serving from 1961 to 1995
  - Long Beach-class cruiser, a ship class of the United States Navy with only one member, CGN-9
- USS Long Beach (PF-34), a patrol frigate in use from 1943 to 1945, loaned to the Russian Navy and then in 1962 to the Japan Maritime Self-Defense Force as Shii (PF-17)

== Other uses ==
- Longbeach (cigarette), a brand of cigarettes in Australia
- "Long Beach Iced Tea", a variation of Long Island Iced Tea which substitutes cranberry juice for sours mix; named because of the cranberry bogs near Long Beach Island, New Jersey
- Long Beach Branch, a train line on Long Island, New York
- "Long Beach," an instrumental song released by Gorillaz for the 2017 Super Deluxe release of Humanz
