= Los Angeles earthquake =

Los Angeles earthquake could refer to:

- 1933 Long Beach earthquake
- 1952 Kern County earthquake
- 1971 San Fernando earthquake
- 1987 Whittier Narrows earthquake
- 1991 Sierra Madre earthquake
- 1992 Landers earthquake
- 1994 Northridge earthquake
- 2008 Chino Hills earthquake

== See also ==
- List of earthquakes in California
