= Sierra Madre Fault Zone =

Seismic fault in Southern California

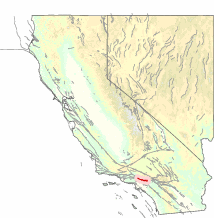
The Sierra Madre Fault Zone highlighted in red

Situated at the boundary to the San Gabriel Valley and San Fernando Valley, the Sierra Madre Fault Zone (also known as the Sierra Madre-Cucamonga Fault) runs along the southern edge of the San Gabriel Mountains for a total of 95 kilometers (59 mi), where the northwesternmost 19 km (12 mi) comprises the San Fernando Fault (the section responsible for the 1971 San Fernando earthquake). A 1980s paleoseismic study that included a trench investigation and mapping revealed that a major earthquake had most likely not occurred to the east of the San Fernando rupture area for at least the last several thousand, and possibly the last 11,000 years.

The 1971 event was the first in a series (1987 Whittier Narrows, 1991 Sierra Madre, 1994 Northridge) of damaging earthquakes which have occurred on reverse faults in the Los Angeles area. The events triggered discussions concerning the largest magnitude earthquake that could be generated by one of the faults, especially in the Transverse Ranges, but the focal point of earthquake hazard assessments in California are often the San Andreas Fault and other associated dextral faults. Although there is a lack of paleoseismic data on reverse faults in the Los Angeles area, a trench excavation at a site on the Sierra Madre-Cucamonga Fault revealed that two large historic earthquakes occurred in the last 15,000 years.

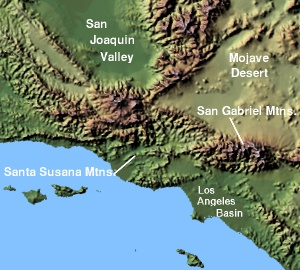
The central Transverse Ranges

The fault was studied again in the late 1990s in the Loma Alta Park near Millard Canyon where a fault scarp larger than 2 m (6 ft 7 in) was accessible along a (late quaternary) elevated stream terrace. The clearly defined fault was exposed in the trench and emerged as a .5 m (1 ft 8 in) band of coarse gravels lining the hanging wall. By studying the truncated rocks and a wedge-shaped accumulation of gravel and soil, it was possible to visually reconstruct the original geometry of the rock prior to the thrust and eventual and partial collapse of the hanging wall back onto the footwall. An estimate for the maximum slip of the event was given as 3.8–4 meters (12–13 ft).

The evidence found at the Loma Alta trench investigation site brought new information into the deliberation regarding the maximum size of earthquakes near Los Angeles. The large amount of slip observed there did not correspond with a short 15–20 km (9.3–12.4 mi) rupture length of the Sierra Madre Fault Zone, and instead suggested that the historical thrust earthquakes were much larger in magnitude than what was seen with the 1971 event, given its smaller 2 meters (6 ft 7 in) of maximum observed displacement. Two methods were employed to infer the scope of the events at the site (one regression-based and the other based on the seismic moment) and produced a maximum magnitude of 7.5 or 7.6 for the most recent movement of the fault. The results supported an earlier hypothesis that seismic energy release on the Sierra Madre Fault Zone is characterized by infrequent but large earthquakes. A duplicate event in modern times would rupture to the south towards populated areas and would produce strong ground motion capable of damaging modern buildings and other critical infrastructure.
