= 1991 Sierra Madre earthquake =

- UTC time: 1991-06-28 14:43:55
- ISC event: 330437
- USGS-ANSS: ComCat
- Local date: June 28, 1991; 35 years ago
- Local time: 07:43:55
- Magnitude: 5.6 M_{w}
- Depth: 6.2 mi (10 km)
- Epicenter: 34.22°N 118.07°W
- Type: Thrust
- Areas affected: Greater Los Angeles Area; Southern California; United States
- Total damage: $33.5–40 million
- Max. intensity: MMI VII (Very strong)
- Peak acceleration: 0.58 g at Cogswell Dam
- Landslides: Yes
- Casualties: 2 deaths 100–107 injured

The 1991 Sierra Madre earthquake occurred on June 28 at 07:43:55 local time with a moment magnitude of 5.6 and a maximum Mercalli intensity of VII (Very strong). The thrust earthquake resulted in two deaths, around 100 injuries, and damage estimated at $33.5–40 million. The event occurred beneath the San Gabriel Mountains on the Clamshell–Sawpit Fault, which is a part of the Sierra Madre–Cucamonga Fault System. Instruments captured the event at a number of strong motion stations in Southern California.

== Preface ==
Due to its history of generating great earthquakes (1857, 1906) the focal point of earthquake hazard assessment in California has been the strike-slip San Andreas System of faults. However, a system of faults, including the Sierra Madre–Cucamonga Fault System that runs along the border of the San Gabriel and San Fernando Valleys, has also caused a series of moderate to large events in the Greater Los Angeles Area. The westernmost portion of this fault system ruptured in 1971 and has been identified as one of six major fault systems that pose a threat to the highly populated region.

Geodetic research has shown that crustal shortening is occurring in the region of the Transverse Ranges at a rate of 0.33 inches (8.5 mm) per year. Although a number of earthquakes have occurred in the Los Angeles area since 1971, the rate of moderate events since then may not be typical, and few large events have occurred since records have been kept. The rate of contraction and too few moderate events that have occurred indicated to researchers that a deficit of seismic energy release exists, and that larger, but less frequent events may also contribute to the release of strain accumulation.

== Tectonic setting ==
To the west of the San Andreas Fault, the southern edge of the Transverse Ranges has been in a state of contraction during the Quaternary Period, with active reverse faulting that has uplifted San Gabriel Mountains. The west-striking (and range-bounding) Sierra Madre–Cucamonga Faults, as well as the San Cayetano Fault and Santa Susana Faults all exhibit a component of left-lateral strike-slip motion and share a similar trend.

The Malibu Coast–Santa Monica Fault lies at the southern flank of the Santa Monica Mountains and the Raymond Fault runs to the south of the Verdugo Mountains and meets the San Gabriel Mountains at Monrovia. The Clamshell–Sawpit Fault lies beneath the San Gabriel Mountains inline with the Raymond Fault. The characteristics of the various faults are difficult to interpret, but they all dip steeply to the north with several thousand feet of displacement.

== Earthquake ==
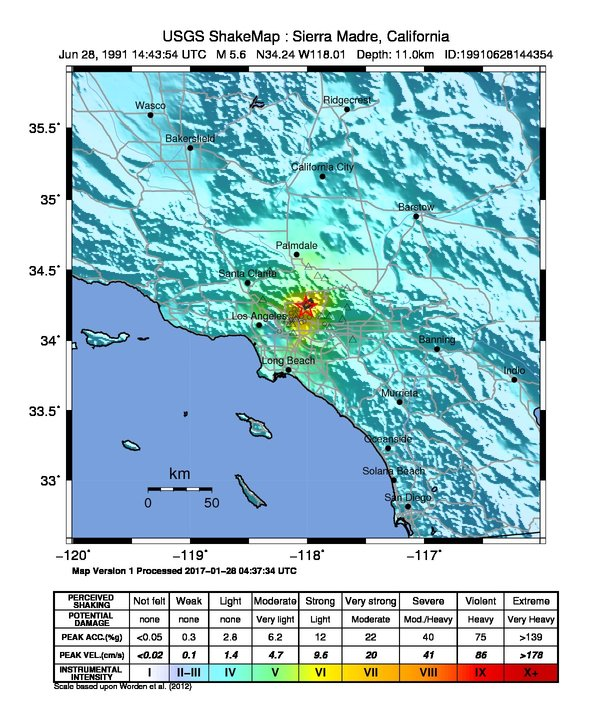
USGS ShakeMap for the event

The shock occurred on June 28, 1991, at 07:43:55 local time, and was the result of thrust faulting on the Clamshell–Sawpit Fault at the southern boundary of the San Gabriel Mountains. At less than 0.39 in (1 cm), the total amount of uplift was very minimal, considering the 6 ft 7 in (2 m) of vertical displacement that was observed during the 1971 San Fernando earthquake. The uplift initiated about two million years ago, and is a result of the convergence of the Pacific and North American plates near the restraining bend of the San Andreas Fault.

=== Damage ===
The earthquake was felt from Santa Barbara in the west, to Palm Springs in the east, and south to the Mexico–United States border. It was centered about 7.5 miles (12.1 km) northeast of Sierra Madre. Hundreds of homes were damaged and at least three roads leading up to Mount Wilson were blocked by landslides. A woman was killed when a steel beam fell at the Santa Anita Park racetrack in Arcadia and another woman died as a result of a heart attack in Glendale.

Also in Arcadia, a Motel 6 was badly damaged. Other structural damage resulted from the shock. For example, both Monrovia and Pasadena each had more than a dozen buildings that were uninhabitable, but for the most part damage was limited to cracked plaster and broken windows. The Pasadena City Hall had moderate damage consisting of a cracked wall, dislodged marble barriers in the restrooms, and an offset dome. In Sierra Madre, four apartment buildings and nine homes were also tagged as uninhabitable. Of the more than 100 injuries that were reported in Arcadia, Pasadena, Glendale, and Sierra Madre, most were cuts, bruises, and sprains, but some serious injuries also occurred.

=== Intensity ===
With an area of perceptibility of around 58,500 km^{2}, the shock was felt from Santa Barbara and Bakersfield to San Diego, Palm Springs, and Las Vegas. This is about half the felt area that was seen during the 1987 Whittier Narrows earthquake, which was felt over an area of 110,000 km^{2}. The maximum intensity observed in the urban areas that were affected was VII (Very strong), but the intensity in the epicentral area is unknown because of its remote location in the mountainous Angeles National Forest, though rock slides and landslides occurred there as a result of strong shaking. Intensity VI (Strong) effects were observed over 1,100 km^{2}, from Altadena and La Verne along the base of the mountains, to East Los Angeles.

=== Strong motion ===
The California Strong Motion Instrumentation Program (CSMIP) obtained 120 records from 48 ground response stations, 38 buildings, six dams, an airport control tower, and a power station. The individual stations that reported were as close as 2.5 miles (4 km) (Cogswell Dam) to as far as 50 miles (80 km) (Neenach), but most were within 40 km (25 mi). In downtown Pasadena, accelerations of 0.20 g were measured at the bottom floor of three buildings, but the duration of strong motion was only about two seconds. At the Altadena station (8.1 mi (13 km) from the epicenter) 0.46 g was recorded. The Cogswell Dam station recorded a peak horizontal acceleration of 0.58 g, but no major damage occurred.

== Recurrence interval ==
Although the long term slip rate of the constituent faults that make up the Sierra Madre Fault Zone are not precisely known, several studies have put forth scenarios for possible future activity. Two independent reports suggested that if the complete (62 mi (100 km)) fault system were to rupture, it could result in a M_{s} 7.7 shock similar to the 1952 Kern County earthquake. One researcher stated that the recurrence interval for such an event would be greater than 5,000 years. Another proposal was for one of the seven individual segments to rupture in a M6.4–6.6 event, comparable with the 1971 San Fernando earthquake. The recurrence interval for this type of event was placed at 200 years.

== See also ==
- List of earthquakes in 1991
- List of earthquakes in the United States
- List of earthquakes in California
