= Wadsworth Chapel =

- Catholic-Protestant Chapels, Dept. of Veterans Affairs Center
- U.S. National Register of Historic Places
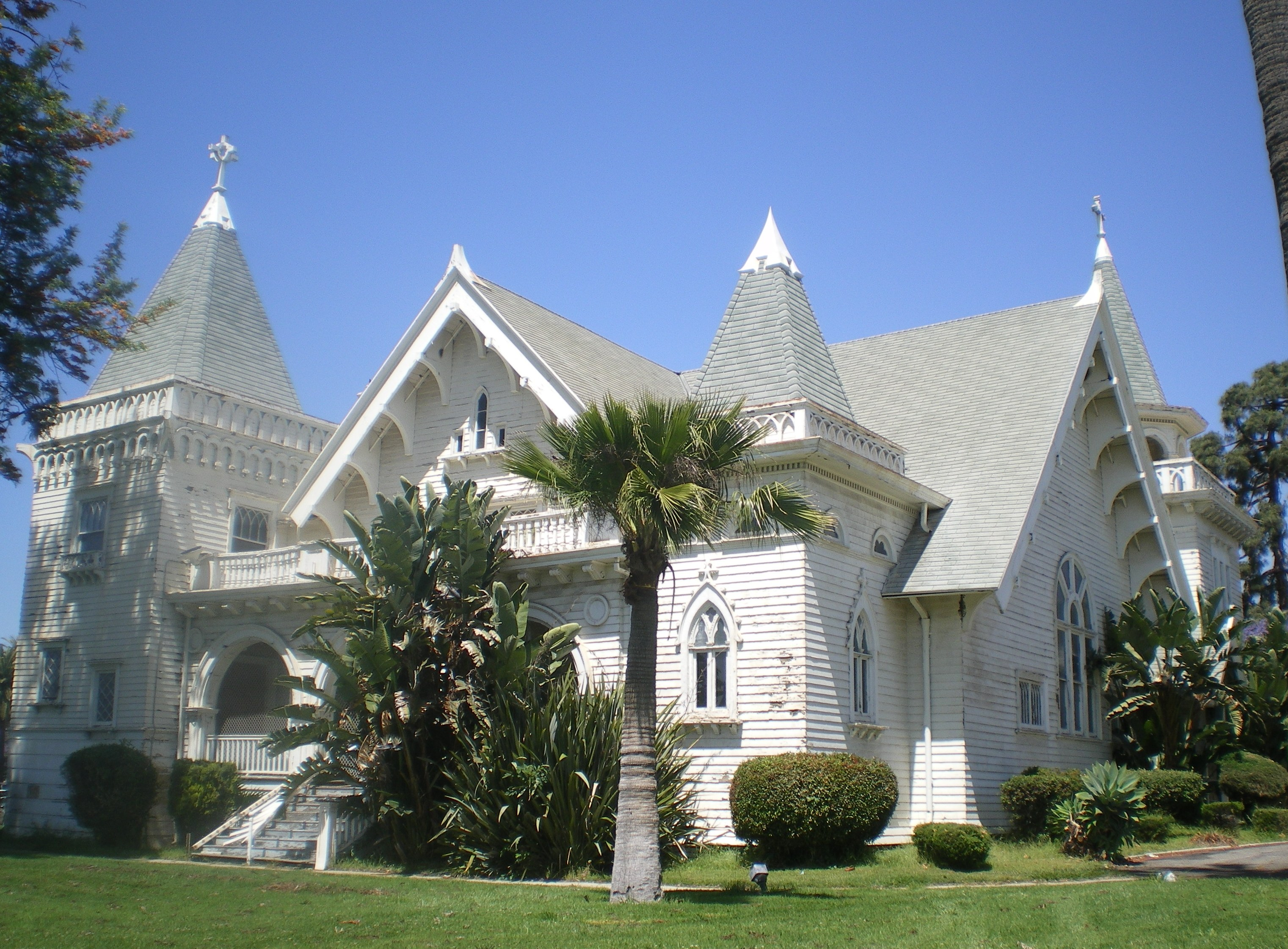
- Wadsworth Chapel, May 2008

- Location within the Los Angeles metropolitan area Location within California Location within the United States
- Location: Los Angeles, California
- Coordinates: 34°3′18″N 118°27′19″W
- Built: 1900
- Architect: Burton, J. Lee
- Architectural style: Carpenter Gothic, Romanesque Revival, Shingle-style Queen Anne
- NRHP reference No.: 72000229
- Added to NRHP: February 11, 1972

Wadsworth Chapel, also known as the Catholic-Protestant Chapels, has two sanctuaries under one roof on the campus of the Dept. of Veterans Affairs Medical Center in West Los Angeles, California. The structure was built in 1900 and was closed in 1971 after being damaged in the Sylmar earthquake. It is the oldest building on Wilshire Boulevard and was listed in the National Register of Historic Places in 1972. The structure has fallen into a state of disrepair due to the lack of funds within the Dept. of Veterans Affairs to pay for the required repairs and renovation.

== Early history ==
The 388-acre (1.57 km^{2}) Department of Veterans Affairs Medical Center in West Los Angeles was deeded to the federal government in 1888 to build the Pacific Branch of the National Home for Disabled Volunteer Soldiers. A series of Victorian dormitories were built in the 1890s, and Wadsworth Chapel was built in 1900 to provide a place of worship for the residents of the old soldiers’ home.

== Architecture ==
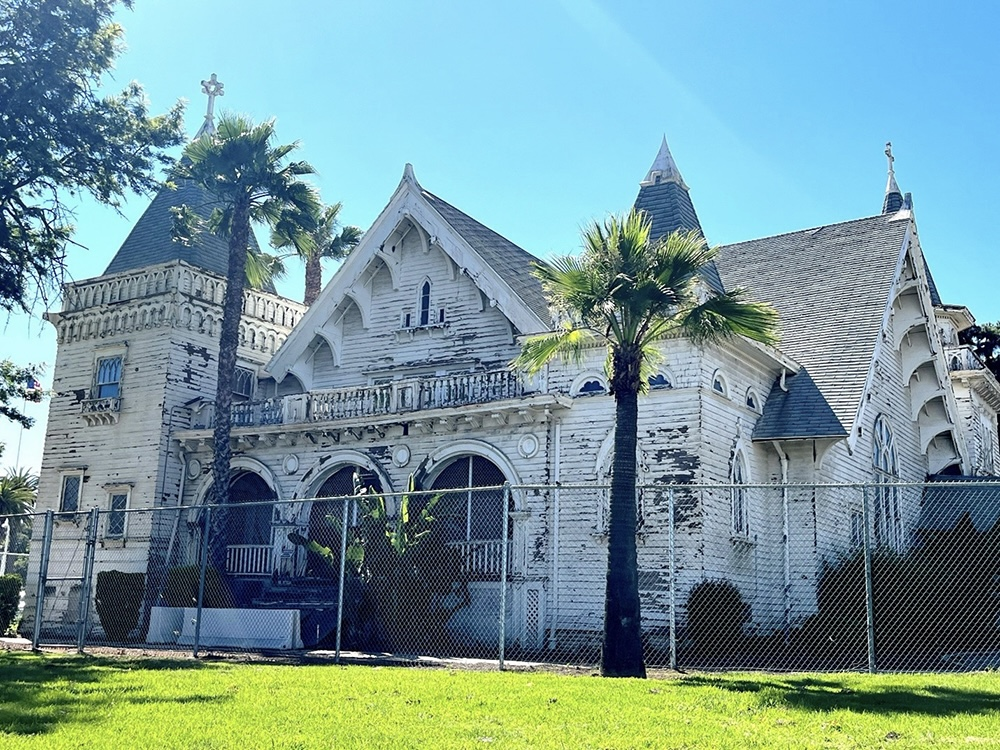
The deteriorating building in 2020

The building has two sanctuaries separated by a double brick wall, with the Catholic chapel at the north end and the Protestant chapel at the south end. Each chapel has a separate entrance, with a tower and belfry. Designed by J. Lee Burton, Wadsworth Chapel had been called an "intricate little jewel box" by Christopher Alexander, the associate curator of architecture for the Getty Research Institute.

The building is noted for its eclectic exterior ornamentation and its combination of Colonial Revival (sometimes classified as Romanesque Revival) and Carpenter Gothic Victorian architecture. The Los Angeles Cultural Heritage Board has described the Wadsworth Chapel and other original buildings on the Veterans campus as "the most monumental complex of Shingle-style Queen Anne structures ever constructed in the Los Angeles area." The 7,500-square-foot (700 m^{2}) building was built at a cost of $12,400 in 1900 with redwood siding and 21 different types of windows.

Though the exterior has been painted all white since 1941, the exterior was originally stained in dark earth tones, with white trim, as shown in old postcards of the chapel. The Protestant chapel was damaged by fire in 1955. The VA lacked funds to repair all of the fire damage, and the balcony of the Protestant chapel has been closed since that time.

== Deterioration and renovation proposals ==
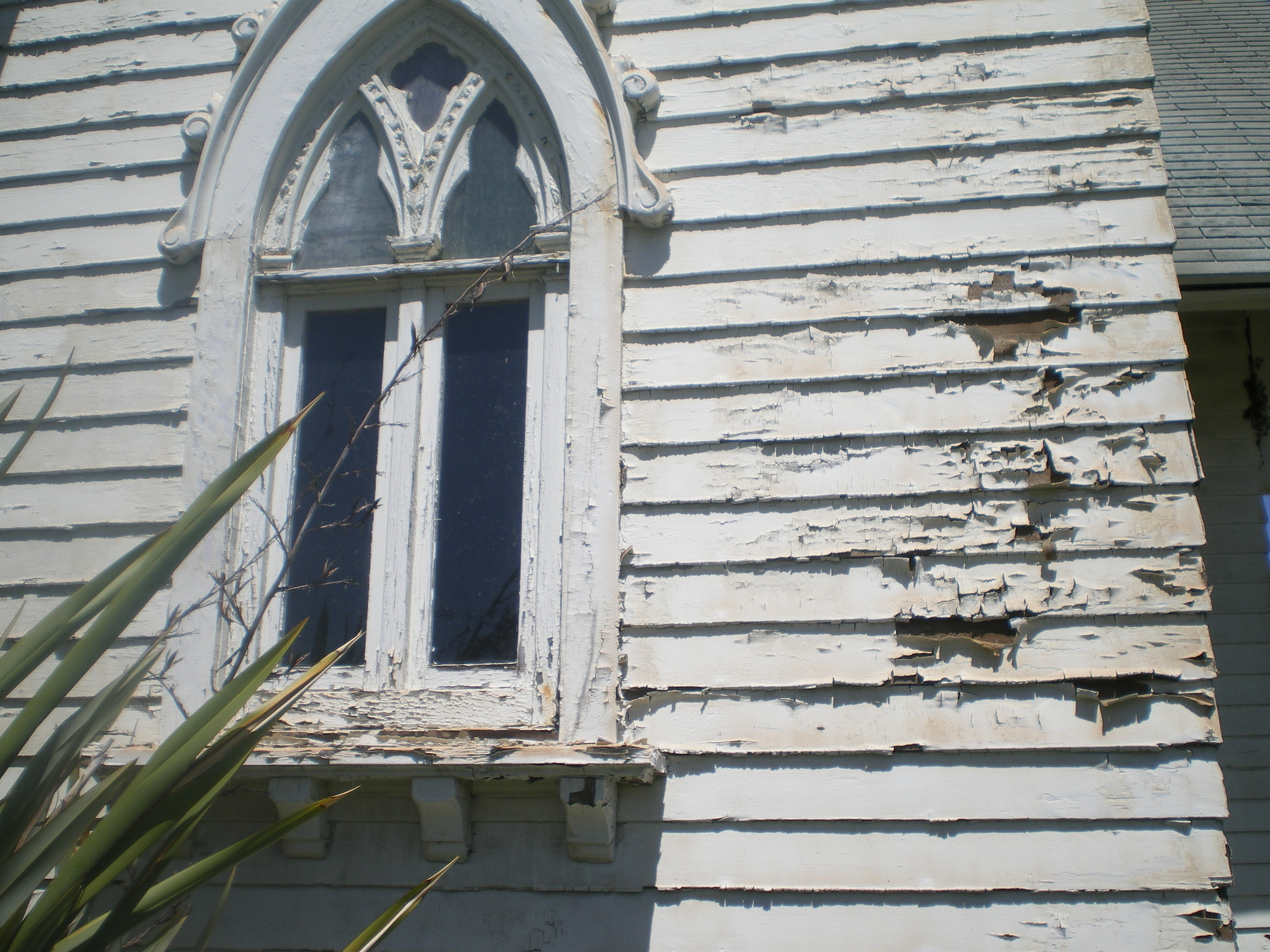
Closeup of deterioration, 2008

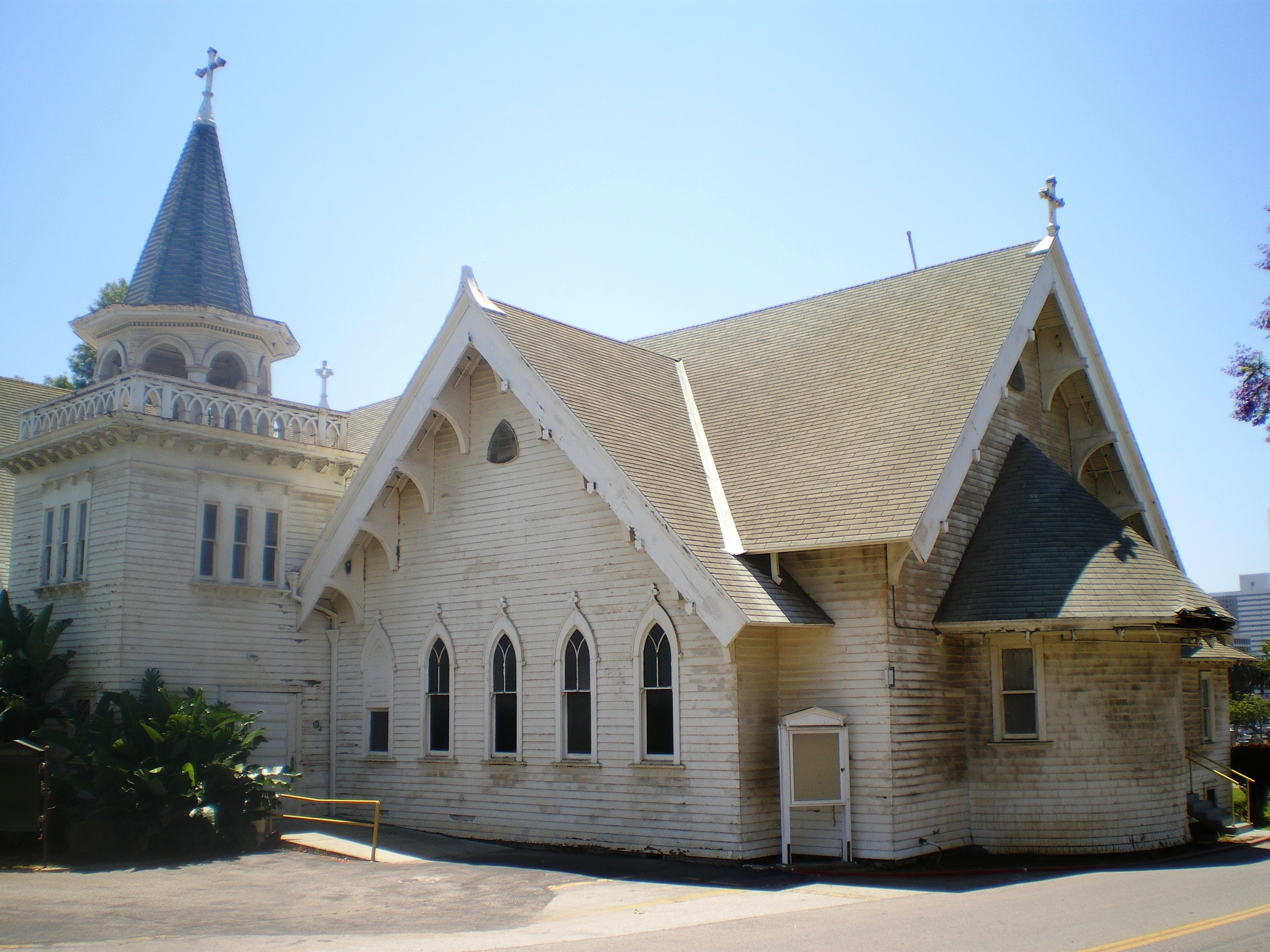
North side, 2008

The building has been closed to the public since the 1971 Sylmar earthquake loosened the foundation and caused the northeast bell tower to pull away from a gable. Since 1971, the building has fallen into an ever-worsening state of disrepair. The VA has not provided the funding needed to repair and restore the building. Despite its neglect for more than 50 years, preservation experts note that the building, the oldest remaining building on Wilshire Boulevard, is a prime candidate for architectural resurrection. The VA has estimated the cost of renovation to be $11.5 million, with the required work including replacement of the masonry foundation, seismic retrofit and asbestos and lead paint removal.

With the VA lacking funds to provide services to veterans of the Iraq War, many object to spending nearly $12 million to renovate the chapel. In a 2007 Los Angeles Times article, one veteran reflected ambivalence about the proposed renovation: “That is such a beautiful piece of workmanship and, yes, it cries out to be repaired..... At the same time, the veterans cry out to be repaired. It’s a moral issue.” Efforts by the Veterans Park Conservancy to raise private funds to pay for the renovation had been unsuccessful as of 2007. The Times noted: “The oldest building on Wilshire Boulevard is a fixer upper duplex of a most unusual sort.”

== See also ==
- List of Registered Historic Places in Los Angeles
- Streetcar Depot, West Los Angeles
