= The Long Beach =

Hong Kong private housing estate

Coordinates: 22.3201°N 114.1560°E

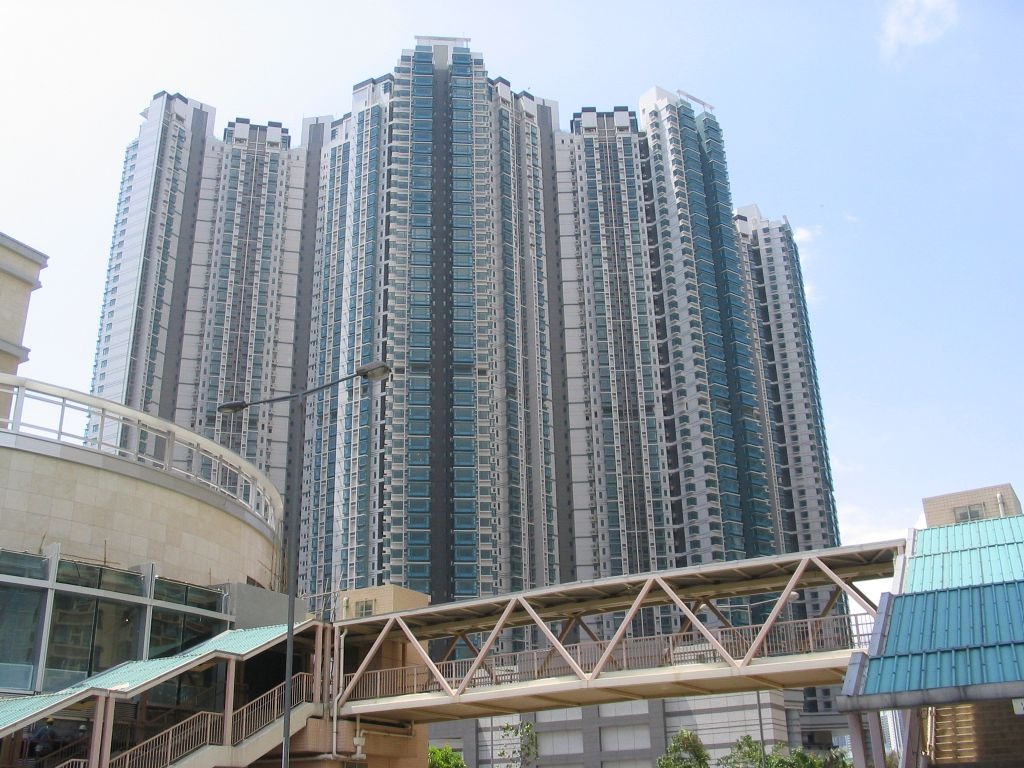
The Long Beach

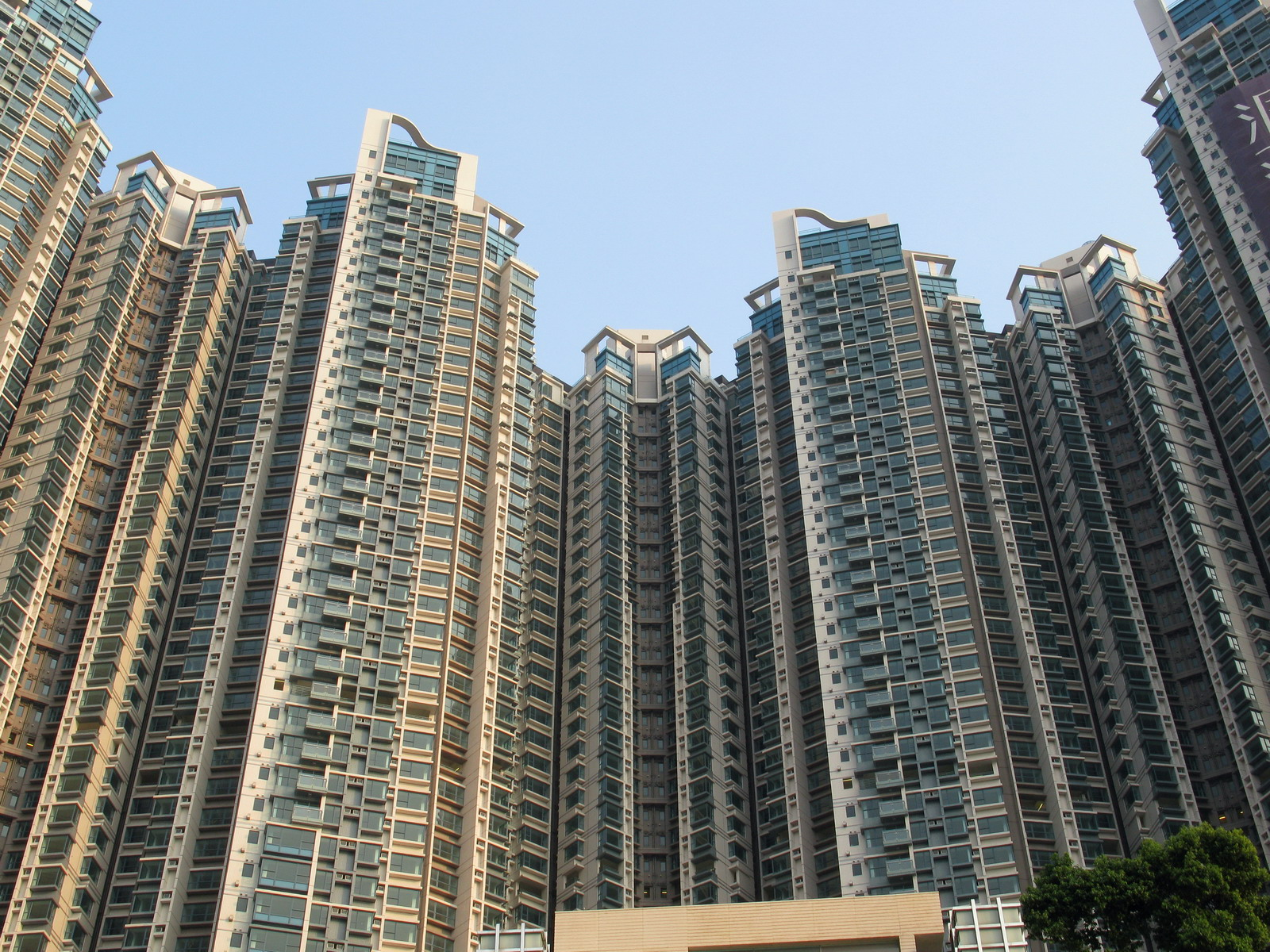
The Long Beach viewed from Stonecutters Island

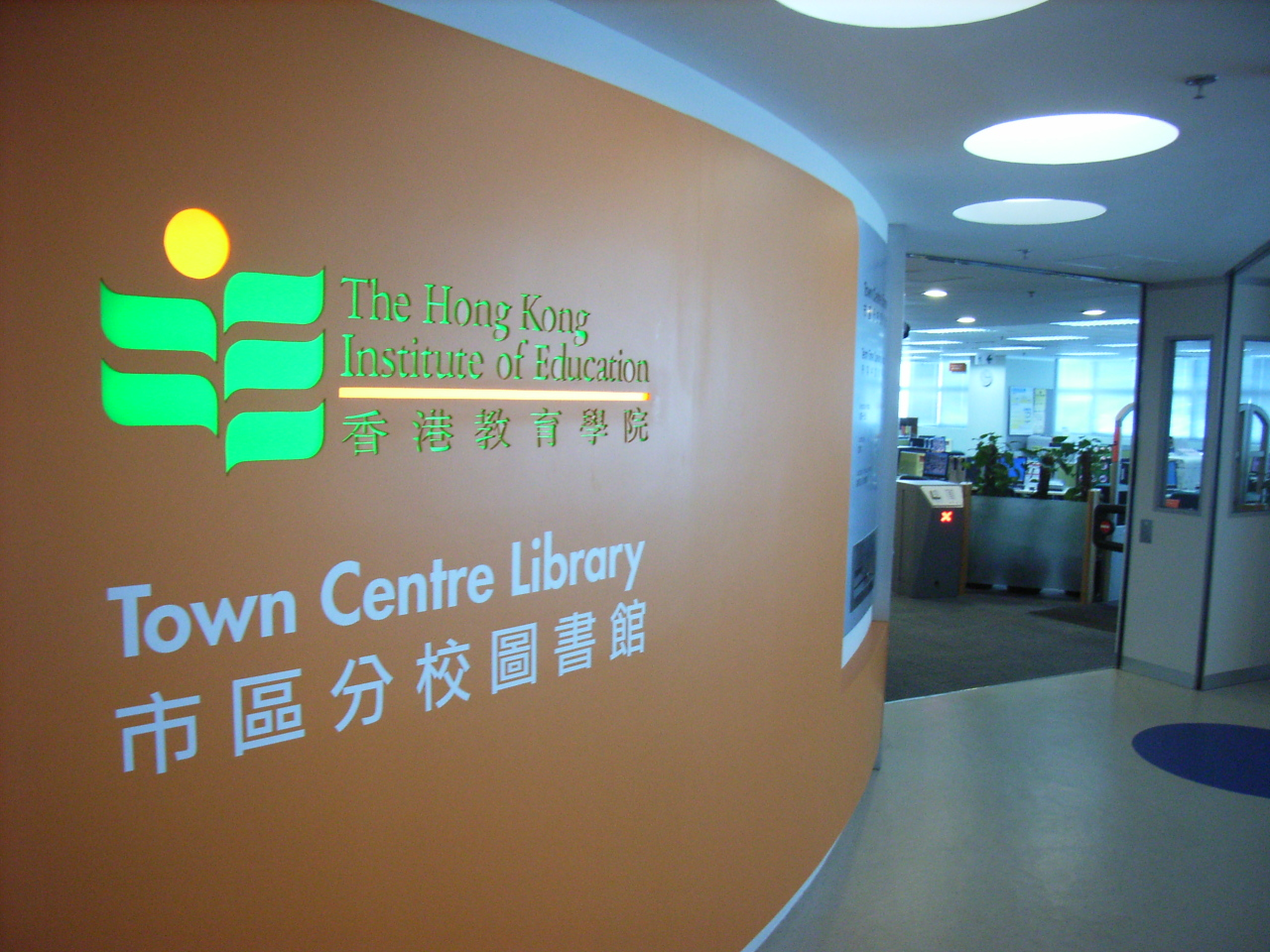
Town Centre of HKIEd

The Long Beach (Chinese: 浪澄灣; Jyutping: long4 cing4 waan1) is a private housing estate in the waterfront of Tai Kok Tsui, Kowloon, Hong Kong. It comprises eight residential towers offering a total of 1,829 units. It was developed by Hang Lung Properties in 2006 and started selling to the public in 2008 and 2009. As of November 2016 one tower is still completely unsold, and the developer keeps releasing small batches of apartments - sold as if they were new - every month or so, to keep the price high. The town centre of the Hong Kong Institute of Education is also located there.

== Education ==
The Long Beach is in Primary One Admission (POA) School Net 32. Within the school net are multiple aided schools (operated independently but funded with government money) and Tong Mei Road Government Primary School (塘尾道官立小學).
