= Long Beach Search and Rescue =

Youth search and rescue unit

- Headquarters: Long Beach, California
- Country: United States
- Founders: Richard Johansen and William Spurrier
- Website http://www.lbsar.org/

Long Beach Search and Rescue is a specialist Explorer post of the Learning for Life program with the Boy Scouts of America. It is an urban search and rescue unit based out of Long Beach, California, and is sponsored by the Long Beach Police Motor Patrol Association and Long Beach Firefighters' Associations.

Long Beach Search and Rescue is designated by the California Governor's Office of Emergency Services as a Type II — Medium rescue resource, the only volunteer unit in the nation to receive this designation, which most professional fire departments do not have.

Long Beach Search and Rescue is on call 24/7 and assists the Long Beach Police and Fire Departments in officer-involved shootings, fires, evidence and missing persons searches, natural disasters, and other incidents.

== History ==
In 1962, the Long Beach Police Department assigned Long Beach Police Motor Patrol Officer Richard Johansen to start Long Beach Search and Rescue as a place for young adults interested in law enforcement. The unit soon grew to become a place for those interested in firefighting and other emergency services as well.

In 1971, Long Beach Search and Rescue was called to assist in rescue and recovery operations at the VA Hospital in Sylmar, California after it collapsed during the Sylmar earthquake.

Originally located in a building at the Long Beach Airport, Long Beach Search and Rescue was permanently moved to its current headquarters on the grounds of the Long Beach Fire Training Center in the mid-1980s.

In 2018, Long Beach Search and Rescue was called to conduct rescue operations in Montecito, California, following severe mudslides.

As of April 16, 2019, members have contributed a total of more than 1 million volunteer hours assisting the fire and police departments and their community. The unit has been on national television, including a close up in the pilot episode of the 1972 hit show, "Emergency!" They have also been featured on the news and in newspapers.

== Training ==
Candidates for the Long Beach Search and Rescue unit are selected by means of written application and interview. The top candidates are then tested on physical fitness, and upon passing both, begin the fourteen-week training academy. Recruits are tested physically and academically each week, and must pass a final exam and skills assessment at the end of the academy to graduate to the unit.

Crew members of Long Beach Search and Rescue train and maintain equipment weekly. Topics of training include rappelling, CPR and First Aid, vehicle extrication, and ground search operations. The members also maintain the base and the unit's nine rescue vehicles. Training also includes courses conducted by FEMA, CERT, and other organizations.
